= Hybrid electric vehicle =

Vehicle that operates on a combination of petrol and electricity

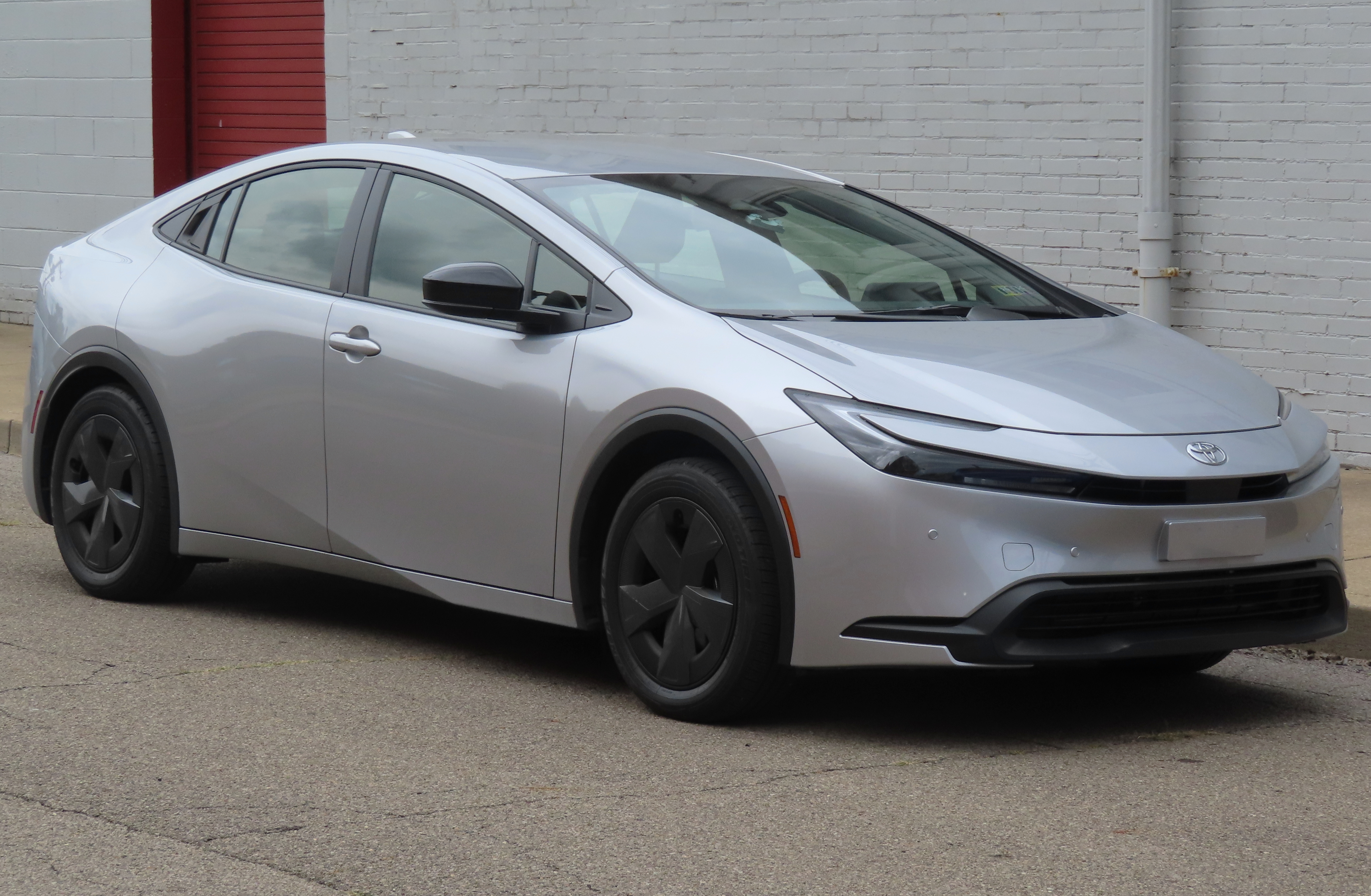
The Toyota Prius is the world's best-selling hybrid car, with cumulative global sales of 5 million units up until September 2022

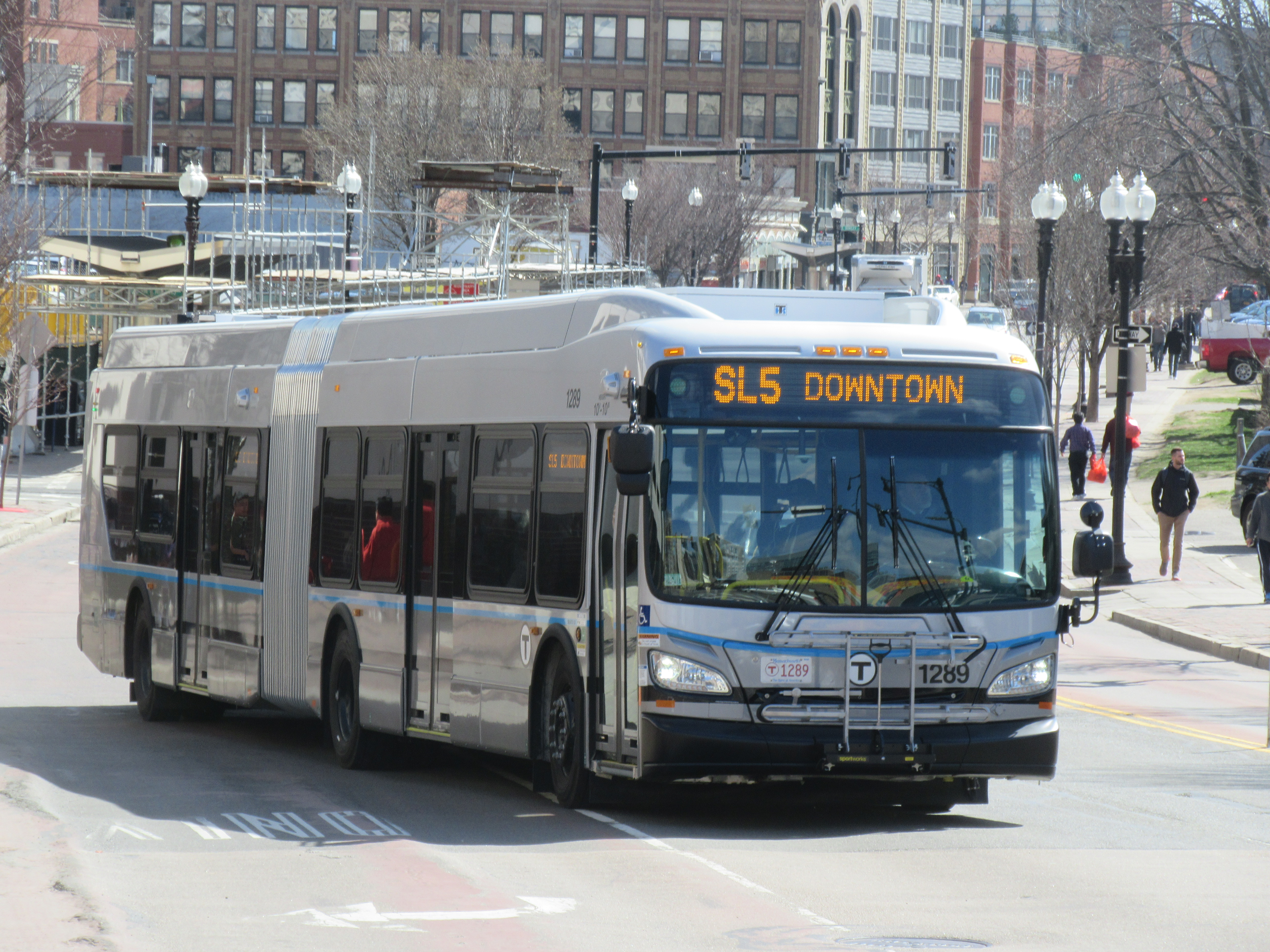
A New Flyer XDE60 Xcelsior articulated hybrid-electric bus operated by MBTA

A hybrid electric vehicle (HEV) is a type of hybrid vehicle that couples a conventional internal combustion engine (ICE) with one or more electric engines into a combined propulsion system. The presence of the electric powertrain, which has inherently better energy conversion efficiency, is intended to achieve either better fuel economy or better acceleration performance than a conventional vehicle. There is a variety of HEV types and the degree to which each functions as an electric vehicle (EV) also varies. The most common form of HEV is hybrid electric passenger cars, although hybrid electric trucks (pickups, tow trucks and tractors), buses, motorboats, and aircraft also exist.

Modern HEVs use energy recovery technologies such as motor–generator units and regenerative braking to recycle the vehicle's kinetic energy to electric energy via an alternator, which is stored in a battery pack or a supercapacitor. Some varieties of HEV use an internal combustion engine to directly drive an electrical generator, which either recharges the vehicle's batteries or directly powers the electric traction motors; this combination is known as a range extender. Many HEVs reduce idle emissions by temporarily shutting down the combustion engine at idle (such as when waiting at the traffic light) and restarting it when needed; this is known as a start-stop system. A hybrid-electric system produces less tailpipe emissions than a comparably sized petrol engine vehicle since the hybrid's petrol engine usually has smaller displacement and thus lower fuel consumption than that of a conventional petrol-powered vehicle. If the engine is not used to drive the car directly, it can be geared to run at maximum efficiency, further improving fuel economy.

Ferdinand Porsche developed the Lohner–Porsche in 1901. But hybrid electric vehicles did not become widely available until the release of the Toyota Prius in Japan in 1997, followed by the Honda Insight in 1999. Initially, hybrid seemed unnecessary due to the low cost of petrol. Worldwide increases in the price of petroleum caused many automakers to release hybrids in the late 2000s; they are now perceived as a core segment of the automotive market of the future.

As of April 2020, over 17 million hybrid electric vehicles have been sold worldwide since their inception in 1997. Japan has the world's largest hybrid electric vehicle fleet with 7.5 million hybrids registered as of March 2018. Japan also has the world's highest hybrid market penetration with hybrids representing 19.0% of all passenger cars on the road as of March 2018, both figures excluding kei cars. As of December 2020, the U.S. ranked second with cumulative sales of 5.8 million units since 1999, and, as of July 2020, Europe listed third with 3.0 million cars delivered since 2000.

Global sales are led by the Toyota Motor Corporation with more than 15 million Lexus and Toyota hybrids sold as of January 2020, followed by Honda Motor Co., Ltd. with cumulative global sales of more than 1.35 million hybrids as of June 2014; As of September 2022, worldwide hybrid sales are led by the Toyota Prius liftback, with cumulative sales of 5 million units. The Prius nameplate had sold more than 6 million hybrids up to January 2017. Global Lexus hybrid sales achieved the 1 million unit milestone in March 2016. As of January 2017, the conventional Prius is the all-time best-selling hybrid car in both Japan and the U.S., with sales of over 1.8 million in Japan and 1.75 million in the U.S.

== Classification ==
=== Types of powertrain ===
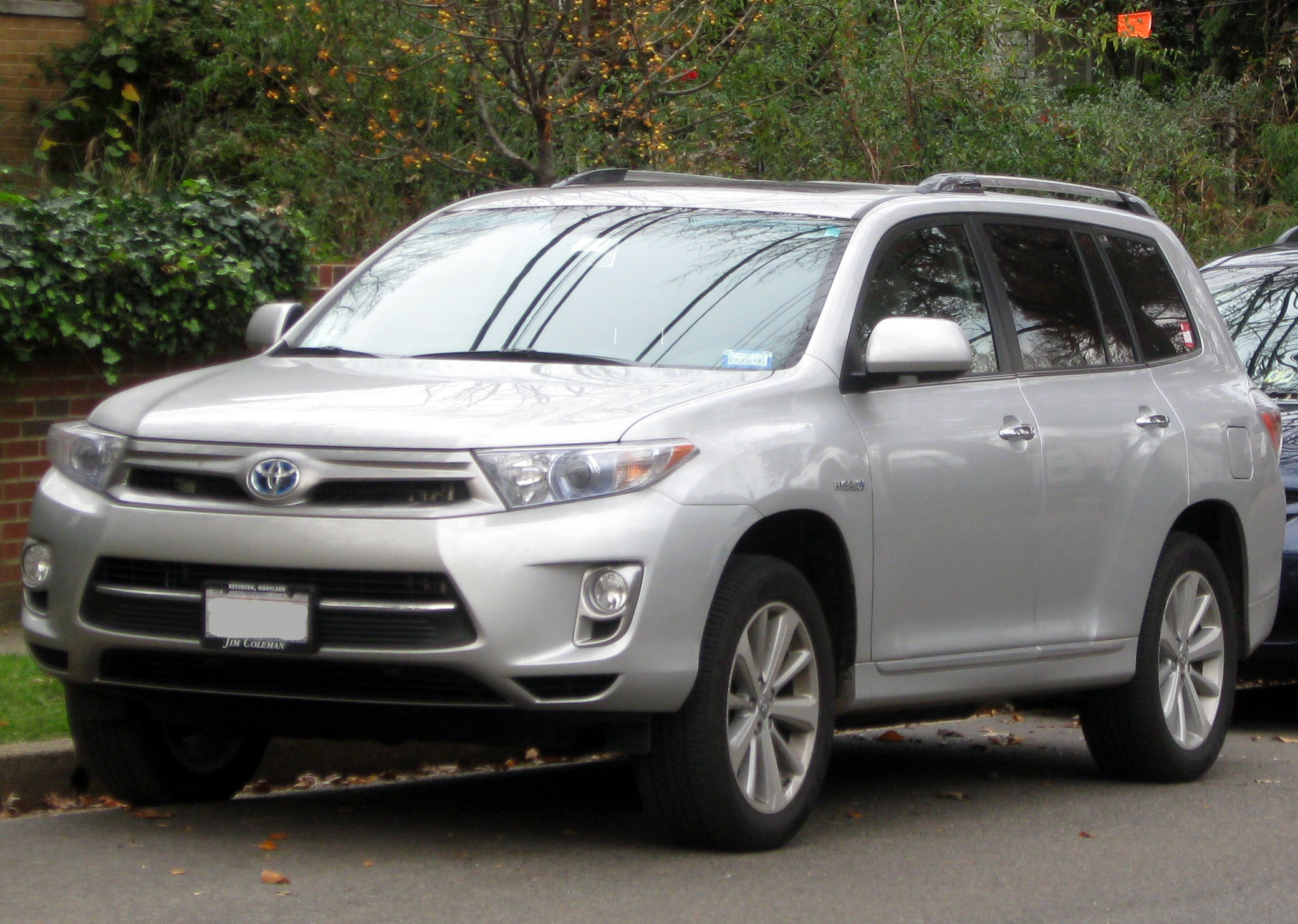
The Toyota Highlander Hybrid has a series-parallel drivetrain.

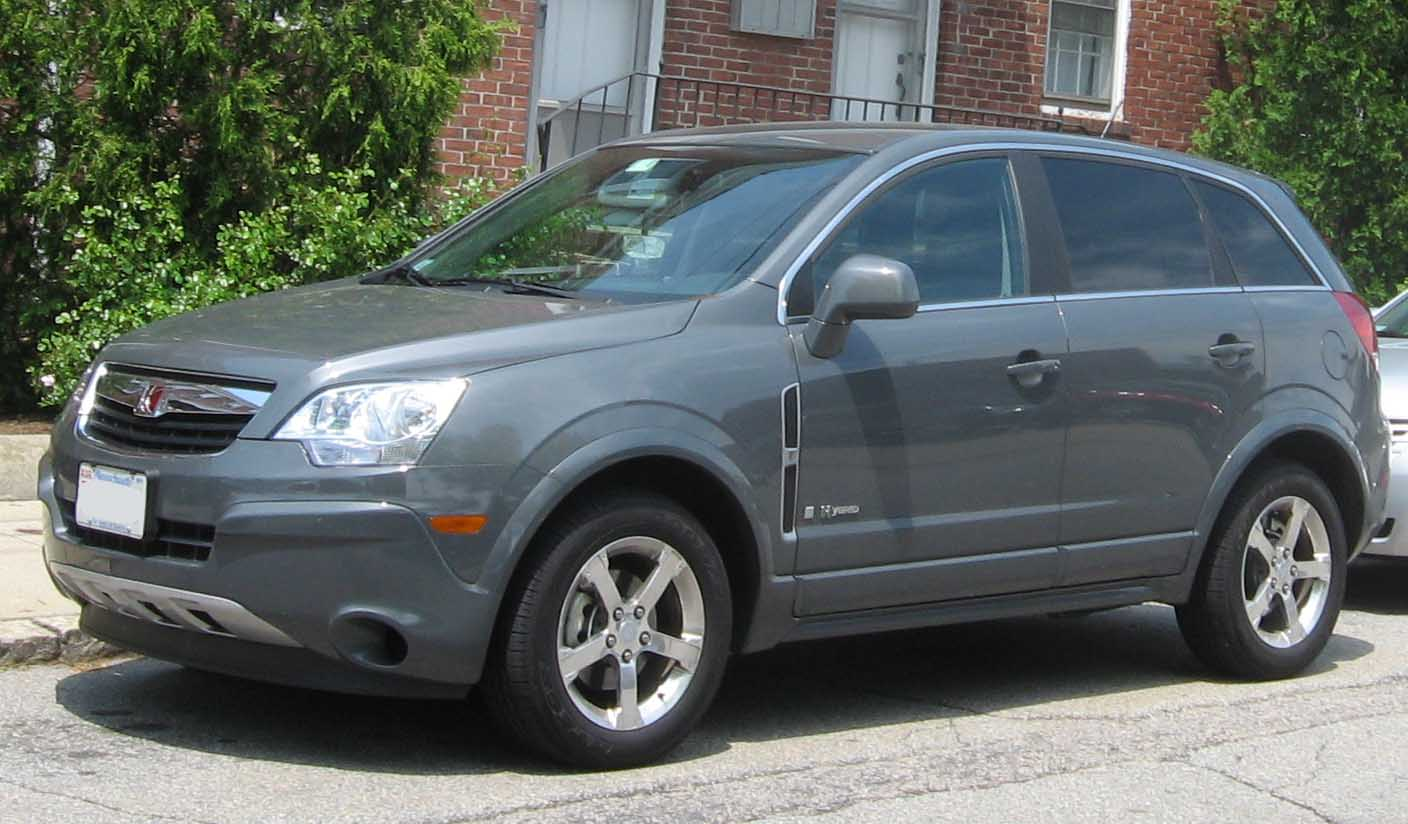
The Saturn Vue Green Line is a mild hybrid.

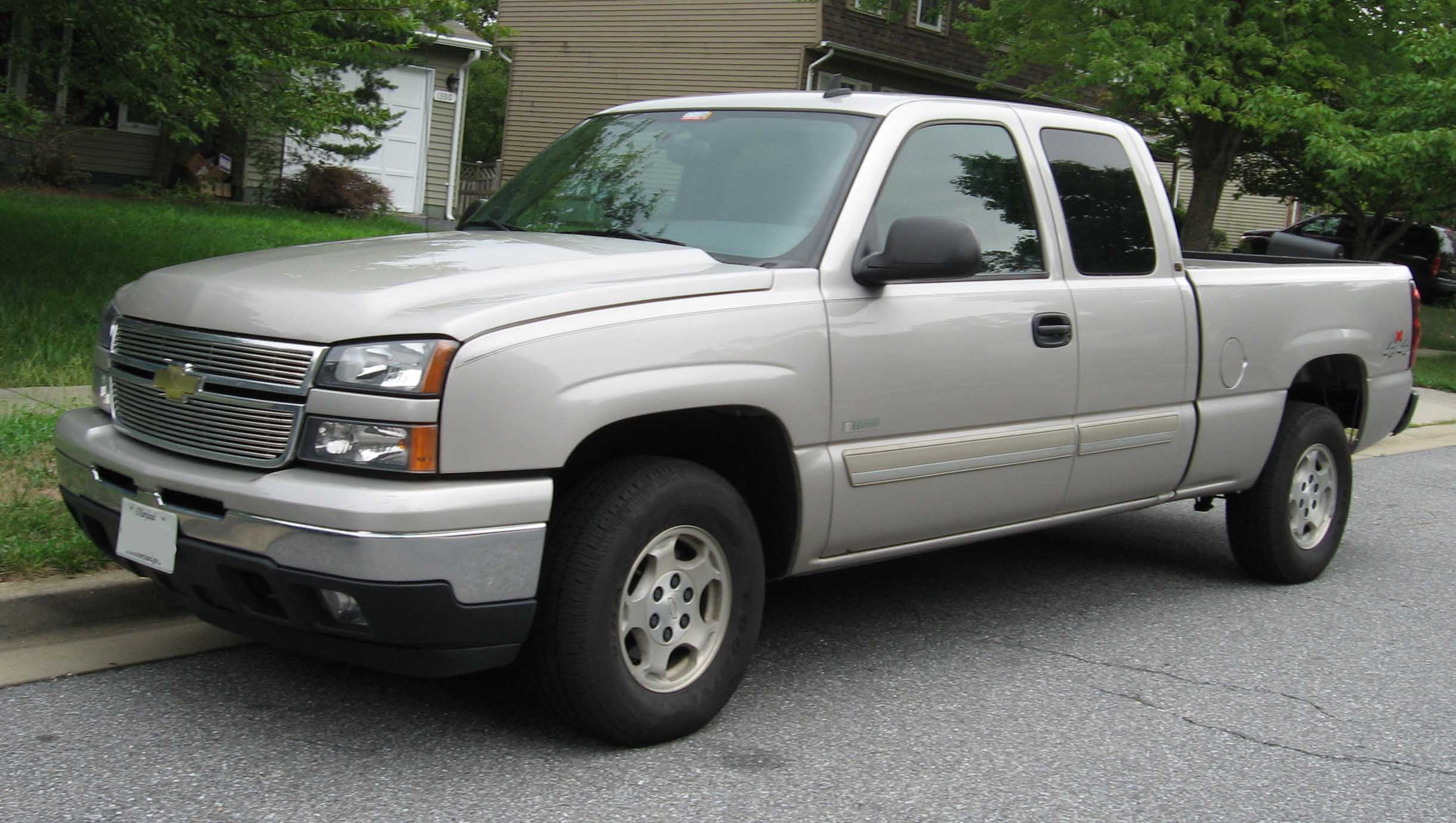
The 2005–06 Chevrolet Silverado Hybrid is a mild hybrid using the electric motor mainly to power the accessories.

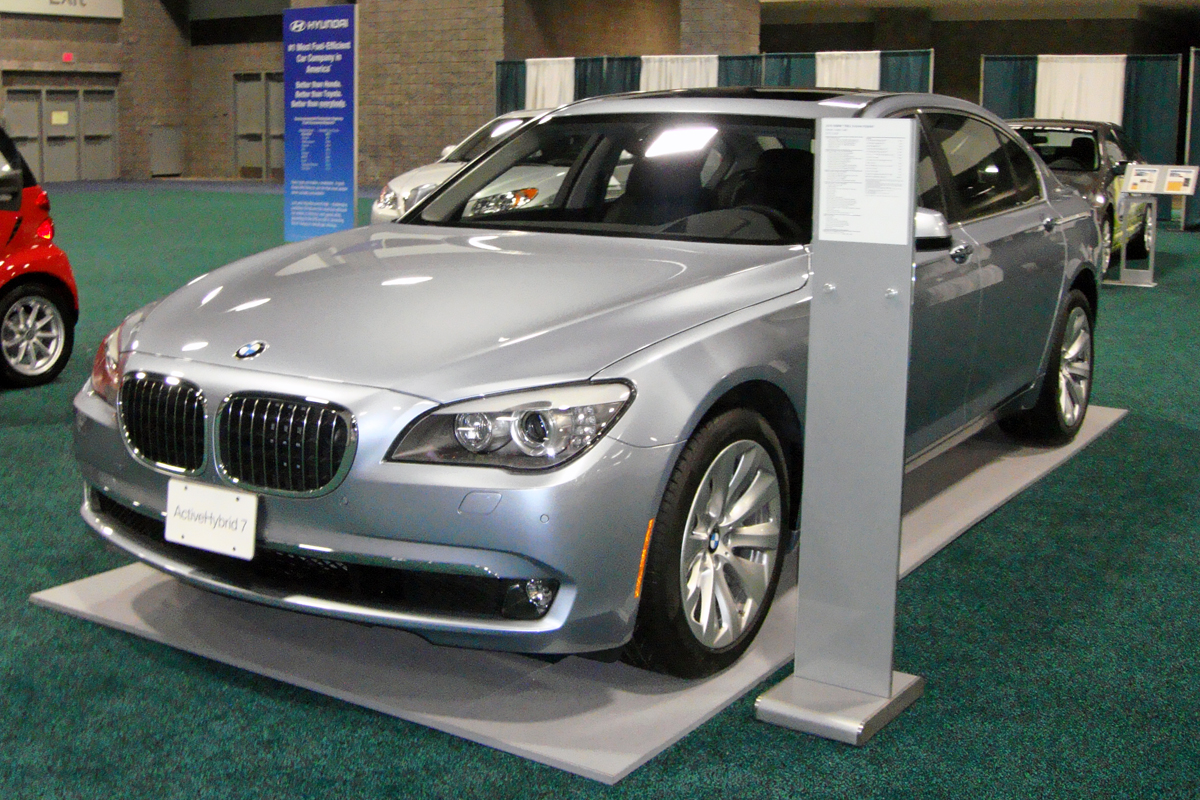
The BMW Concept 7 Series ActiveHybrid is a mild hybrid with an electric motor designed to increase power and performance.

Hybrid electric vehicles can be classified according to the way in which power is supplied to the drivetrain:

- In parallel hybrids, the ICE and the electric motor are both connected to the mechanical transmission and can simultaneously transmit power to drive the wheels, usually through a conventional transmission. Honda's Integrated Motor Assist (IMA) system as found in the Insight, Civic, Accord, as well as the GM Belted Alternator/Starter (BAS Hybrid) system found in the Chevrolet Malibu hybrids are examples of production parallel hybrids. The internal combustion engine of many parallel hybrids can also act as a generator for supplemental recharging. As of 2013, commercialized parallel hybrids use a full size combustion engine with a single, small (<20 kW) electric motor and small battery pack as the electric motor is designed to supplement the main engine, not to be the sole source of motive power from launch. But after 2015 parallel hybrids with over 50 kW are available, enabling electric driving at moderate acceleration. Parallel hybrids are more efficient than comparable non-hybrid vehicles especially during urban stop-and-go conditions where the electric motor is permitted to contribute, and during highway operation.
- In series hybrids, only the electric motor drives the drivetrain, and a smaller ICE (also called range extender) works as a generator to power the electric motor or to recharge the batteries. They also usually have a larger battery pack than parallel hybrids, making them more expensive. Once the batteries are low, the small combustion engine can generate power at its optimum settings at all times, making them more efficient in extensive city driving.
- Power-split hybrids have the benefits of a combination of series and parallel characteristics. As a result, they are more efficient overall, because series hybrids tend to be more efficient at lower speeds and parallel tend to be more efficient at high speeds; however, the cost of power-split hybrid is higher than a pure parallel. Examples of power-split (referred to by some as "series-parallel") hybrid powertrains include 2007 models of Ford, General Motors, Lexus, Nissan, and Toyota.

In each of the hybrids above it is common to use regenerative braking to recharge the batteries.

=== Type of hybridization ===
- Full hybrid, sometimes also called a strong hybrid, is a vehicle that can run entirely on its electric motor for a period of time. Ford's hybrid system, Toyota's Hybrid Synergy Drive, Peugeot-Citroën's HYbrid4 and General Motors/Chrysler's Two-Mode Hybrid technologies are full hybrid systems. The Toyota Prius, Peugeot 508 RXH HYbrid4, Ford Escape Hybrid, and Ford Fusion Hybrid are examples of full hybrids, as these cars can be moved forward on battery power alone. A large, high-capacity battery pack is needed for battery-only operation. These vehicles have a split power path allowing greater flexibility in the drivetrain by interconverting mechanical and electrical power, at some cost in complexity.
- A mild hybrid is a vehicle that cannot be driven solely on its electric motor, because the electric motor does not have enough power to propel the vehicle on its own. Mild hybrids include only some of the features found in hybrid technology, and usually achieve limited fuel consumption savings, up to 15 percent in urban driving and 8 to 10 percent overall cycle. A mild hybrid is essentially a conventional vehicle with an oversized starter motor, allowing the engine to be turned off whenever the car is coasting, braking, or stopped, yet restart quickly and cleanly. The motor is often mounted between the engine and transmission, taking the place of the torque converter, and is used to supply additional propulsion energy when accelerating. Accessories can continue to run on electrical power while the petrol engine is off, and as in other hybrid designs, the motor is used for regenerative braking to recapture energy. As compared to full hybrids, mild hybrids have smaller batteries and a smaller, weaker motor/generator, which allows manufacturers to reduce cost and weight. Honda's early hybrids including the first generation Insight used this design, leveraging their reputation for design of small, efficient petrol engines; their system is dubbed Integrated Motor Assist (IMA). Starting with the 2006 Civic Hybrid, the IMA system now can propel the vehicle solely on electric power during medium speed cruising. Another example is the 2005–2007 Chevrolet Silverado Hybrid, a full-size pickup truck. Chevrolet was able to get a 10% improvement on the Silverado's fuel efficiency by shutting down and restarting the engine on demand and using regenerative braking. General Motors has also used its mild BAS Hybrid technology in other models such as the Saturn Vue Green Line, the Saturn Aura Greenline, the 2008-2009 Chevrolet Malibu Hybrid and the 2013–2014 Chevrolet Malibu Eco.

=== Plug-in hybrids (PHEVs) ===
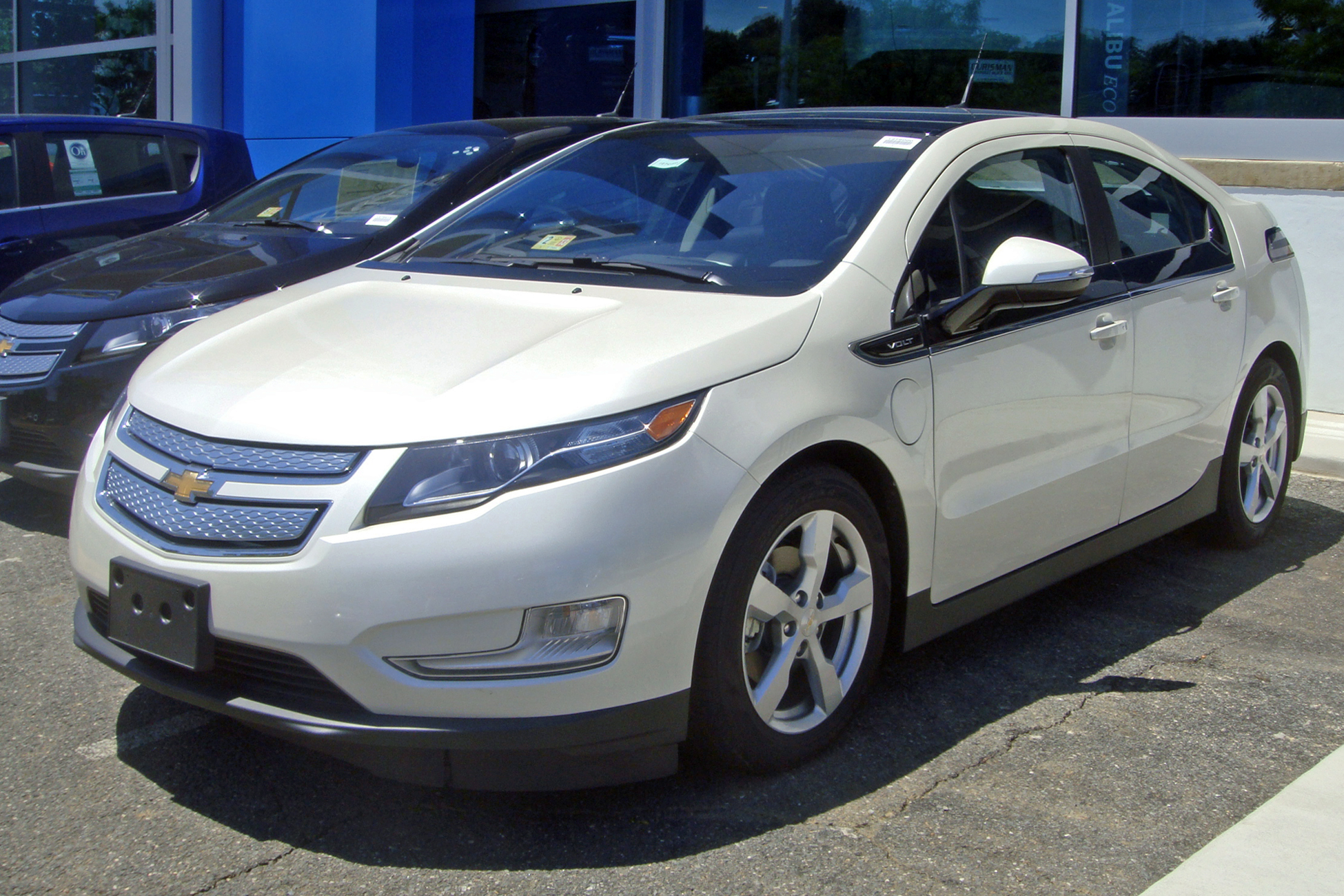
The first generation Chevrolet Volt is a plug-in hybrid able to run in all-electric mode up to 35 mi (56 km).

A plug-in hybrid electric vehicle (PHEV), also known as a plug-in hybrid, is a hybrid electric vehicle with rechargeable batteries that can be restored to full charge by connecting a plug to an external electric power source. A PHEV shares the characteristics of both a conventional hybrid electric vehicle, having an electric motor and an internal combustion engine; and of an all-electric vehicle, also having a plug to connect to the electrical grid. PHEVs have a much larger all-electric range as compared to conventional petrol-electric hybrids, and also eliminate the "range anxiety" associated with all-electric vehicles, because the combustion engine works as a backup when the batteries are depleted.

=== Flex-fuel hybrid ===
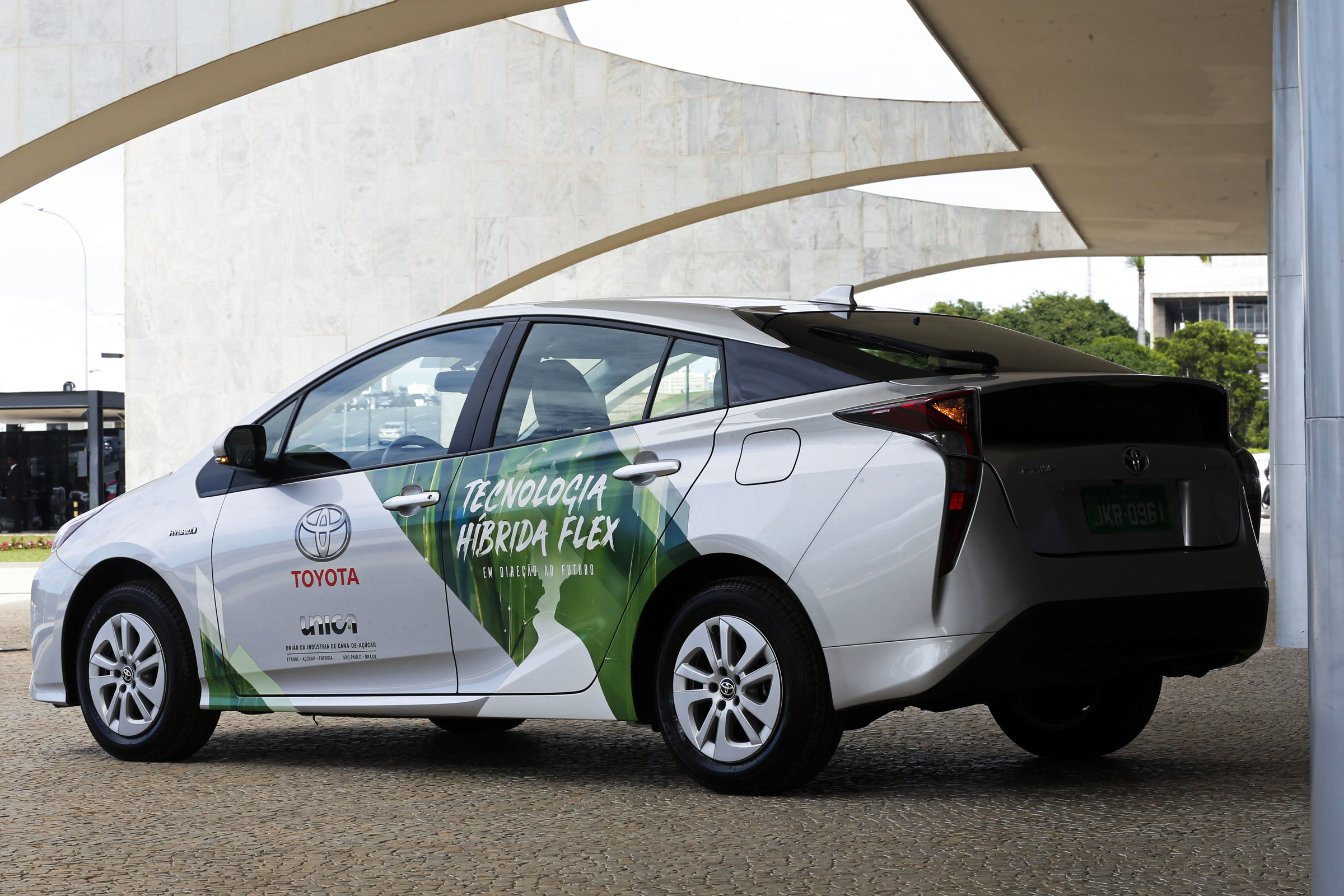
First commercial flex-fuel hybrid electric car tested with a Toyota Prius as development mule

In December 2018, Toyota do Brasil announced the development of the world's first commercial hybrid electric car with flex-fuel engine capable of running with electricity and ethanol fuel or petrol. The flexible fuel hybrid technology was developed in partnership with several Brazilian federal universities, and a prototype was tested for six months using a Toyota Prius as development mule. Toyota announced plans to start series production of a flex hybrid electric car for the Brazilian market in the second half of 2019.

The twelfth generation of the Corolla line-up was launched in Brazil in September 2019, which included an Altis trim with the first version of a flex-fuel hybrid powered by a 1.8-litre Atkinson engine. By February 2020, sales of the Corolla Altis flex-fuel hybrid represented almost 25% of all Corolla sales in the country.

=== Energy Management Systems ===
To take advantage of the emission reduction potential of hybrid electric vehicles (HEVs), appropriate design of their energy management systems (EMSs) to control the power flow between the engine and the battery is essential.

In a conventional (non-hybrid) vehicle, there is no need for an energy management strategy: the driver decides the instant power delivery using the brake and accelerator pedals and, in manual transmission vehicles, decides which gear is engaged at any time. In a hybrid vehicle, on the other hand, there is an additional decision that must be taken due to its ability to recover energy during braking or driving downhill: how much power is delivered by each of the energy sources on board the vehicle. The recovered energy can be stored in the battery and deployed at a later time to assist the prime mover to provide tractive power. This is why all hybrid vehicles include an energy management controller, interposed between the driver and the component controllers. As mentioned, the aim of the energy management system is to determine the optimal power split between the on-board energy sources. The decision regarding what to consider optimal depends on the specific application: in most cases, the strategies tend to minimize the fuel consumption, but optimization objectives could also include the minimization of pollutant emissions, maximization of battery life or—in general—a compromise among all the above goals.

== History ==
=== Early days ===
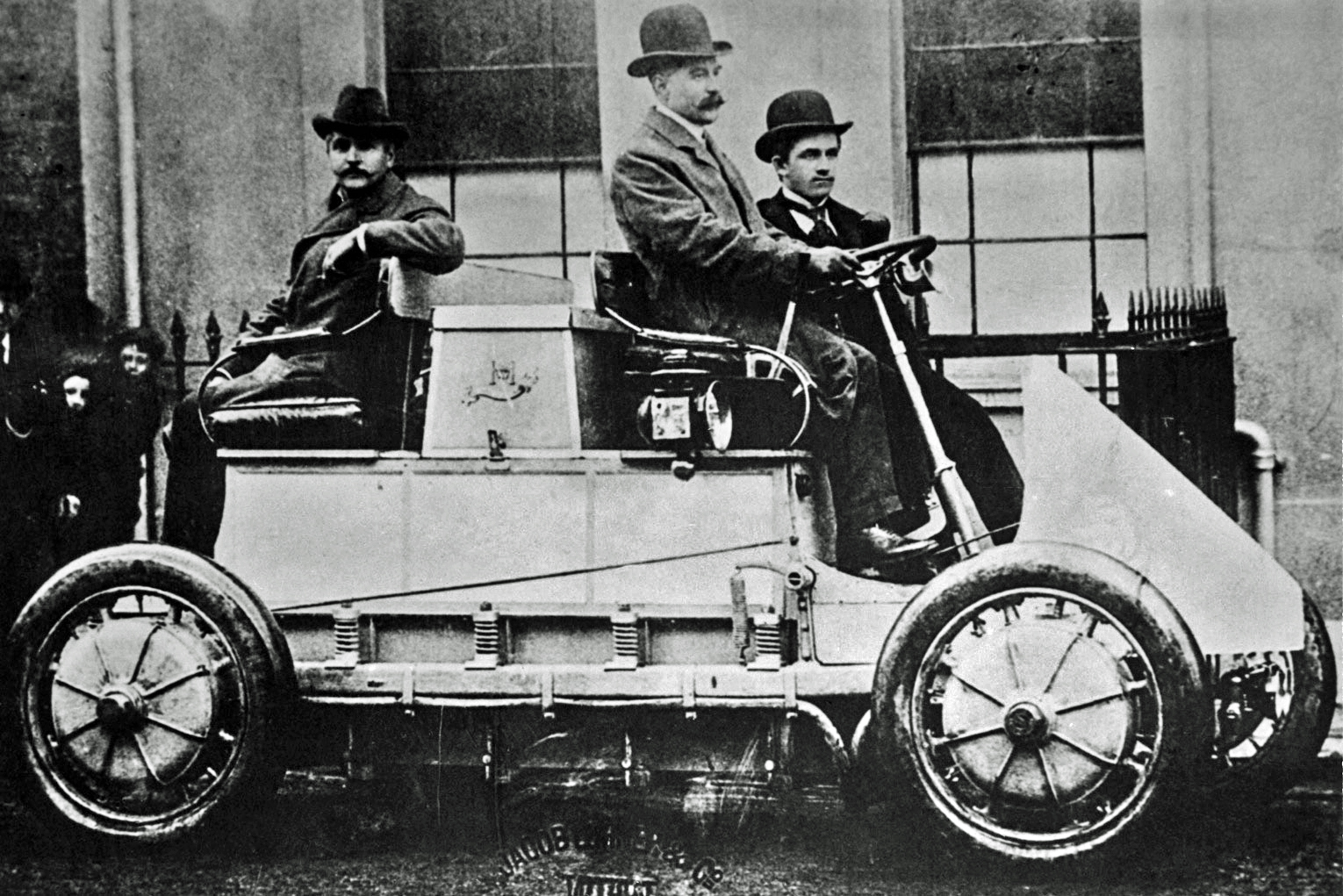
The Lohner–Porsche Mixte Hybrid was the first petrol-electric hybrid automobile.

William H. Patton filed a patent application for a petrol-electric hybrid rail-car propulsion system in early 1889, and for a similar hybrid boat propulsion system in mid-1889. He went on to test and market the Patton Motor Car, a gas-electric hybrid system used to drive tram cars and small locomotives. A petrol engine drove a generator that served to charge a lead acid battery in parallel with the traction motors. A conventional series-parallel controller was used for the traction motors. A prototype was built in 1889, an experimental tram car was run in Pullman, Illinois, in 1891, and a production locomotive was sold to a street railway company in Cedar Falls, Iowa, in 1897.

In 1896, the Armstrong Phaeton was developed by Harry E. Dey and built by the Armstrong Company of Bridgeport, CT for the Roger Mechanical Carriage Company. Though there were steam, electric, and internal combustion vehicles introduced in the early days, the Armstrong Phaeton was innovative with many firsts. Not only did it have a petrol powered 6.5-litre, two-cylinder engine, but also a dynamo flywheel connected to an onboard battery. The dynamo and regenerative braking were used to charge the battery. Its electric starter was used 16 years before Cadillac's. The dynamo also provided ignition spark and powered the electric lamps. The Phaeton also had the first semi-automatic transmission (no manual clutch). The exhaust system was an integrated structural component of the vehicle. The Armstrong Phaeton's motor was too powerful; the torque damaged the carriage wheels repeatedly.

In 1900, while employed at Lohner Coach Factory, Ferdinand Porsche developed the Mixte, a 4WD series-hybrid version of "System Lohner–Porsche" electric carriage that previously appeared at the 1900 Paris World Fair. George Fischer sold hybrid buses to England in 1901; Knight Neftal produced a racing hybrid in 1902.

Figure 1 of Henri Pieper's 1905 Hybrid Vehicle Patent Application

In 1905, Henri Pieper of Germany/Belgium introduced a hybrid vehicle with an electric motor/generator, batteries, and a small petrol engine. It used the electric motor to charge its batteries at cruise speed and used both motors to accelerate or climb a hill. The Pieper factory was taken over by Impéria, after Pieper died. The 1915 Dual Power, made by the Woods Motor Vehicle electric car maker, had a four-cylinder ICE and an electric motor. Below 15 mph (24 km/h) the electric motor alone drove the vehicle, drawing power from a battery pack, and above this speed the "main" engine cut in to take the car up to its 35 mph (56 km/h) top speed. About 600 were made up to 1918. The Woods hybrid was a commercial failure, proving to be too slow for its price, and too difficult to service. In England, the prototype Lanchester petrol-electric car was made in 1927. It was not a success, but the vehicle is on display in Thinktank, Birmingham Science Museum. The United States Army's 1928 Experimental Motorized Force tested a petrol-electric bus in a truck convoy.

In 1931, Erich Gaichen invented and drove from Altenburg to Berlin a 1/2 horsepower electric car containing features later incorporated into hybrid cars. Its maximum speed was 25 miles per hour (40 km/h), but it was licensed by the Motor Transport Office, taxed by the German Revenue Department and patented by the German Reichs-Patent Amt. The car battery was re-charged by the motor when the car went downhill. Additional power to charge the battery was provided by a cylinder of compressed air which was re-charged by small air pumps activated by vibrations of the chassis and the brakes and by igniting oxyhydrogen gas. No production beyond the prototype was reported.

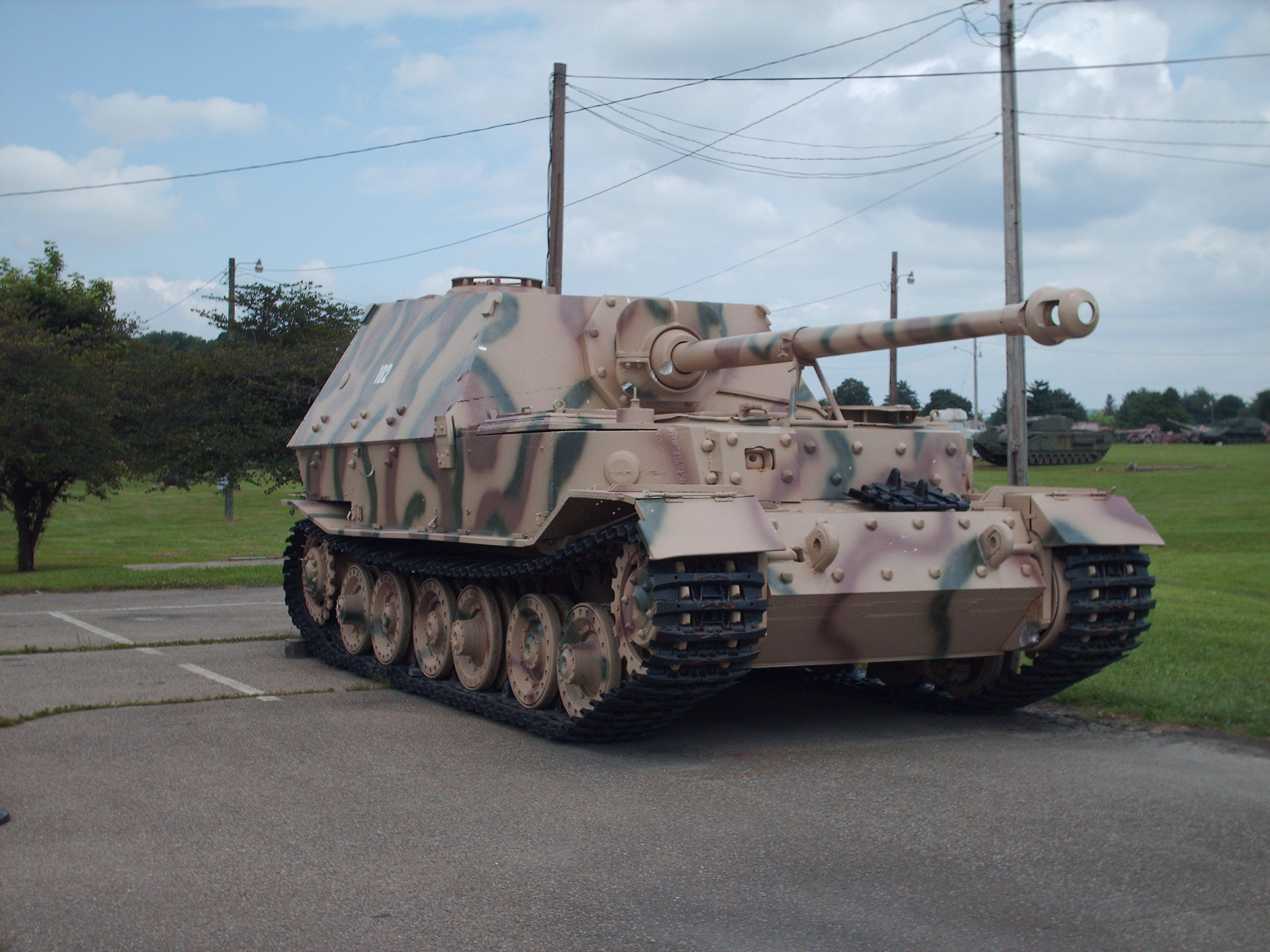
Porsche's Elefant tank destroyer, restored for museum display

During the Second World War, Ferdinand Porsche sought to use his firm's experience in hybrid drivetrain design for powering armoured fighting vehicles for Nazi Germany. A series of designs, starting with the VK 3001 (P), the unsuccessful VK 4501 (P) heavy tank prototype (which became the Elefant tank destroyer) and concluding with the heaviest armoured fighting vehicle ever prototyped, the Panzerkampfwagen Maus of nearly 190 tonnes in weight, were just two examples of a number of planned Wehrmacht "weapons systems" (including the highly-"electrified" subsystems on the Fw 191 bomber project), crippled in their development by the then-substandard supplies of electrical-grade copper, required for the electric final drives on Porsche's armoured fighting vehicle powertrain designs.

=== Predecessors of present technology ===
The regenerative braking system, a core design concept of most modern production HEVs, was developed in 1967 for the American Motors Amitron and called Energy Regeneration Brake by AMC. This completely battery powered urban concept car was recharged by braking, thus increasing the range of the automobile. The AMC Amitron was first use of regenerative braking technology in the U.S.

A more recent working prototype of the HEV was built by Victor Wouk (one of the scientists involved with the Henney Kilowatt, the first transistor-based electric car) and Dr. Charles L Rosen. Wouk's work with HEVs in the 1960s and 1970s earned him the title as the "Godfather of the Hybrid". They installed a prototype hybrid drivetrain (with a 16-kilowatt (21 hp) electric motor) into a 1972 Buick Skylark provided by GM for the 1970 Federal Clean Car Incentive Program, but the program was stopped by the United States Environmental Protection Agency (EPA) in 1976 while Eric Stork, the head of the EPA's vehicle emissions control program at the time, was accused of a prejudicial coverup.

In 1979 the Fiat 131 Ibrido was presented in Detroit, a marching prototype made by the CRF (Fiat Research Center). The engine compartment was composed by the 903cc borrowed from the Fiat 127, set to output 33 hp only and coupled to a 20 kW electric motor. The scheme proposed by Fiat is defined as "parallel hybrid": the petrol engine is connected to the differential with a 1:1 direct gear ratio, without gearbox, instead of the clutch there was an 8-inch torque converter followed by the transmission shaft on which the rotor of the electric motor is keyed, the latter powered by a 12-batteries pack.

The regenerative brake concept was further developed in the early 1980s by David Arthurs, an electrical engineer, using off-the shelf components, military surplus, and an Opel GT. The voltage controller to link the batteries, motor (a jet-engine starter motor), and DC generator was Arthurs'. The vehicle exhibited 75 miles per US gallon (3.1 L/100 km; 90 mpg_{‑imp}) fuel efficiency, and plans for it were marketed by Mother Earth News.

In 1982, Fritz Karl Preikschat invented an electric propulsion and braking system for cars based on regenerative braking. While clearly not the only patent relating to the hybrid electric vehicle, the patent was important based on 120+ subsequent patents directly citing it. The patent was issued in the U.S. and the system was not prototyped or commercialized.

In 1988, Alfa Romeo built three prototypes of the Alfa 33 Hybrid, equipped with the tried and tested Alfasud boxer engine (1,500cc, 95 HP) combined with a three-phase asynchronous electric motor (16 HP, 6.1 kgm of torque) supplied by Ansaldo of Genoa. The design was realistic and already mass production-oriented, with minimal modifications to the standard body and a weight increase of only 150 kg (110 for the batteries, 20 for the electric engine and 10 for power electronics). The Alfa Romeo 33 Ibrida was able to travel up to 60 km/h in full electric mode, with a 5 km range, very good performance for the time.

In 1989, Audi produced its first iteration of the Audi Duo (the Audi C3 100 Avant Duo) experimental vehicle, a plug-in parallel hybrid based on the Audi 100 Avant quattro. This car had a 9.4 kilowatts (12.8 PS; 12.6 bhp) Siemens electric motor which drove the rear roadwheels. A trunk-mounted nickel–cadmium battery supplied energy to the motor that drove the rear wheels. The vehicle's front road wheels were powered by a 2.3-litre five-cylinder petrol engine with an output of 100 kilowatts (136 PS; 134 bhp). The intent was to produce a vehicle which could operate on the engine in the country, and electric mode in the city. Mode of operation could be selected by the driver. Just ten vehicles are believed to have been made; one drawback was that due to the extra weight of the electric drive, the vehicles were less efficient when running on their engines alone than standard Audi 100s with the same engine.

Two years later, Audi, unveiled the second duo generation, the Audi 100 Duo – likewise based on the Audi 100 Avant quattro. Once again, this featured an electric motor, a 21.3 kilowatts (29.0 PS; 28.6 bhp) three-phase machine, driving the rear roadwheels. This time, however, the rear wheels were additionally powered via the Torsen centre differential from the main engine compartment, which housed a 2.0-litre four-cylinder engine.

Research and Development was advancing in the 1990s with projects such as the early BMW 5 Series (E34) CVT hybrid-electric vehicle In 1992, Volvo ECC was developed by Volvo. The Volvo ECC was built on the Volvo 850 platform. In contrast to most production hybrids, which use a petrol piston engine to provide additional acceleration and to recharge the battery storage, the Volvo ECC used a gas turbine engine to drive the generator for recharging.

The Clinton administration initiated the Partnership for a New Generation of Vehicles (PNGV) program on 29 September 1993, that involved Chrysler, Ford, General Motors, USCAR, the DoE, and other various governmental agencies to engineer the next efficient and clean vehicle. The United States National Research Council (USNRC) cited automakers' moves to produce HEVs as evidence that technologies developed under PNGV were being rapidly adopted on production lines, as called for under Goal 2. Based on information received from automakers, NRC reviewers questioned whether the "Big Three" would be able to move from the concept phase to cost effective, pre-production prototype vehicles by 2004, as set out in Goal 3. The program was replaced by the hydrogen-focused FreedomCAR initiative by the George W. Bush administration in 2001, an initiative to fund research too risky for the private sector to engage in, with the long-term goal of developing effectively carbon emission- and petroleum-free vehicles.

1998 saw the Esparante GTR-Q9 became the first Petrol-Electric Hybrid to race at Le Mans, although the car failed to qualify for the main event. The car managed to finished second in class at Petit Le Mans the same year.

=== Modern hybrids ===
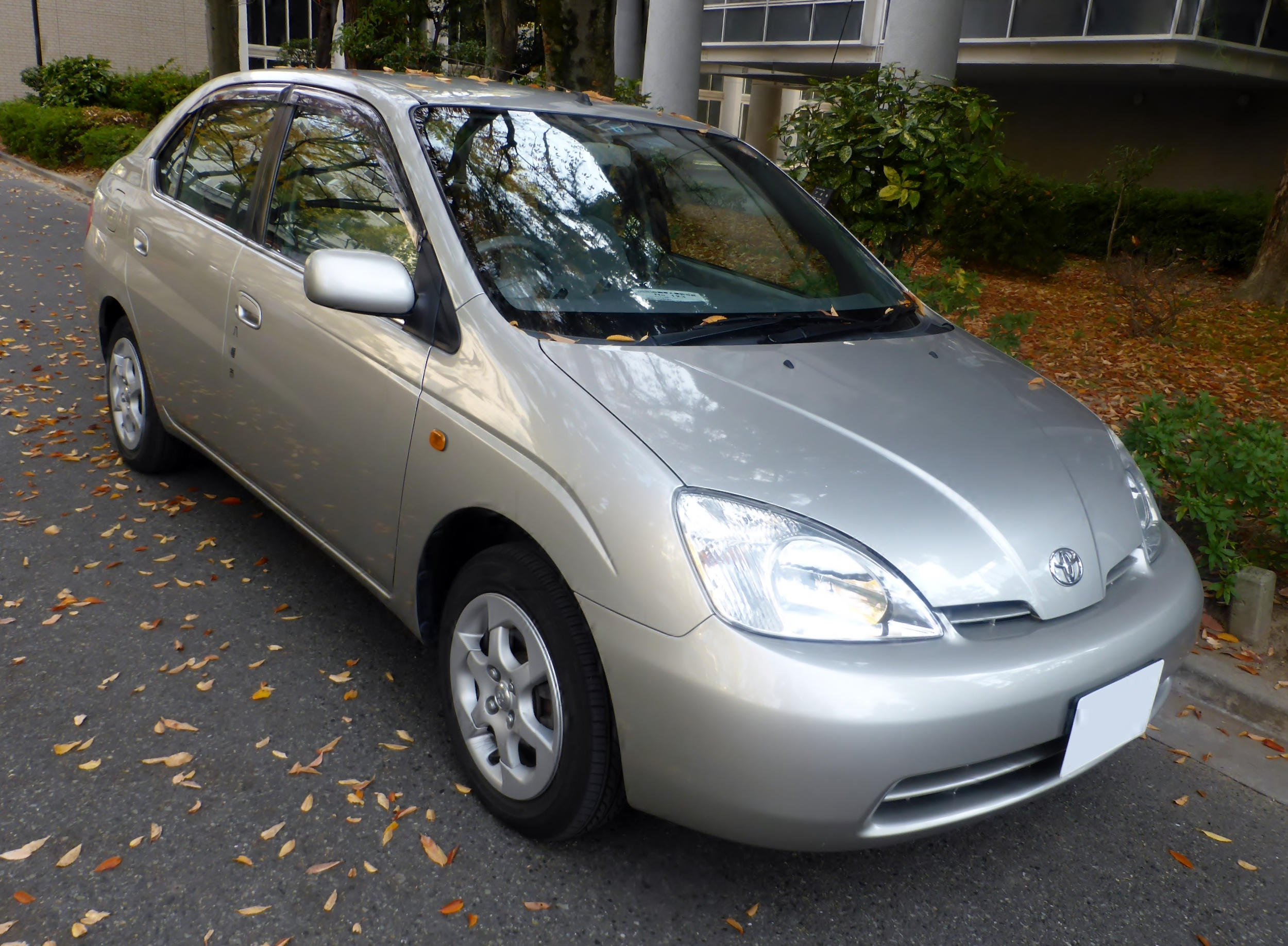
Toyota Prius (first generation)

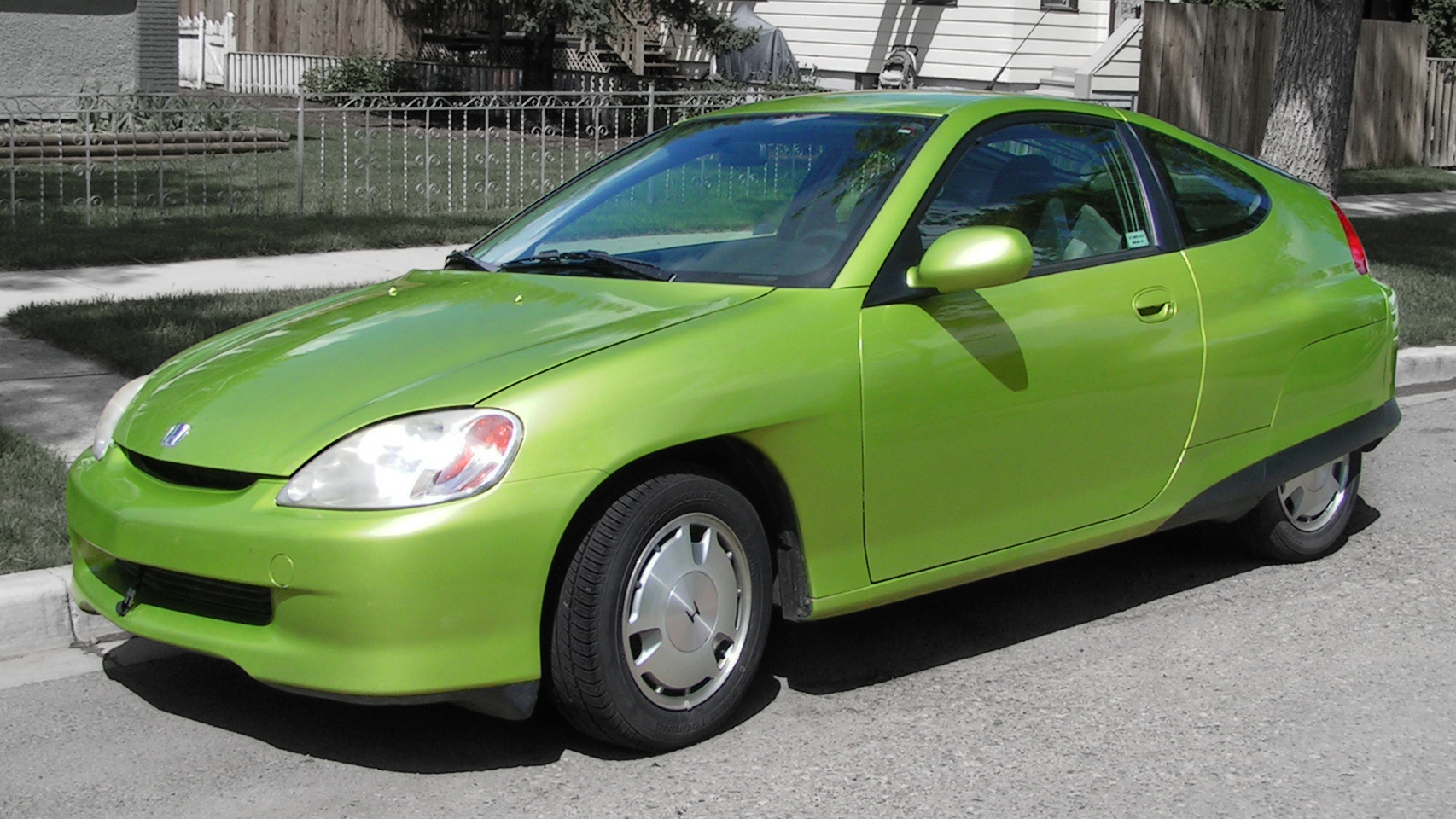
2000 Honda Insight (first generation)

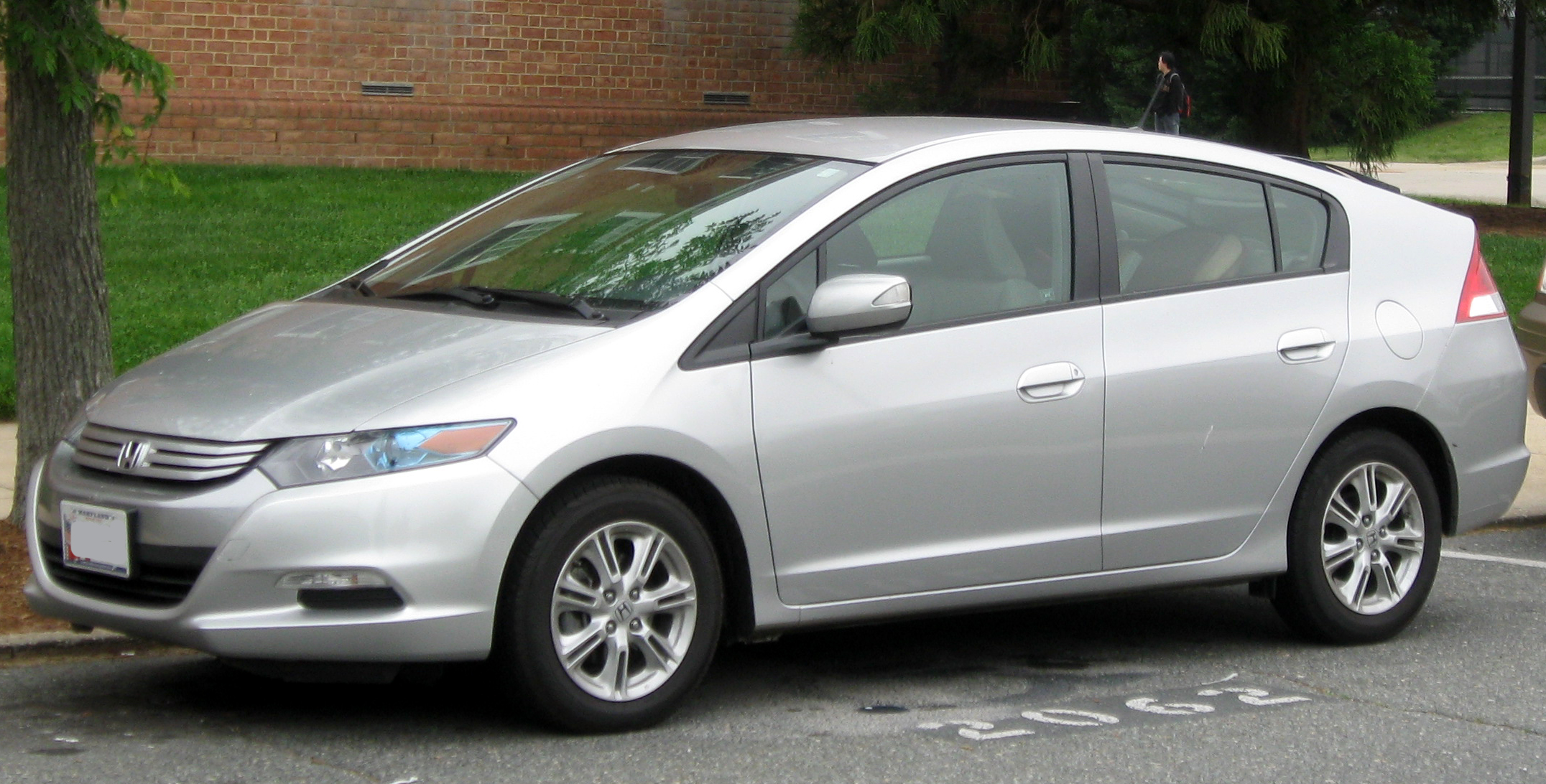
2010 Honda Insight (second generation)

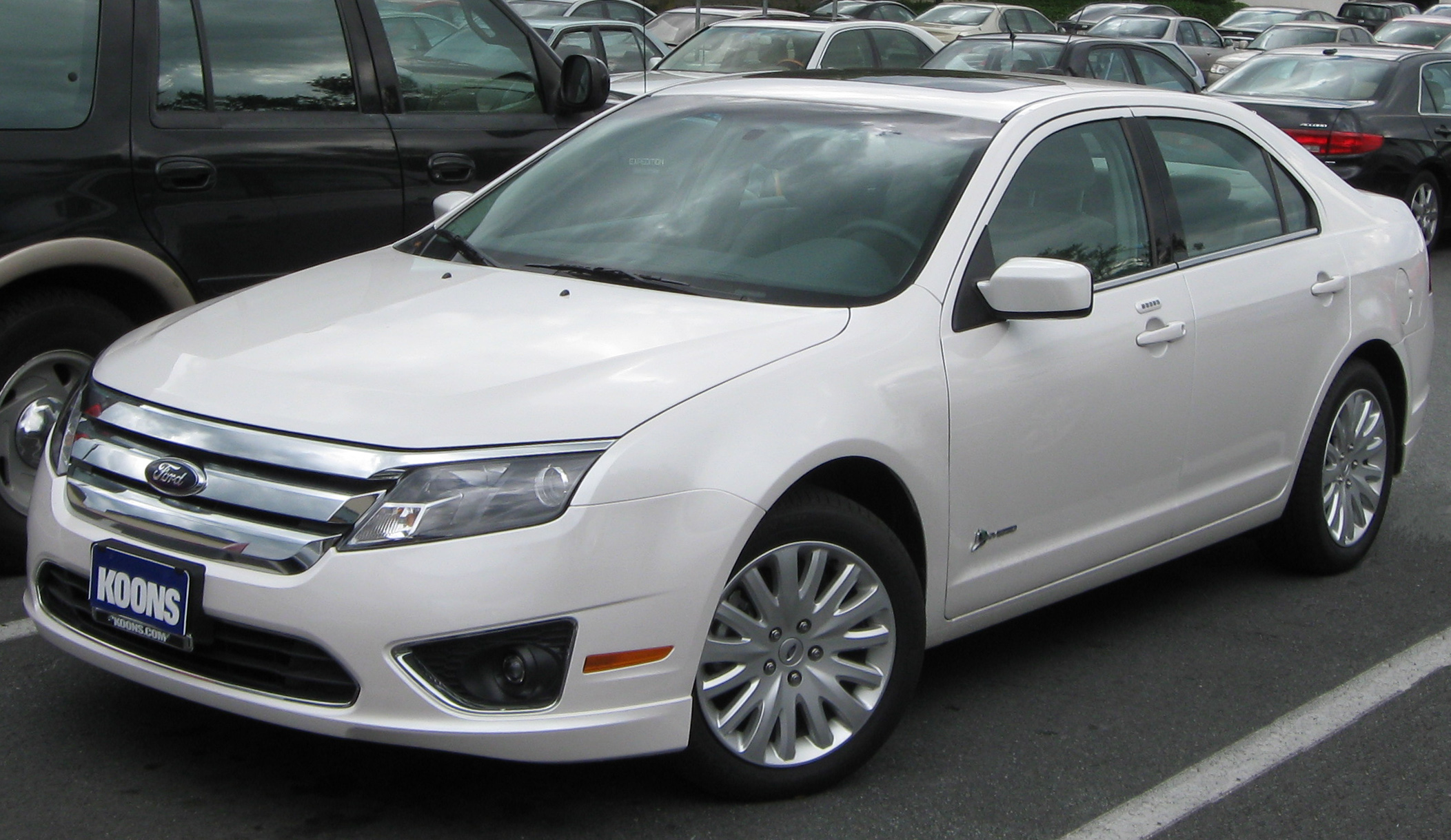
The 2010 Ford Fusion Hybrid was launched in the U.S. in March 2009.

Automotive hybrid technology became widespread beginning in the late 1990s. The first mass-produced hybrid vehicle was the Toyota Prius, launched in Japan in 1997, and followed by the Honda Insight, launched in 1999 in the United States and Japan. The Prius was launched in Europe, North America and the rest of the world in 2000. The first-generation Prius sedan has an estimated fuel economy of 52 miles per US gallon (4.5 L/100 km; 62 mpg_{‑imp}) in the city and 45 miles per US gallon (5.2 L/100 km; 54 mpg_{‑imp}) in highway driving. The two-door first-generation Insight was estimated at 61 miles per US gallon (3.9 L/100 km; 73 mpg_{‑imp}) in city driving and 68 miles per US gallon (3.5 L/100 km; 82 mpg_{‑imp}) on the highway.

The Toyota Prius sold 300 units in 1997 and 19,500 in 2000, and cumulative worldwide Prius sales reached the one million mark in April 2008. By early 2010, the Prius global cumulative sales were estimated at 1.6 million units. Toyota launched a second-generation Prius in 2004 and a third in 2009. The 2010 Prius has an estimated U.S. Environmental Protection Agency combined fuel economy cycle of 50 miles per US gallon (4.7 L/100 km; 60 mpg_{‑imp}).

The Audi Duo III was introduced in 1997, based on the Audi B5 A4 Avant, and was the only Duo to ever make it into series production. The Duo III used the 1.9-litre Turbocharged Direct Injection (TDI) diesel engine, which was coupled with a 21 kilowatts (29 PS; 28 bhp) electric motor. Due to low demand for it because of its high price, only about sixty Audi Duos were produced. Until the release of the Audi Q7 Hybrid in 2008, the Duo was the only European hybrid ever put into production.

The Honda Civic Hybrid was introduced in February 2002 as a 2003 model, based on the seventh-generation Civic. The 2003 Civic Hybrid appears identical to the non-hybrid version, but delivers 50 miles per US gallon (4.7 L/100 km; 60 mpg_{‑imp}), a 40 percent increase compared to a conventional Civic LX sedan. Along with the conventional Civic, it received a styling update for 2004. The redesigned 2004 Toyota Prius (second generation) improved passenger room, cargo area, and power output, while increasing energy efficiency and reducing emissions. The Honda Insight first generation stopped being produced after 2006 and has a devoted base of owners. A second-generation Insight was launched in 2010. In 2004, Honda also released a 6-cylinder hybrid version of the Accord but discontinued it in 2007, citing disappointing sales, although production of a 4-cylinder hybrid began in 2012.

The Ford Escape Hybrid, the first hybrid electric sport utility vehicle (SUV), was released in 2005. Toyota and Ford entered into a licensing agreement in March 2004 allowing Ford to use 20 patents from Toyota related to hybrid technology, although Ford's engine was independently designed and built. In exchange for the hybrid licenses, Ford licensed patents involving their European diesel engines to Toyota. Toyota announced calendar year 2005 hybrid electric versions of the Toyota Highlander Hybrid and Lexus RX 400h with 4WD-i, which uses a rear electric motor to power the rear wheels, negating the need for a transfer case.

In 2006, General Motors Saturn Division began to market a mild parallel hybrid, the 2007 Saturn Vue Green Line, which utilized GM's Belted Alternator/Starter (BAS Hybrid) system combined with a 2.4-litre L4 engine and an FWD automatic transmission. The same hybrid powertrain was also used to power the 2008 Saturn Aura Green Line and Malibu Hybrid models. As of December 2009, only the BAS-equipped Malibu is still in (limited) production.

In 2007, Lexus released a hybrid electric version of their GS sport sedan, the GS 450h, with a power output of 335 bhp. The 2007 Camry Hybrid became available in summer 2006 in the United States and Canada. Nissan launched the Altima Hybrid with technology licensed by Toyota in 2007.

Commencing in fall 2007, General Motors began to market their 2008 Two-Mode Hybrid models of their GMT900-based Chevrolet Tahoe and GMC Yukon SUVs, closely followed by the 2009 Cadillac Escalade Hybrid version. For the 2009 model year, General Motors released the same technology in their half-ton pickup truck models, the 2009 Chevrolet Silverado and GMC Sierra Two-Mode Hybrid models.

The Ford Fusion Hybrid officially debuted at the Greater Los Angeles Auto Show in November 2008, and was launched to the U.S. market in March 2009, together with the second-generation Honda Insight and the Mercury Milan Hybrid.

=== Latest developments ===
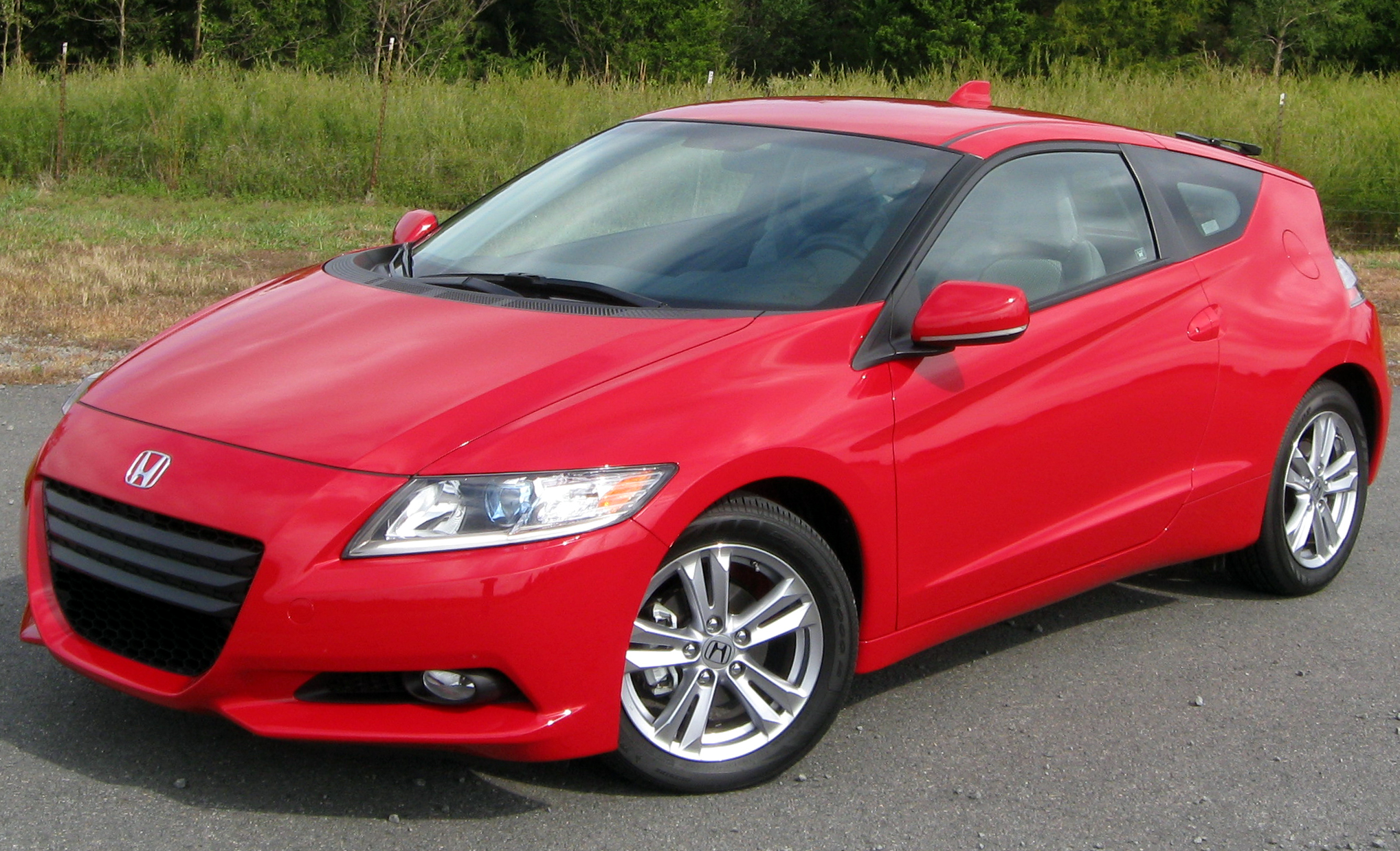
The Honda CR-Z hybrid was launched in Japan in February 2010, followed by the US in August 2010.

==== 2009–2010 ====
The Hyundai Elantra LPI Hybrid was unveiled at the 2009 Seoul Motor Show, and sales began in the South Korean domestic market in July 2009. The Elantra LPI (Liquefied Petroleum Injected) is the world's first hybrid vehicle to be powered by an internal combustion engine built to run on liquefied petroleum gas (LPG) as a fuel. It is a mild hybrid, and the first hybrid to adopt advanced lithium polymer (Li–Poly) batteries.

The Mercedes-Benz S400 BlueHybrid was unveiled in the 2009 Chicago Auto Show, and sales began in the U.S. in October 2009. The S400 BlueHybrid is a mild hybrid and the first hybrid car to adopt a lithium-ion battery. The hybrid technology in the S400 was co-developed by Daimler AG and BMW.

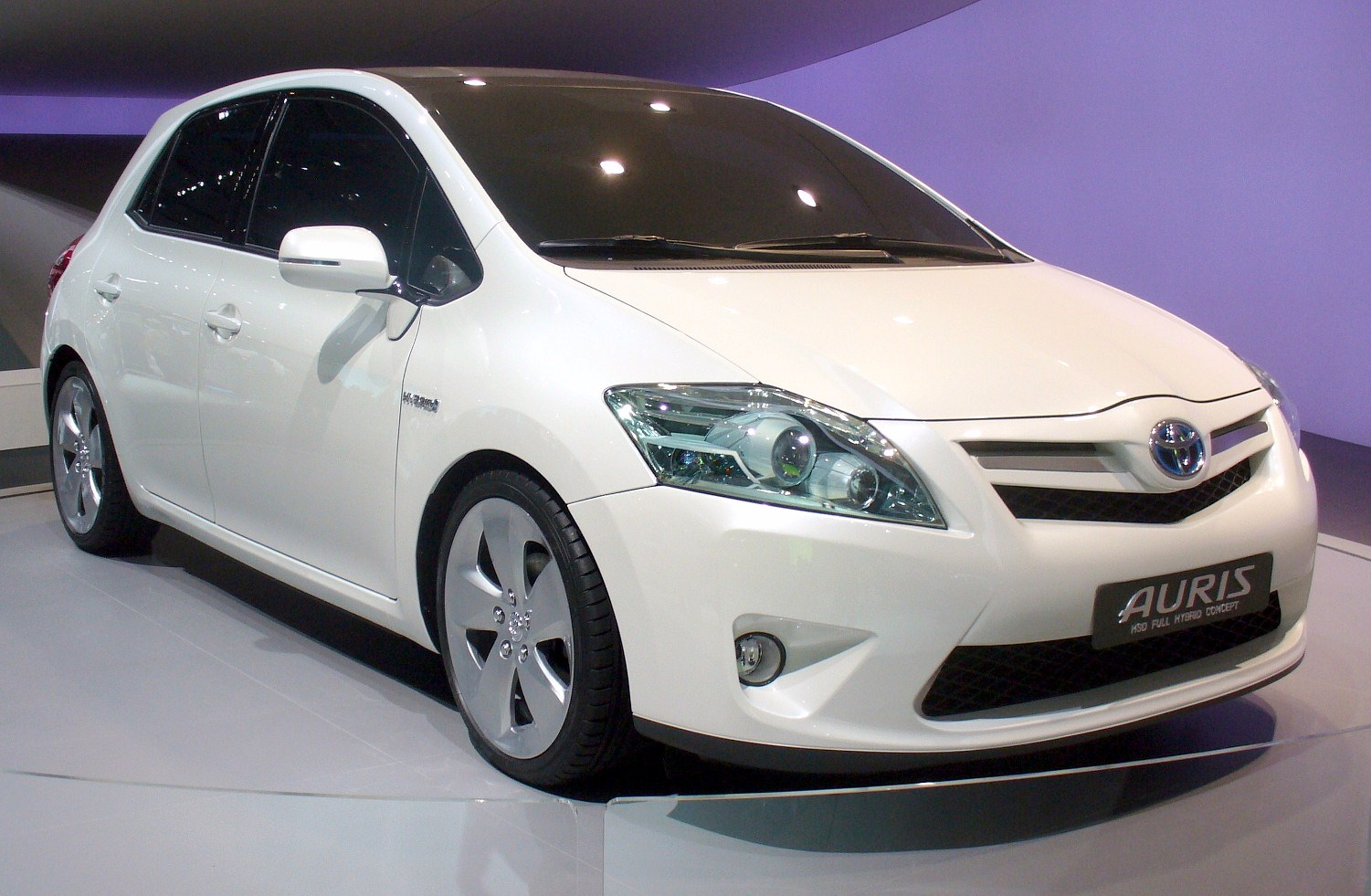
The 2011 Toyota Auris Hybrid is the first mass-produced hybrid electric vehicle built in Europe.

Sales of the Honda CR-Z began in Japan in February 2010, followed by the U.S. and European markets later in the year, becoming Honda's third hybrid electric car in the market. Honda also launched the 2011 Honda Fit Hybrid in Japan in October 2010, and unveiled the European version, theJazz Hybrid, at the 2010 Paris Motor Show, which went on sale in some European markets by early 2011.

Mass production of the 2011 Toyota Auris Hybrid began in May 2010 at Toyota Manufacturing UK (TMUK) Burnaston plant and became the first mass-produced hybrid vehicle to be built in Europe.

The 2011 Lincoln MKZ Hybrid was unveiled at the 2010 New York International Auto Show and sales began in the U.S. in September 2010. The MKZ Hybrid is the first hybrid version ever to have the same price as the petrol-engine version of the same car. The Porsche Cayenne Hybrid was launched in the U.S. in late 2010.

==== 2011–2015 ====
Volkswagen announced at the 2010 Geneva Motor Show the launch of the 2012 Touareg Hybrid, which went on sale on the U.S. in 2011. VW also announced plans to introduce diesel-electric hybrid versions of its most popular models in 2012, beginning with the new Jetta, followed by the Golf Hybrid in 2013 together with hybrid versions of the Passat. Other petrol-electric hybrids released in the U.S. in 2011 were the Lexus CT 200h, the Infiniti M35 Hybrid, the Hyundai Sonata Hybrid and its sibling the Kia Optima Hybrid.

The Peugeot 3008 HYbrid4 was launched in the European market in 2012, becoming the world's first production diesel-electric hybrid.

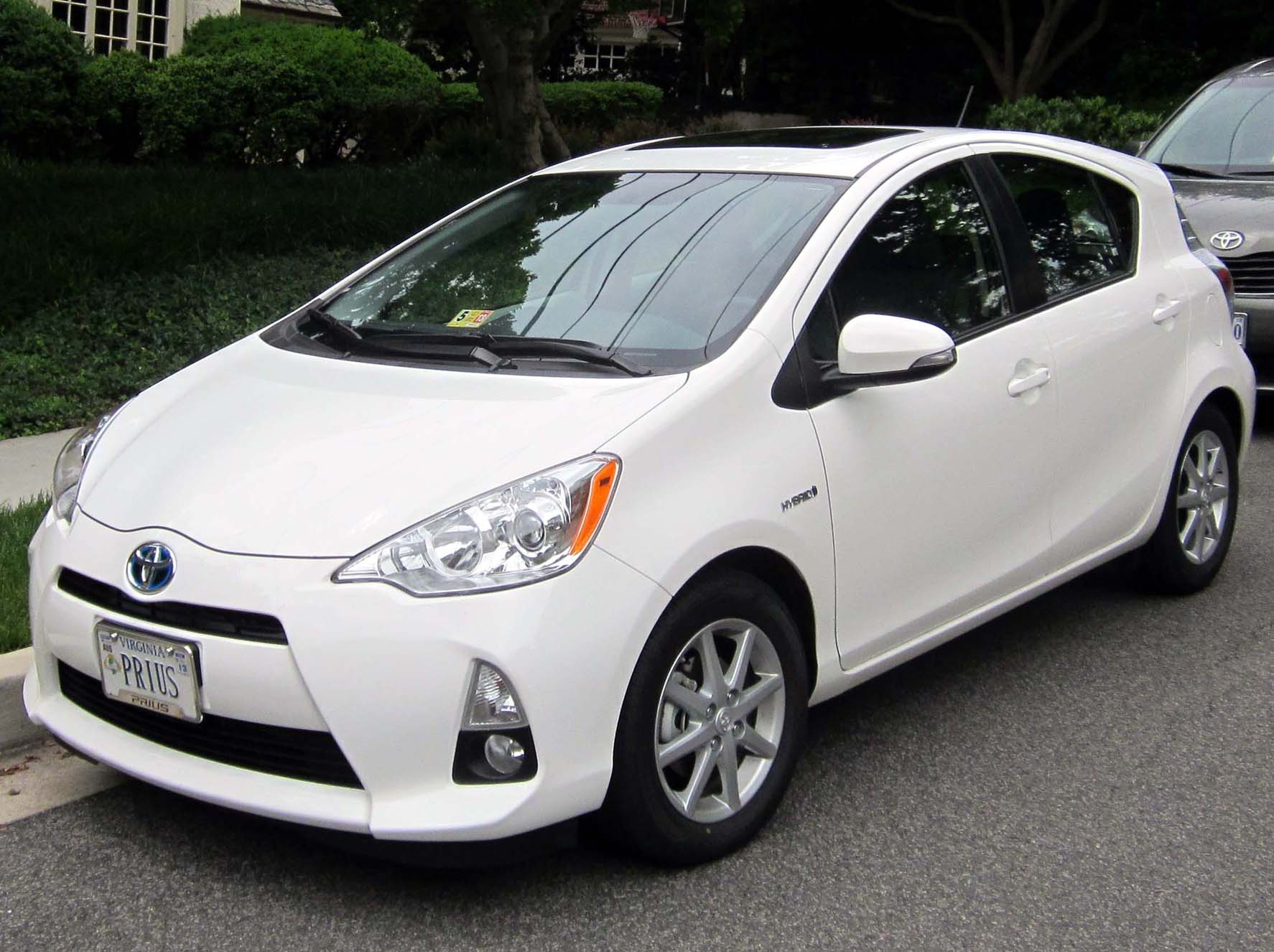
The Toyota Prius c was released in the U.S. in March 2012, and was launched in Japan as Toyota Aqua in December 2011.

The Toyota Prius v, launched in the U.S. in October 2011, is the first spinoff from the Prius family. Sales in Japan began in May 2011 as the Prius Alpha. The European version, named Prius +, was launched in June 2012. The Prius Aqua was launched in Japan in December 2011, and was released as the Toyota Prius c in the U.S. in March 2012. The Prius c was launched in Australia in April 2012. The production version of the 2012 Toyota Yaris Hybrid went on sale in Europe in June 2012.

Other hybrids released in the U.S. during 2012 are the Audi Q5 Hybrid, BMW 5 Series ActiveHybrid, BMW 3 series Hybrid, Ford C-Max Hybrid, Acura ILX Hybrid. Also during 2012 were released the next generation of Toyota Camry Hybrid and the Ford Fusion Hybrid, both of which offer significantly improved fuel economy in comparison with their previous generations. The 2013 models of the Toyota Avalon Hybrid and the Volkswagen Jetta Hybrid were released in the U.S. in December 2012.

Global sales of the Toyota Prius liftback passed the 3 million milestone in June 2013. It was available in almost 80 countries and regions, and it is the world's best-selling hybrid electric vehicle. The redesigned and more efficient fourth generation Prius was released for retail customers in Japan in December 2015. The 2016 model year Prius Eco surpassed the 2000 first generation Honda Insight as the all-time EPA-rated most fuel efficient petrol-powered car available in the U.S. without plug-in capability.

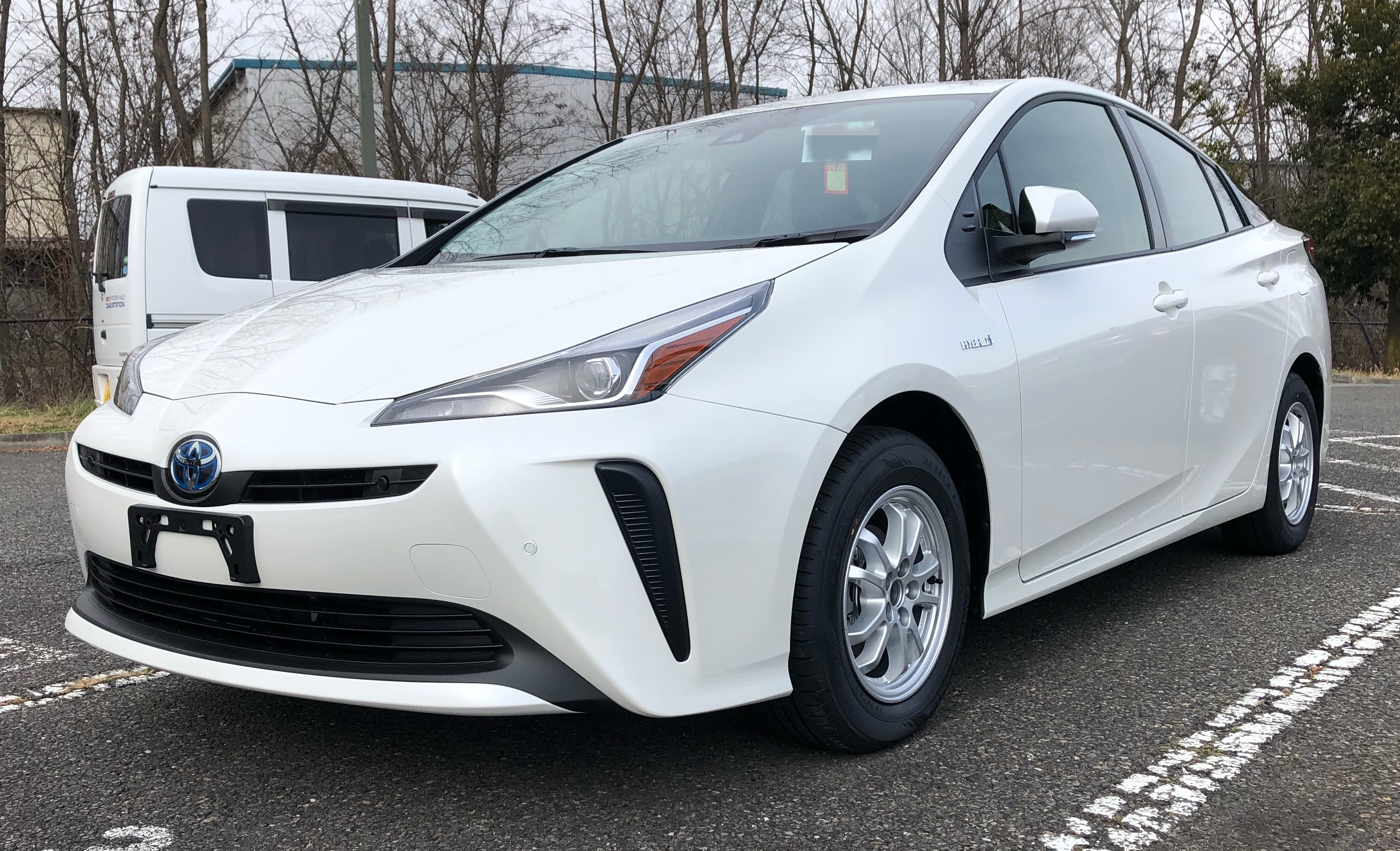
The fourth generation Prius was released in Japan in December 2015.

The Range Rover Hybrid diesel-powered electric hybrid was unveiled at the 2013 Frankfurt Motor Show, with retail deliveries in Europe commencing early 2014. Ford Motor Company, the world's second largest manufacturer of hybrids after Toyota Motor Corporation, reached the milestone of 400,000 hybrid electric vehicles produced in November 2014. After 18 years since the introduction of hybrid cars, Japan became in 2014 the first country to reach sales of over 1 million hybrid cars in a single year, and also the Japanese market surpassed the United States as the world's largest hybrid market.

==== 2018–2024 ====
Honda introduced the e:HEV branding for its hybrid technology in October 2019, consolidating the previously named i-MMD two-motor series-parallel hybrid system under a single identity. The rebrand was said to reflect Honda's commitment to full hybrids as its primary electrification strategy for non-plug-in markets.

In 2019, Toyota launched the Corolla flex-fuel hybrid at its Sorocaba plant in Brazil. It is the world's first production hybrid vehicle capable of running on 100% sugarcane ethanol, combining its fifth-generation hybrid system with an engine compatible with Brazil's widespread ethanol fuel infrastructure.

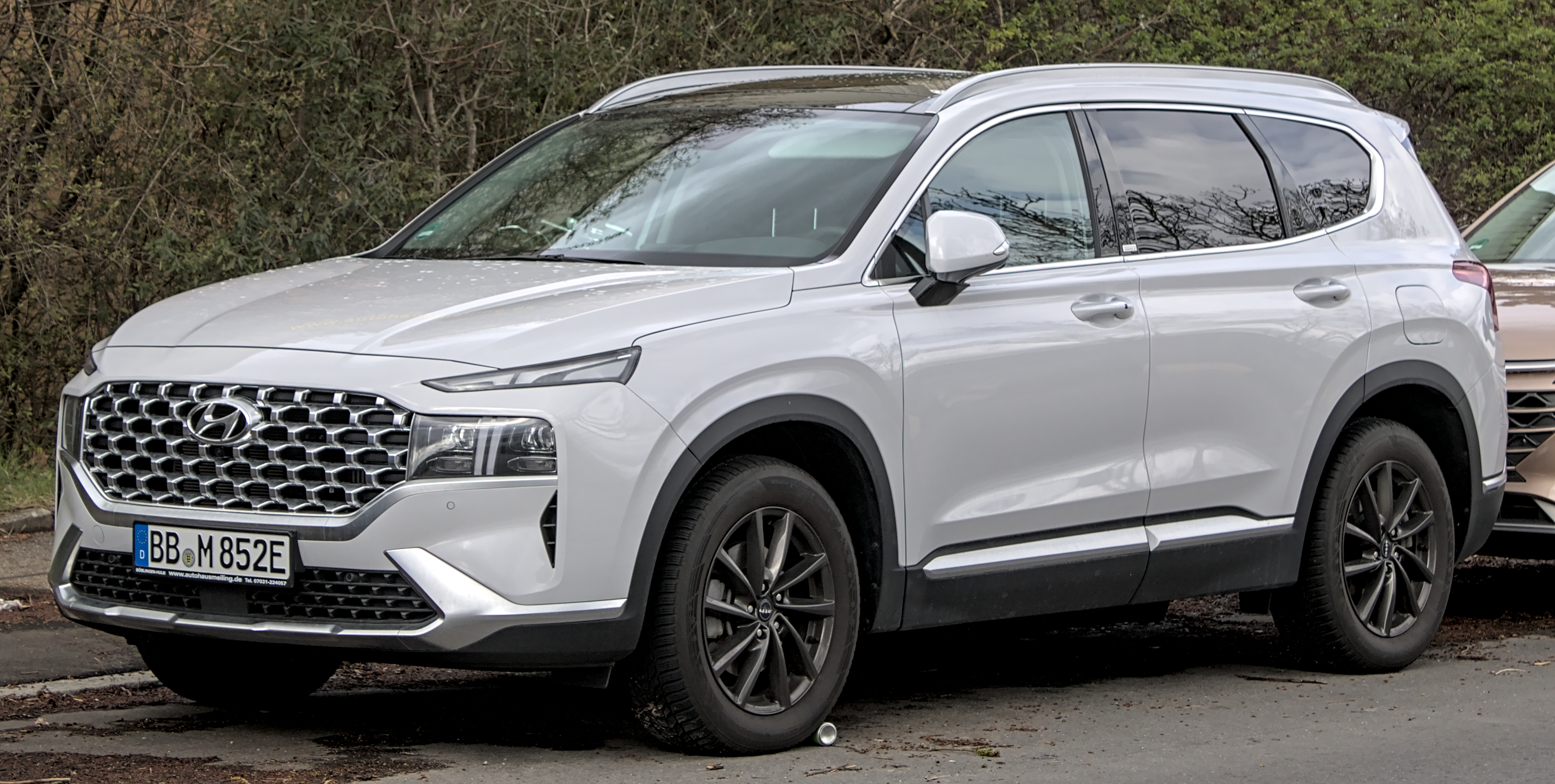
Hyundai added hybrid and plug-in hybrid options for its Santa Fe during a mid-cycle facelift, an uncommon move in the industry as it requires major mechanical and electrical changes.

Between 2019 and 2022, Hyundai Motor Group expanded the availability of hybrid and plug-in hybrid powertrains to several core models across its Hyundai and Kia brands. The Santa Fe Hybrid was introduced for the 2021 model year and the Tucson Hybrid for 2022, both for the first time in those nameplates. The Elantra Hybrid also arrived for the 2021 model year. On the Kia side, the Sorento Hybrid and Sorento PHEV launched for 2021, alongside the K5 Hybrid. PHEV variants of the Santa Fe and Tucson followed for the 2022 model year. Combined Hyundai Motor Group hybrid and PHEV sales grew from approximately 200,000 units in 2018 to over 1.38 million units in 2024.

BYD launched its fourth-generation DM (Dual Mode) plug-in hybrid platform in January 2021, splitting it into the efficiency-focused DM-i and the performance-focused DM-p architectures. The DM-i system, centred on a 1.5-litre Atkinson cycle engine with a brake thermal efficiency of 43%, at the time the highest of any production petrol engine, was designed to price PHEV models comparably to conventional petrol vehicles in the Chinese market, triggering a mass-market shift toward plug-in hybrids in China.

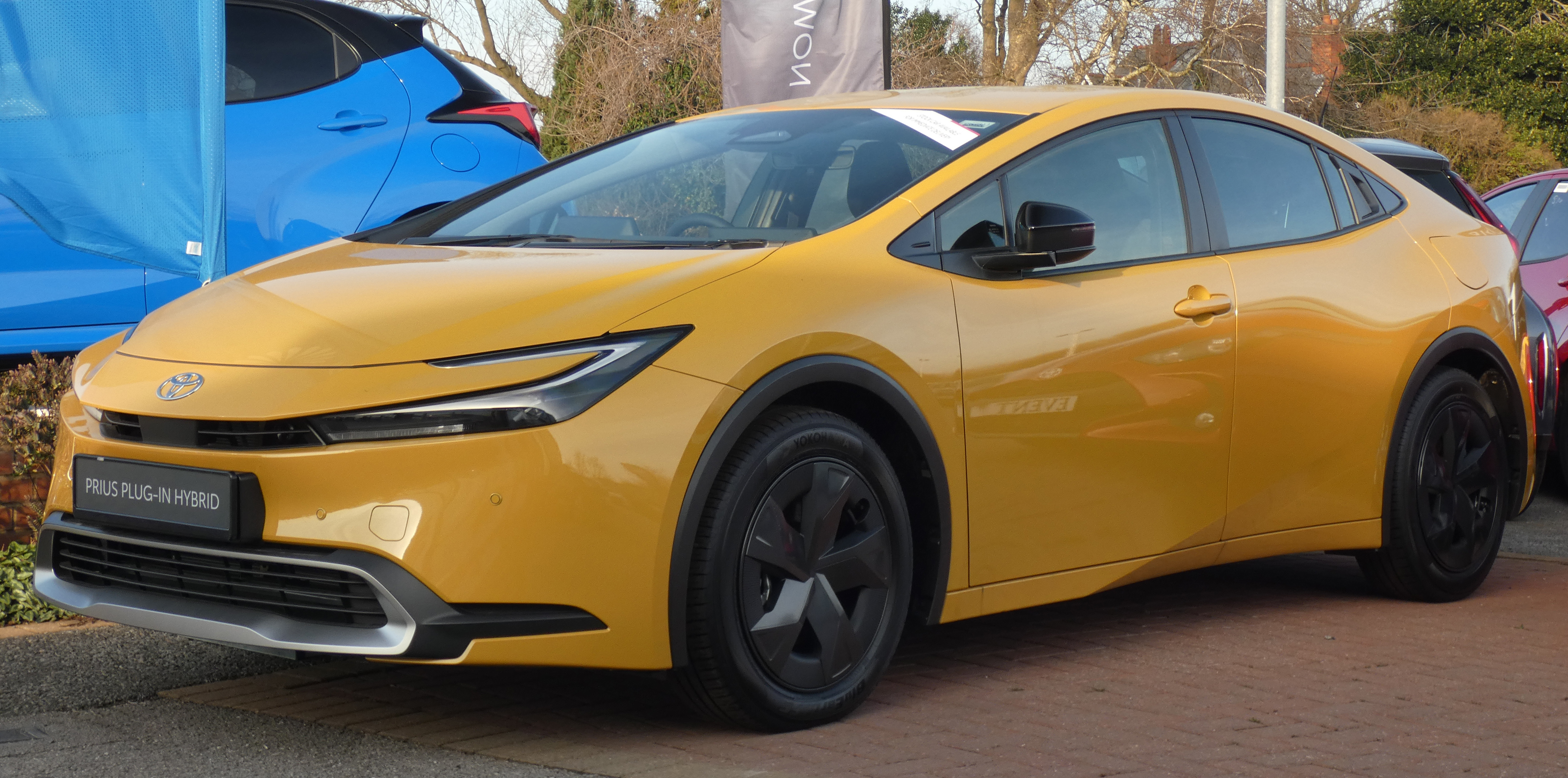
The fifth generation Prius marked major improvements in terms of design and refinement.

Toyota unveiled the fifth-generation Prius at the 2022 Los Angeles Auto Show, going on sale in the United States in January 2023. The fifth-generation Prius raised system output by over 60% to 196 horsepower (199 PS; 146 kW) on all-wheel-drive models while achieving an EPA-rated fuel economy of up to 57 miles per US gallon (4.1 L/100 km; 68 mpg_{‑imp}) combined in front-wheel-drive specification, which is the highest combined rating ever achieved by a non-plug-in Prius. The model won the 2024 North American Car of the Year and 2024 World Car Design of the Year, marking a significant repositioning of the nameplate toward performance alongside efficiency.

Li Auto passed one million cumulative deliveries of its extended-range electric vehicles (EREVs) in China by mid-2023.

==== 2024–2026 ====
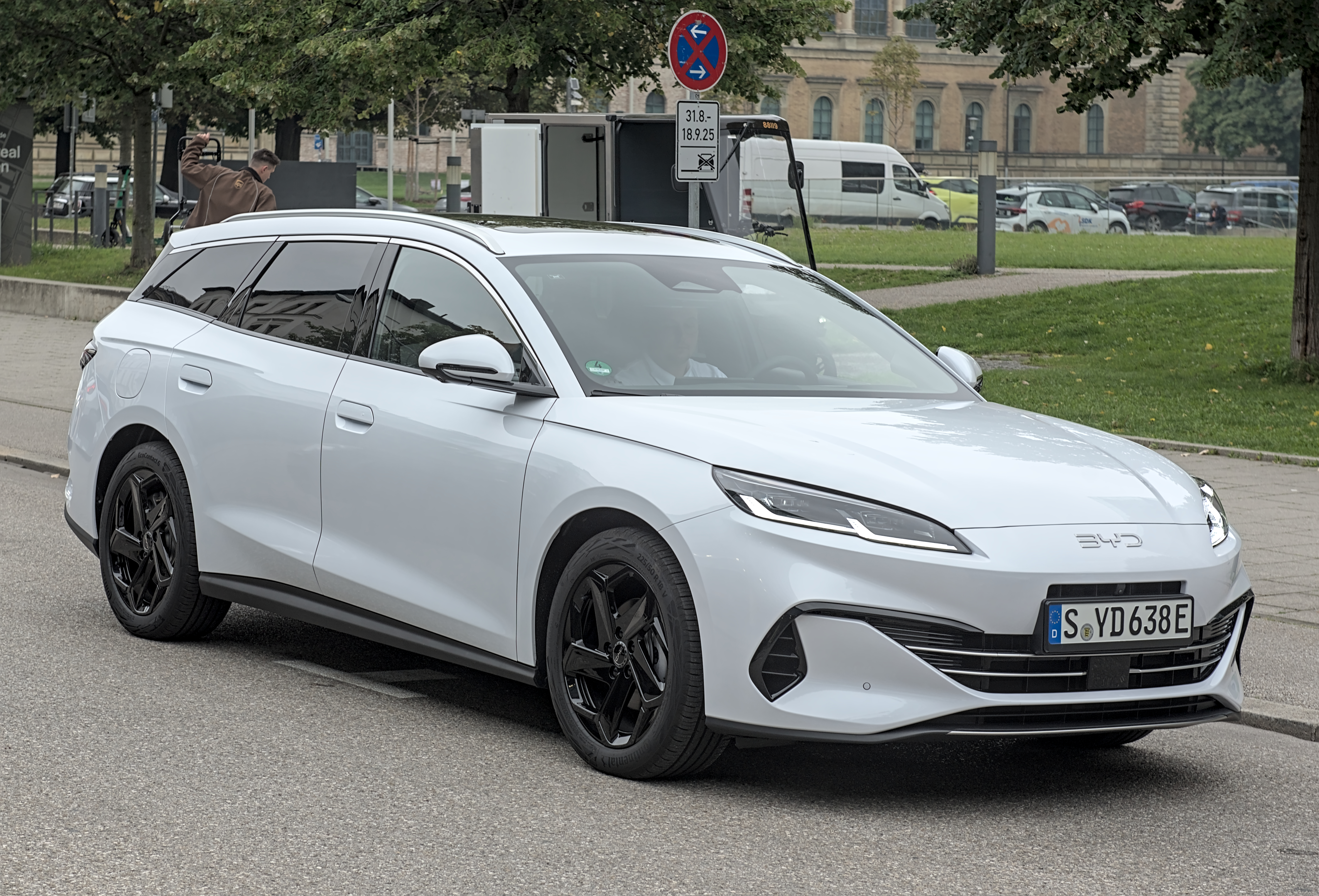
BYD Seal 6 DM-i Touring. BYD became the global leader of plug-in hybrids with nearly 40% market share in 2024.

BYD launched its fifth-generation DM 5.0 plug-in hybrid system in May 2024, featuring an engine thermal efficiency of 46.06%, claimed as the highest of any production petrol engine globally at the time, combined fuel and electric range of up to 2,100 km (1,300 mi) on a single fill and charge, and fuel consumption as low as 2.9 litres per 100 kilometres (97 mpg_{‑imp}; 81 mpg_{‑US}) at low battery charge. The system first entered production on the Qin L DM-i and Seal 06 DM-i models.

Toyota confirmed in mid-2025 that the sixth-generation RAV4, launching for model year 2026, would be offered exclusively as a hybrid or plug-in hybrid in the U.S. and Canada, after it has done so in Australia and Europe. Toyota North America cited the fact that over half of recent RAV4 buyers had already chosen the hybrid variant as the basis for removing the petrol-only option.

In October 2025, BYD unveiled the world's first plug-in hybrid engine capable of running on any ratio of petrol and ethanol to accommodate Brazil's ethanol fuel infrastructure. It was developed over two years by Brazilian and Chinese engineers, and was fitted to the locally assembled Song Pro DM-i.

Geely entered mass production of its i-HEV non-plug-in hybrid system in April 2026, deploying it across the Emgrand, Preface, Xingyue L, and Boyue L models. The system uses a 48.4% thermal efficiency engine with AI-based energy management, reporting fuel consumption of approximately 4 litres per 100 kilometres (71 mpg_{‑imp}; 59 mpg_{‑US}) under normal driving conditions, and marked the beginning of a push by Chinese domestic manufacturers into the conventional (non-plug-in) hybrid segment that had previously been dominated almost entirely by Japanese brands.

Toyota sold a record 5.04 million electrified vehicles globally in fiscal year 2025 (April 2025 to March 2026), with conventional hybrids accounting for the large majority of the total, making it the highest annual electrified vehicle sales figure recorded by any manufacturer.

== Markets and sales ==
Toyota Motor Company (TMC) has led global hybrid electric vehicle sales since the segment's inception, with cumulative worldwide sales of Toyota and Lexus hybrid models surpassing 15 million units in January 2020. Toyota sold a record 5.04 million electrified vehicles globally in fiscal year 2025, an increase of 6.5% year on year, supported primarily by hybrid demand in North America and Europe.

In 2024, global sales of plug-in hybrid and battery electric vehicles combined surpassed 17 million units, a rise of over 25% year on year, equivalent to roughly one in five new vehicles sold worldwide. That total grew further in 2025 to approximately 20.7 million plug-in vehicles, or more than 25% of the global new vehicle market. Conventional (non-plug-in) hybrids also reached a combined global market share of 7.6% of new car sales in the first half of 2025, comparable to plug-in hybrids at the same level.

=== By market ===
==== Japan ====
Japan has consistently held one of the world's highest hybrid market penetration rates among major economies. Cumulative hybrid registrations exceeded 7.5 million vehicles by March 2018, excluding kei cars, representing approximately 19% of all passenger cars on the road at that time. By 2025, conventional hybrids constituted over one-third of all new car sales in Japan, with plug-in hybrids representing an additional 1.0% of the market. The Toyota Prius and Toyota Aqua/Prius c have been the segment's historically dominant models; the Prius was the first hybrid to top annual new car sales in Japan, a position it held from 2009 through 2012, after which the Aqua led for three consecutive years from 2013 to 2015. Japan remains an outlier globally in its strong preference for conventional hybrids over plug-in vehicles, a pattern attributed to limited home charging access and historically strong kei car culture.

==== United States ====
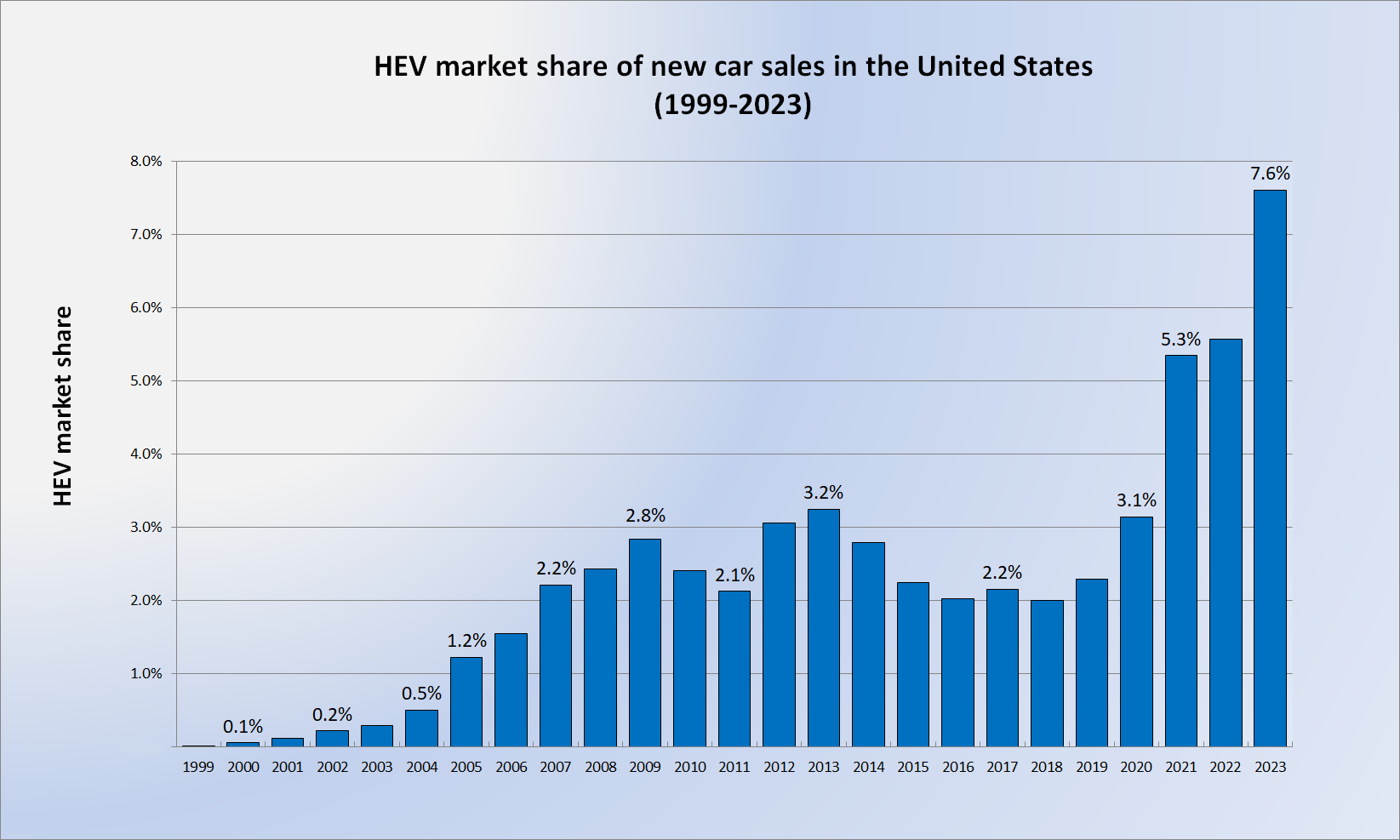
HEV market share of new car sales in the U.S. between 1999 and 2023

The United States hybrid market began in December 1999 when Honda launched the Honda Insight, the first mass-market hybrid sold in the country, with EPA highway ratings of up to 70 mpg. The Toyota Prius followed in July 2000 as a more conventional four-door alternative. Initial sales of both models were modest as petrol prices were low and consumer awareness limited. Growth accelerated after 2004, driven by sustained petrol price increases, peaking at a national average above US$4 per gallon in mid-2008, and federal tax credits under the Energy Policy Act of 2005 offering up to US$3,400 per qualifying vehicle. The cumulative sales three-million mark was achieved in October 2013 and four million in April 2016. The Toyota Prius family led the market with 1,932,805 units sold through April 2016, representing a 48.0% share of total US hybrid sales; the conventional Prius alone accounted for 40.8% of all hybrids sold in the country since the segment's inception. US Prius sales crossed one million cumulative units in April 2011.

Domestic manufacturers were comparatively slow to develop full hybrid systems. Ford Motor Company was the first American automaker to produce one, launching the Ford Escape Hybrid in 2004 as the first hybrid SUV assembled in the United States. General Motors developed a two-mode hybrid system in partnership with DaimlerChrysler and BMW from 2005, launching it in the 2007 Chevrolet Tahoe Hybrid and Saturn Vue Green Line targeting large trucks and SUVs; however, the system's cost and complexity relative to Toyota's power-split architecture limited its commercial reach, and GM subsequently deprioritised conventional hybrids in favour of plug-in technology with the Chevrolet Volt from 2010.

Hybrid sales in the American market achieved their highest market share on record in 2013, at 3.19% of new car sales that year, with Ford recording its own record of nearly 80,000 hybrid units sold — almost triple its 2012 total — as new models such as the Ford Fusion Hybrid and Ford C-Max Hybrid drove competition with Japanese brands. Sales then declined as petrol prices fell sharply during the 2010s oil glut: the hybrid share fell to 2.21% by end-2015 and 1.99% in 2016 before a modest recovery to 2.4% in 2019. Cumulative US hybrid sales reached 5.4 million units through December 2019.

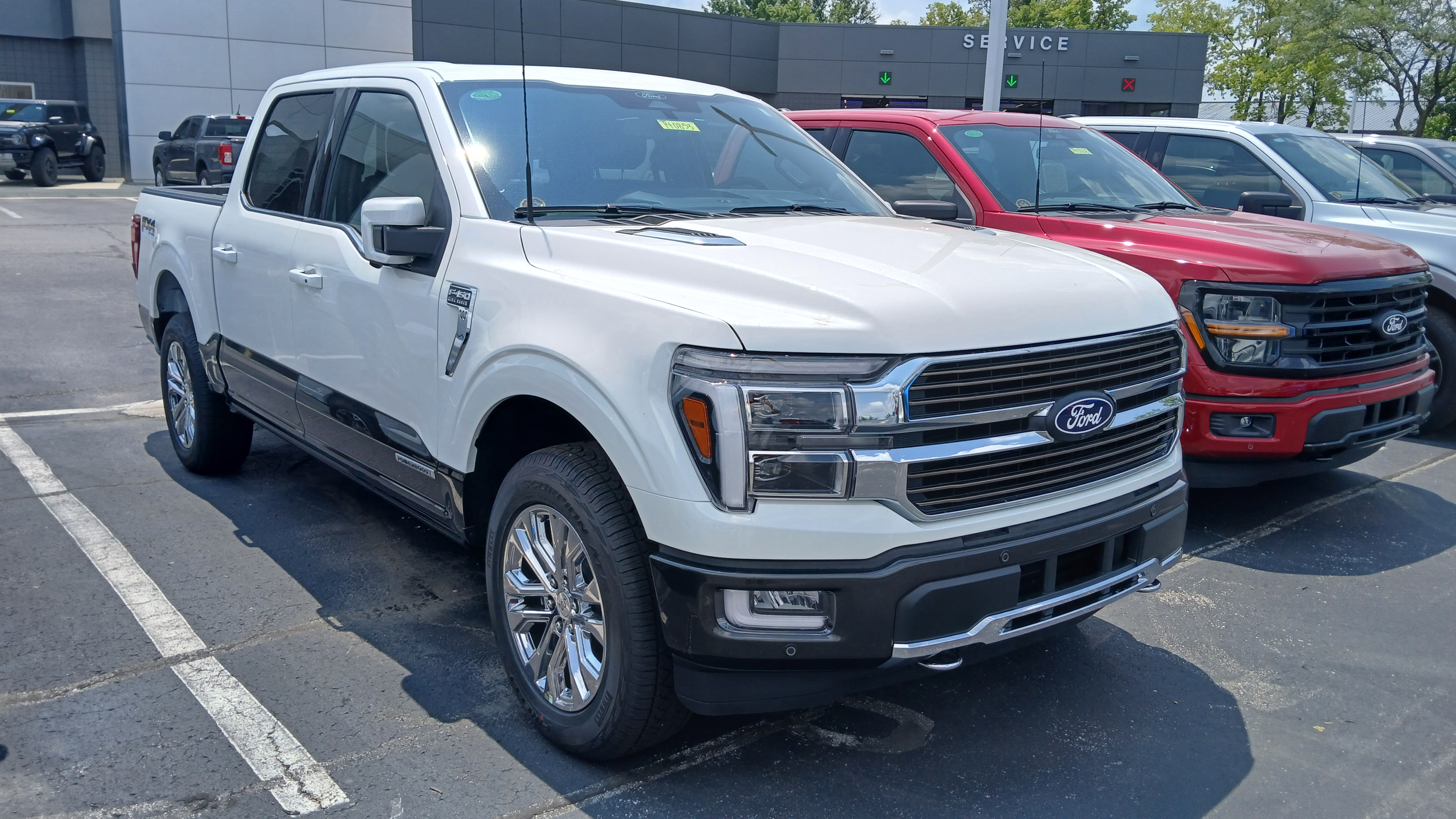
The Ford F-150 Hybrid, marketed as PowerBoost

The Corporate Average Fuel Economy (CAFE) standards, administered by the National Highway Traffic Safety Administration, have been the primary structural driver for hybrid adoption by American manufacturers. Successive tightening of fleet-average targets buy mandating 35 mpg combined by 2020 under the Energy Independence and Security Act of 2007, with further increases projected for 2025 made hybrid versions of high-volume trucks and SUVs commercially necessary as a compliance tool for domestic brands, and directly drove Ford's expansion of the F-150 Hybrid and Maverick Hybrid from the early 2020s.

From 2020 the hybrid segment recovered and accelerated as consumers proved more receptive to self-charging hybrids than to battery electric vehicles, which remained constrained by charging infrastructure gaps, higher purchase prices, and range anxiety outside urban areas. Battery electric vehicles held a market share of approximately 7.5 to 10% in 2024 and 2025, while conventional and plug-in hybrids together climbed toward 20% of all new light-vehicle sales. S&P Global Mobility noted in 2025 that hybrids were "absorbing most of the incremental electrification demand" in the US, as automakers relied on them to meet emissions standards without forcing battery electric vehicles into segments where consumers remained hesitant. Toyota alone sold a record 883,426 electrified vehicles in the United States in 2024, up 56% year on year, with the RAV4 Hybrid and Camry Hybrid among the leading models. Ford's total US hybrid sales reached 187,426 units in 2024, a 40% increase year on year, led by the F-150 Hybrid with 73,845 units and the Maverick Hybrid with 68,752 units. The expiry of the federal clean vehicle tax credit in September 2025 contributed to a sharp decline in plug-in vehicle sales in the subsequent quarter, though conventional hybrid sales were largely unaffected as they had never depended on the credit.

==== Europe ====
The Toyota Prius became the first hybrid electric vehicle sold in Europe in 2000. European consumers, who had been accustomed to the fuel economy and refinement of diesel engines, were slow to adopt the petrol-electric hybrid concept in the early years. The Prius reached 100,000 cumulative European sales only in 2008, a figure that then doubled in just two years as the third-generation Prius arrived and Toyota began extending hybrid powertrains to mainstream models. The Auris Hybrid, produced at Toyota's Burnaston plant in the United Kingdom, joined the European lineup in 2010 as the first Toyota hybrid manufactured in Europe, followed by the Yaris Hybrid in 2012 built in Onnaing, France. Toyota and Lexus cumulative hybrid sales in Europe passed one million units in November 2015 and three million in July 2020.

By 2025, the hybrid and plug-in hybrid segments together had overtaken petrol and diesel combined in the European Union for the first time, with non-plug-in hybrid electric vehicles alone accounting for 34.5% of new EU passenger car registrations across the year, a total of 3,408,907 units registered in the first eleven months of 2025, led by Spain (+26%), France (+24.2%), Germany (+8.7%), and Italy (+7.9%). Plug-in hybrids (PHEVs) averaged a 9% share of new EU registrations in 2025, up 2 percentage points from 2024, with the full-year European PHEV total reaching 1,283,160 units, a 34.2% year-on-year increase and the technology's strongest annual growth rate in four years.

Mild hybrid electric vehicles (MHEVs) were most prevalent in Italy, where they accounted for 31% of new registrations in 2025, and Poland (26%), reflecting those markets' preference for lower-cost electrification. Full hybrid (HEV) shares were highest in France and Poland at 22% each. In France, MHEVs gained 37% in registrations in 2025 versus 2024, as stronger incentives for full plug-in vehicles expired. PHEV shares grew most sharply in the Netherlands and Spain, both adding 5 percentage points of market share in 2025, while Belgium saw a 6-point decline in PHEV share as buyers shifted toward battery electric vehicles.

The best-selling non-plug-in hybrid models in Europe in 2025 were dominated by Toyota. The Yaris Cross Hybrid led with 200,471 units, making it the best-selling car in the European B-segment SUV category overall, followed by the Yaris Hybrid with 166,535 units and the Corolla Hybrid range with 128,544 units. Of the 3,408,907 hybrid electric vehicles registered in the EU in the first eleven months of 2025, Toyota and Lexus models accounted for approximately 74% of the total by manufacturer. Meanwhile, the best-selling PHEV model in Europe in 2025 was the Volkswagen Tiguan PHEV, narrowly ahead of the Volvo XC60 Recharge, and followed by a new entrant, the BYD Seal U.

The growth of the European hybrid market has been driven substantially by European Union fleet-average CO_{2} emissions regulations, which impose mandatory targets on each manufacturer with financial penalties for non-compliance under Regulation (EU) 2019/631. From January 2025, new passenger cars registered in the EU must emit on average 15% less CO_{2} than the targets applicable in 2021, equating to a fleet-wide ceiling of 93.6 g CO_{2}/km under the WLTP cycle; from 2030 the target tightens to 55% below 2021 levels (49.5 g CO_{2}/km).

==== China ====
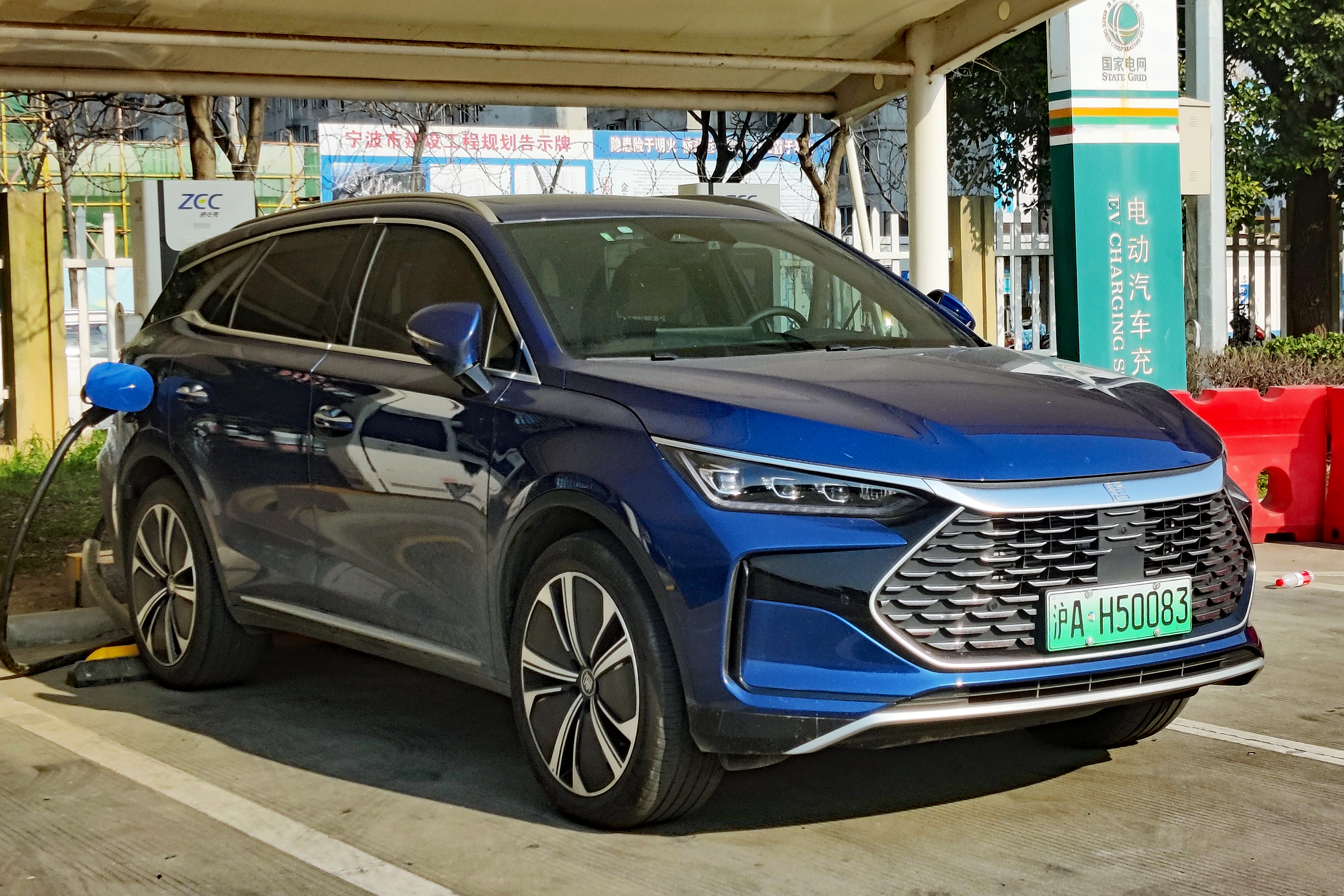
BYD Tang DM-p. BYD is the largest hybrid vehicle manufacturer from China, although they only produce plug-in hybrids.

China is the world's largest plug-in vehicle market and the fastest-growing hybrid market by volume. The country's hybrid landscape is dominated by plug-in hybrids and extended-range electric vehicles (EREVs). In 2025, approximately five million PHEVs and EREVs were registered in China. BYD is the world's largest plug-in hybrid manufacturer, with 2.48 million PHEV sales in China alone in 2024. The best-selling PHEV in China in 2024 was the BYD Song, with approximately 595,000 registrations, followed by the BYD Qin Plus with 341,000 units. China accounted for 70.7% of all global PHEV deliveries in the first half of 2025.

By 2023, dedicated hybrid engines produced by domestic manufacturers including BYD, GAC, Geely, Dongfeng, and GWM had reached thermal efficiencies exceeding 43%, comparable to or exceeding the thermal efficiency of leading Japanese hybrid engines. Average PHEV battery capacity in China grew substantially from around 15 kWh in 2022 to over 30 kWh by 2024.

Conventional (non-plug-in) hybrids remained a minor segment at around 3% of new car sales through 2024, led almost entirely by Japanese brands. However, from 2023 to 2025, several domestic manufacturers began mass-producing non-plug-in hybrid systems intended to compete directly with Toyota's hybrids in the non-NEV market segment. Geely launched its i-HEV system in 2026, which uses a 48.4% thermal efficiency engine with reported fuel consumption of approximately 4 liters per 100 kilometers (25 km/l; 59 mpg_{‑US}) under normal conditions and a Guinness-certified test result of approximately 2.22 liters per 100 kilometers (45 km/l; 106 mpg_{‑US}). Changan and Chery are following similar paths, adopting series-parallel architectures and higher-output electric drive systems. The motivation for this development is in part strategic, as the 2026 policy adjustment reduced purchase tax exemptions for plug-in vehicles. As the financial gap between PHEVs and HEVs narrows, domestic manufacturers see an opportunity to offer a competitive non-plug-in option to buyers in cities where PHEV incentives has been reduced, as well as to buyers in regions with limited charging infrastructure.

China also became the dominant market and producer for extended-range electric vehicles (EREVs), where a petrol engine acts solely as an onboard generator with no mechanical connection to the drive wheels. EREV sales in China reached 1.18 million units in 2024, a 63% annual increase.

==== South Korea ====
South Korea's hybrid vehicle market grew from a negligible base in the early 2010s to one of the highest hybrid penetration rates among major automotive markets globally by the mid-2020s. Hybrid vehicles, predominantly full hybrids from Hyundai and Kia, began registering meaningful annual sales volumes from around 2014 after the Ministry of Land, Infrastructure and Transport (MOLIT) introduced purchase subsidies and tax incentives under successive eco-friendly vehicle master plans, including the 4th Master Plan for Eco-Friendly Cars, which designated hybrids as a transitional technology toward full electrification.

By 2022, hybrid registrations reached 274,282 units, a 29.6% year-on-year increase, surpassing diesel vehicle sales for the first time and representing the largest powertrain category among "green vehicles" in the country. By 2023, approximately 1.5 million hybrid vehicles were registered in South Korea in total, representing 5.94% of the country's entire registered vehicle fleet.

The hybrid share of new domestic vehicle sales climbed consistently from 10.4% in 2021 to 13.2% in 2022, 19.5% in 2023, and 26.5% in 2024. Volume also nearly tripled over the same period, from 149,489 hybrid vehicles in 2021 to 415,921 in 2024.

==== Australia ====
Australia has seen rapid growth in hybrid and plug-in hybrid adoption since the early 2020s. Toyota cumulative hybrid sales in the country reached 500,000 units by January 2025, with nearly half of all Toyota vehicles sold in Australia in 2025 being hybrids. A total of 199,133 hybrid electric vehicles were sold in Australia in 2025, up 15.3% year on year, making hybrids the most popular lower-emissions powertrain type in the country. Plug-in hybrid sales more than doubled over the same period, rising 130.9% to 53,484 units, driven by new entrants including BYD. The top-selling hybrid model in Australia in 2024 was the Toyota RAV4 Hybrid with 55,902 units, followed by the Toyota Corolla Hybrid (19,460) and Toyota Camry Hybrid (14,475).

=== Southeast Asia ===
==== Thailand ====
Thailand is both the largest hybrid vehicle market in Southeast Asia and a major regional production hub for hybrid and electrified vehicles. Conventional hybrid (HEV) adoption in Thailand grew steadily from the early 2010s. From 2020 to August 2024, approximately 700,000 electrified vehicles were registered in Thailand in total, with HEVs representing the largest category, ahead of battery electric and plug-in hybrid vehicles. In Q3 2024, HEV sales grew 60% year on year to 103,686 units, while PHEV registrations declined 23% to 7,303 units. By the first quarter of 2026, HEV registrations had grown to 47,505 units for the quarter, a 29.8% year-on-year increase achieved without material government subsidy support. Toyota holds the dominant position in Thailand's hybrid market.

Thailand's Board of Investment (BOI) supports local hybrid production through its Category 3.8 promotional scheme for HEV and PHEV manufacturing, offering exemption from import duties on machinery and a 50% corporate income tax exemption. However, the government's EV 3.0 subsidy programme has introduced competitive pressure that eroded the market share of Japanese HEV producers.

=== Latin America ===
==== Brazil ====
Brazil is the largest automotive market in Latin America and the only major market to have developed mass-production flex-fuel hybrids, arising from the country's long-established sugarcane ethanol fuel infrastructure. Toyota launched the Corolla hybrid with a 1.8-litre flex-fuel Atkinson cycle engine at its Sorocaba plant in São Paulo state in 2019. It is the world's first production hybrid vehicle capable of running on 100% sugarcane ethanol, followed by the Corolla Cross flex-fuel hybrid in 2021. Toyota had confirmed plans to offer at least one flex-fuel hybrid version of every passenger car it sells in Brazil from 2026.

In September 2024, General Motors announced it would produce two hybrid-flex models at its factories in São Paulo state. BYD inaugurated its Brazilian manufacturing plant in October 2025, simultaneously unveiling a new plug-in hybrid engine capable of running on both petrol and ethanol, to be fitted to the BYD Song Pro assembled locally.

Hybrid and plug-in hybrid sales in Brazil grew strongly in 2024 and into 2025. In the first quarter of 2025, combined HEV, PHEV, and MHEV sales rose 70.5% year on year to approximately 37,000 units, with PHEVs leading at 19,530 units (up 83.6%), followed by MHEVs at 10,724 units and non-plug-in HEVs at 7,402 units. By February 2026, 24 new hybrid models were announced or confirmed for the Brazilian market.

==== Mexico ====
Mexico's hybrid market remained small in absolute terms through the mid-2020s but grew rapidly, with combined hybrid, plug-in hybrid, and fully electric vehicle sales rising 70.2% year on year in 2024 to approximately 109,000 units across January to November. Limited charging infrastructure outside major urban centres has consistently favoured conventional hybrids over plug-in vehicles. Toyota reached 200,000 cumulative hybrid sales in Mexico by late 2025, with HEVs accounting for 36% of its total Mexican sales in the first half of that year across twelve hybrid models. Mexico's integration into North American production networks under the USMCA has made it a manufacturing base for hybrid models exported northward; automakers assembled 204,711 units of hybrid and electric models in Mexico in 2025, a 21% year-on-year increase, including Toyota Tacoma hybrid production in Guanajuato.

== Major manufacturers ==
=== Toyota Motor Corporation ===
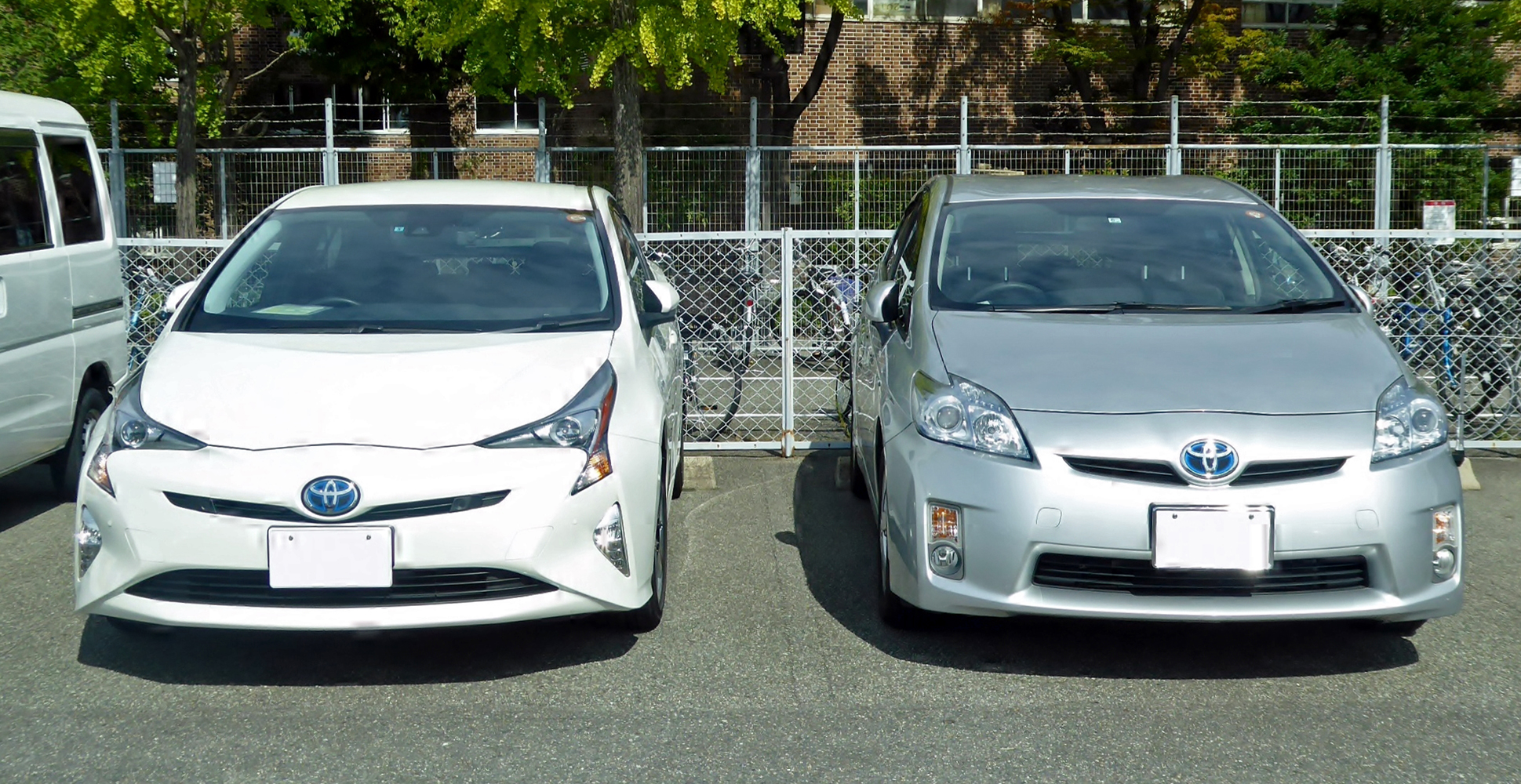
The Toyota Prius is the world's all-time top-selling hybrid, and also in both Japan and the U.S.

Toyota Motor Company (TMC) is the world's largest producer of hybrid electric vehicles by cumulative volume. Its global hybrid lineup, sold under the Toyota and Lexus brands, encompasses conventional full hybrids (HEV) and plug-in hybrids (PHEV); Toyota does not produce mild hybrids (MHEV). Cumulative Toyota and Lexus HEV sales surpassed 15 million units in January 2020 and in fiscal year 2025 (April 2025 to March 2026) the company sold a record 5.04 million electrified vehicles globally, with conventional hybrids accounting for the large majority of that total. In 2024, Toyota sold 4.14 million conventional hybrids and 153,829 PHEVs globally, with PHEVs growing 23.4% year on year; supply constraints on models such as the RAV4 PHEV were cited as limiting further PHEV growth. Toyota has announced a target to grow PHEVs from approximately 2.4% of its US sales volume in 2024 to around 20% by 2030. In Europe, hybrids accounted for 73% of Toyota's total sales mix in 2024, with PHEV sales rising 80% year on year following the launch of the C-HR PHEV.

=== Honda Motor ===
Honda Motor Co. has produced hybrid vehicles since the launch of the Insight in 1999 with its first-generation Integrated Motor Assist (IMA) system, a single-motor parallel layout. Honda introduced a fundamentally different two-motor series-parallel system, initially branded Sport Hybrid i-MMD (intelligent Multi-Mode Drive), with the Accord Hybrid in 2013.

In October 2019, Honda announced the e:TECHNOLOGY branding umbrella for its electrification products and simultaneously renamed its two-motor hybrid system from i-MMD to e:HEV. The designation is not used in the United States, where Honda markets the same vehicles as hybrids without the e:HEV badge.

In 2024, Honda's electrified vehicle sales in the United States reached a record 349,020 units, with hybrids representing approximately 25% of total US sales; hybrid variants accounted for 50% of CR-V sales and 34% of Accord sales in the market. Honda has not offered a PHEV in its mainstream lineup since the discontinuation of the Honda Clarity Plug-In Hybrid in 2021, though the company announced next-generation e:HEV models targeting 2.2 million annual HEV sales globally by 2030, positioning full hybrids as the bridge technology in its transition strategy.

=== Hyundai Motor Group ===
Hyundai Motor Company and its affiliate Kia together form the world's third-largest automotive group and have become significant competitors in both the HEV and PHEV segments. Hyundai Motor sold 634,990 HEVs globally in 2025, a 27.9% year-on-year increase, with HEVs representing a record 15.3% of Hyundai's global sales mix; PHEV sales reached 44,124 units, a 21% increase. Hyundai's key hybrid models include the Tucson HEV and PHEV and the Santa Fe HEV. Kia sold 749,000 electrified vehicles (HEV, PHEV, and battery electric combined) in 2025, a 17.4% year-on-year increase, with hybrids accounting for the majority of that total. In Europe, electrified vehicles represented nearly two-thirds of Hyundai's sales mix in 2025, the highest electrified share of any major non-luxury brand in the region.

=== Ford Motor Company ===
Ford Motor Company has concentrated its hybrid offerings in the full hybrid (HEV) segment, primarily within its truck and SUV lineup. Ford's total US hybrid sales reached 187,426 units in 2024, a 40% increase year on year, led by the F-150 Hybrid (73,845 units, up 47%) and the Maverick Hybrid (68,752 units, up 31%). Ford's plug-in hybrid offerings in the United States include the Escape PHEV. Overall electrified vehicle sales (HEV, PHEV, and battery electric combined) rose 26% year on year in the first quarter of 2025, representing 15% of Ford's total US sales.

=== BYD Auto ===
BYD Auto of China is the world's largest manufacturer of plug-in hybrid electric vehicles by volume. In 2024, BYD sold 2.48 million PHEVs globally, representing 58% of its total passenger car sales; PHEV sales grew approximately ninefold compared to 2021, driven by the adoption of the company's DM-i (Dual Mode intelligent) system across a broad model range. The best-selling PHEV model globally in 2024 was the BYD Song, with approximately 595,000 registrations in China. BYD does not produce conventional non-plug-in hybrids; its entire hybrid lineup requires external charging. The company has begun expanding its PHEV lineup to Europe, Southeast Asia, Japan, and Latin America from 2024 onwards.

=== European manufacturers ===
European manufacturers have pursued mild hybrid (MHEV) technology more extensively than Japanese or Korean counterparts. 48-volt mild hybrid systems, which use a belt-integrated or crankshaft-mounted starter-generator to recover braking energy and assist the combustion engine during acceleration, have become the primary route for European volume manufacturers to reduce fleet-average CO_{2} emissions without the cost of a full hybrid drivetrain. According to the European Automobile Manufacturers' Association (ACEA), over 65% of newly launched electrified ICE-based passenger vehicles in Europe in 2024 carried 48-volt mild hybrid systems.

Stellantis, the group formed by the merger of Fiat Chrysler Automobiles and PSA Group, deploys mild hybrid, full hybrid, and plug-in hybrid technologies across its 14 brands. In Europe, Stellantis held a 15% share of the combined HEV, MHEV, and PHEV segment in 2025, maintaining its position as the leading manufacturer in the European hybrid market by volume. Its hybrid vehicle sales in the EU grew 41% in the first five months of 2024 compared to the same period in 2023, with growth led by models including the Citroën C3, Fiat Grande Panda, and Opel Corsa fitted with the company's eDCT advanced hybrid system. In the United States, Stellantis's Jeep brand leads PHEV sales, with the Wrangler 4xe holding the position of America's best-selling PHEV and the Grand Cherokee 4xe ranking second through 2025.

Volkswagen Group offers 48-volt mild hybrid systems across the Volkswagen, Audi, and SEAT/Cupra brands, as well as PHEVs across Volkswagen, Audi, Porsche, and Škoda. Group-wide PHEV deliveries grew 58% in 2025 to 428,000 units, driven by second-generation PHEV models offering up to 143 km (89 mi) of all-electric range, which saw particularly strong growth in Europe at 72% year on year.

BMW Group applies PHEVs extensively across both the BMW and MINI brands, offering models with all-electric ranges exceeding 100 km on the WLTP cycle, and emphasises PHEVs as a core component of its "technology-open" strategy alongside battery electric vehicles. BMW Group PHEV deliveries grew 27.6% year on year in the first nine months of 2025 to 146,850 units, representing 8.2% of total Group sales; combined with battery electric vehicles, electrified vehicles accounted for 26.2% of Group volume in that period.

Volvo Cars applies 48-volt mild hybrid (MHEV) technology across its range of petrol-engined models, badged as "B" variants, alongside plug-in hybrids badged as "Recharge".

Mercedes-Benz Group applies mild hybrid technology via an integrated starter-generator across its petrol and diesel engines from the C-Class upward, and offers PHEVs across the C-Class, E-Class, S-Class, GLC, and GLE model lines.

== Technology ==
The varieties of hybrid electric designs can be differentiated by the structure of the hybrid vehicle drivetrain, the fuel type, and the mode of operation.

In 2007, several automobile manufacturers announced that future vehicles will use aspects of hybrid electric technology to reduce fuel consumption without the use of the hybrid drivetrain. Regenerative braking can be used to recapture energy and stored to power electrical accessories, such as air conditioning. Shutting down the engine at idle can also be used to reduce fuel consumption and reduce emissions without the addition of a hybrid drivetrain. In both cases, some of the advantages of hybrid electric technology are gained while additional cost and weight may be limited to the addition of larger batteries and starter motors. There is no standard terminology for such vehicles, although they may be termed mild hybrids.

=== Engines and fuel sources ===
==== Petrol ====
Petrol engines are used in most hybrid electric designs and will likely remain dominant for the foreseeable future. While petroleum-derived petrol is the primary fuel, it is possible to mix in varying levels of ethanol created from renewable energy sources. Like most modern ICE powered vehicles, HEVs can typically use up to about 15% bioethanol. Manufacturers may move to flexible fuel engines, which would increase allowable ratios, but no plans are in place at present.

==== Diesel ====
The most prominent example of a full hybrid diesel system is the HYbrid4 by PSA Peugeot-Citroën. It was discontinued in 2016, following the decline in diesel popularity following the VW Dieselgate scandal. Diesel-electric HEVs use a diesel engine for power generation. Diesels have advantages when delivering constant power for long periods of time, suffering less wear while operating at higher efficiency. The diesel engine's high torque, combined with hybrid technology, may offer substantially improved mileage. Most diesel vehicles can use 100% pure biofuels (biodiesel), so they can use but do not need petroleum at all for fuel (although mixes of biofuel and petroleum are more common). If diesel-electric HEVs were in use, this benefit would likely also apply. Diesel-electric hybrid drivetrains have begun to appear in commercial vehicles (particularly buses); as of 2007, no light duty diesel-electric hybrid passenger cars are widely available, although prototypes exist. Peugeot was expected to produce a diesel-electric hybrid version of its 308 in late 2008 for the European market.

PSA Peugeot Citroën has unveiled two demonstrator vehicles featuring a diesel-electric hybrid drivetrain: the Peugeot 307, Citroën C4 Hybride HDi and Citroën C-Cactus. Volkswagen made a prototype diesel-electric hybrid car that achieved 2 L/100 km (140 mpg_{‑imp}; 120 mpg_{‑US}) fuel economy, but has yet to sell a hybrid vehicle. General Motors has been testing the Opel Astra Diesel Hybrid. There have been no concrete dates suggested for these vehicles, but press statements have suggested production vehicles would not appear before 2009.

At the Frankfurt Motor Show in September 2009 both Mercedes and BMW displayed diesel-electric hybrids.

Robert Bosch GmbH is supplying hybrid diesel-electric technology to diverse automakers and models, including the Peugeot 308.

So far, production diesel-electric engines have mostly appeared in mass transit buses.

FedEx, along with Eaton Corp. in the US and Iveco in Europe, has begun deploying a small fleet of Hybrid diesel electric delivery trucks. As of October 2007, Fedex operates more than 100 diesel electric hybrids in North America, Asia and Europe.

==== Human power ====
There are bicycles that consist of an electric motor fitted turned by a generator powered from pedals almost similar to but different from pedal only bicycles. It also combines an Electric battery to store surplus power which can be charged from regenerative braking, from battery chargers like a Battery electric vehicle or Plug-in hybrid and also from the pedal powered generator just like in an internal combustion engine vehicle that uses the engine to charge the battery. It is quite likely that such vehicles are considered hybrids since power to the electric motor is coming from two sources (i.e. pedal power via a generator and battery power).

Liquefied petroleum gas

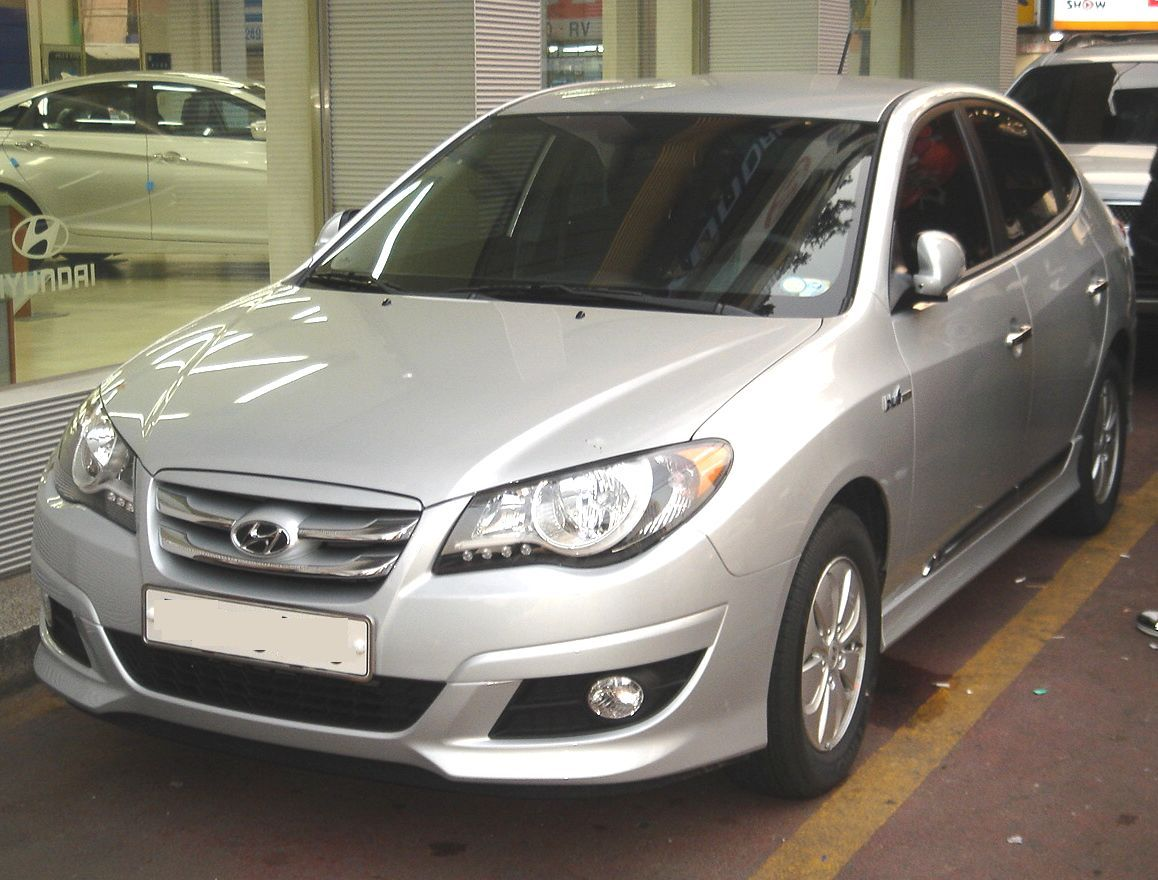
Hyundai Elantra LPI Hybrid

Hyundai introduced in 2009 the Hyundai Elantra LPI Hybrid, which is the first mass production hybrid electric vehicle to run on liquefied petroleum gas (LPG).

==== Hydrogen ====
Hydrogen can be used in cars in two ways: a source of combustible heat, or a source of electrons for an electric motor. The burning of hydrogen is not being developed in practical terms; it is the hydrogen fuel-cell electric vehicle (HFEV) which is garnering all the attention. Hydrogen fuel cells create electricity fed into an electric motor to drives the wheels. Hydrogen is not burned, but it is consumed. This means molecular hydrogen, H_{2}, is combined with oxygen to form water. 2H_{2} (4e^{−}) + O_{2} --> 2H_{2}O (4e^{−}). The molecular hydrogen and oxygen's mutual affinity drives the fuel cell to separate the electrons from the hydrogen, to use them to power the electric motor, and to return them to the ionized water molecules that were formed when the electron-depleted hydrogen combined with the oxygen in the fuel cell. Recalling that a hydrogen atom is nothing more than a proton and an electron; in essence, the motor is driven by the proton's atomic attraction to the oxygen nucleus, and the electron's attraction to the ionized water molecule.

An HFEV is an all-electric car featuring an open-source battery in the form of a hydrogen tank and the atmosphere. HFEVs may also comprise closed-cell batteries for the purpose of power storage from regenerative braking, but this does not change the source of the motivation. It implies the HFEV is an electric car with two types of batteries. Since HFEVs are purely electric, and do not contain any type of heat engine, they are not hybrids.

==== Solar power ====
Some vehicles like mostly cars and occasionally other vehicles combine the solar photovoltaic cell propulsion system with an electric battery that is charged by the solar panel or sometimes like plug-in hybrid vehicles can also be charged from the power grid. These types of vehicles are technically hybrids, although they consist of two types of cells, since both of them use different fuels. The advantage of combining the two systems is that the vehicle can function with the battery if there is no sunlight and also reduces the risk of getting stuck on the road in case of a battery depletion since the solar panels charge the battery simultaneously.

==== Bio-fuels ====
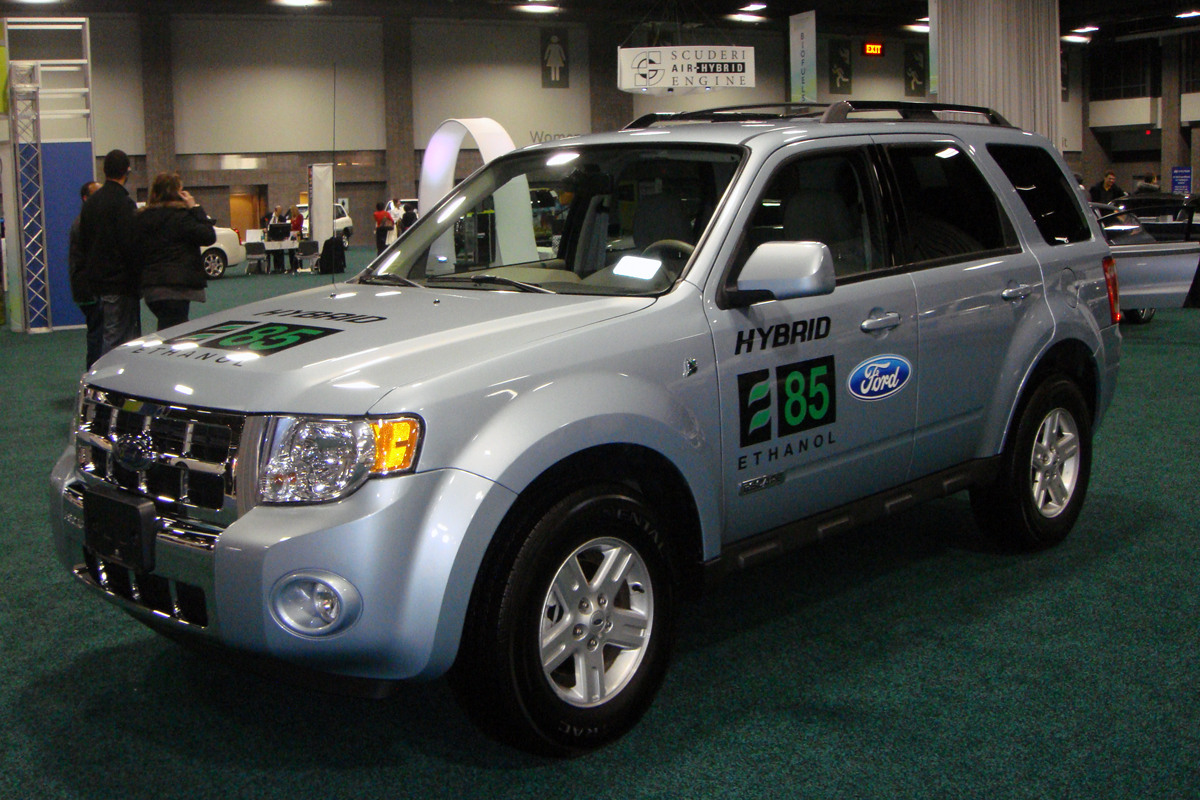
The Ford Escape Hybrid was the first hybrid electric vehicle with a flex-fuel engine capable of running on E85 fuel.

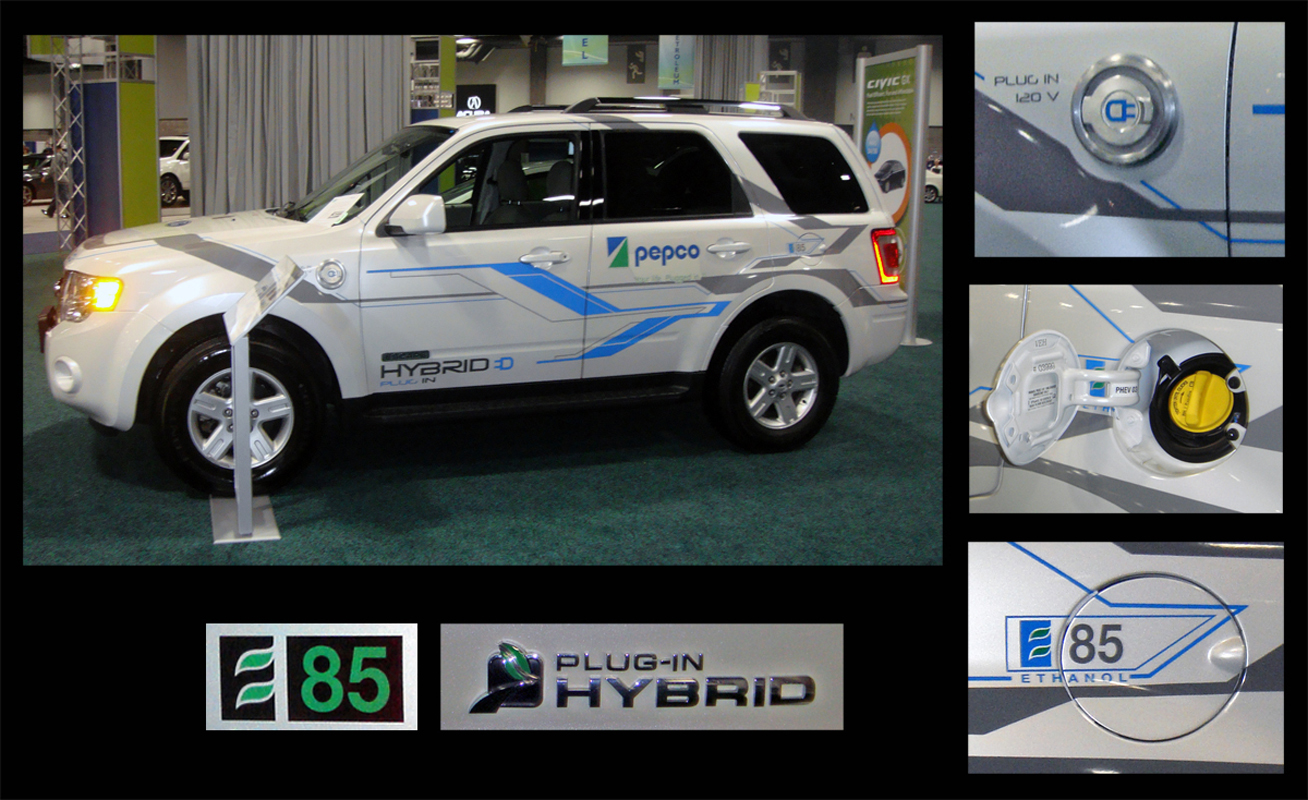
Demonstration Ford Escape E85 flex-fuel plug-in hybrid

Hybrid vehicles might use an internal combustion engine running on biofuels, such as a flexible-fuel engine running on ethanol or engines running on biodiesel. In 2007 Ford produced 20 demonstration Escape Hybrid E85s for real-world testing in fleets in the U.S. Also as a demonstration project, Ford delivered in 2008 the first flexible-fuel plug-in hybrid SUV to the U.S. Department of Energy (DOE), a Ford Escape Plug-in Hybrid, capable of running on petrol or E85.

The Chevrolet Volt plug-in hybrid electric vehicle would be the first commercially available flex-fuel plug-in hybrid capable of adapting the propulsion to the biofuels used in several world markets such as the ethanol blend E85 in the U.S., or E100 in Brazil, or biodiesel in Sweden. The Volt will be E85 flex-fuel capable about a year after its introduction.

=== Design considerations ===
In some cases, manufacturers are producing HEVs that use the added energy provided by the hybrid systems to give vehicles a power boost, rather than significantly improved fuel efficiency compared to their traditional counterparts. The trade-off between added performance and improved fuel efficiency is partly controlled by the software within the hybrid system and partly the result of the engine, battery and motor size. In the future, manufacturers may provide HEV owners with the ability to partially control this balance (fuel efficiency vs. added performance) as they wish, through a user-controlled setting. Toyota announced in January, 2006 that it was considering a "high-efficiency" button.

=== Conversion kits ===
One can buy a stock hybrid or convert a stock petroleum car to a hybrid electric vehicle using an aftermarket hybrid kit.

== Environmental impact ==
=== Fuel consumption ===
Electric hybrids reduce petroleum consumption under certain circumstances, compared to otherwise similar conventional vehicles, primarily by using three mechanisms:

1. Reducing wasted energy during idle/low output, generally by turning the ICE off
2. Recapturing waste energy (i.e. regenerative braking)
3. Reducing the size and power of the ICE, and hence inefficiencies from under-utilization, by using the added power from the electric motor to compensate for the loss in peak power output from the smaller ICE.

Any combination of these three primary hybrid advantages may be used in different vehicles to realize different fuel usage, power, emissions, weight and cost profiles. The ICE in an HEV can be smaller, lighter, and more efficient than the one in a conventional vehicle, because the combustion engine can be sized for slightly above average power demand rather than peak power demand. The drive system in a vehicle is required to operate over a range of speed and power, but an ICE's highest efficiency is in a narrow range of operation, making conventional vehicles inefficient. On the contrary, in most HEV designs, the ICE operates closer to its range of highest efficiency more frequently. The power curve of electric motors is better suited to variable speeds and can provide substantially greater torque at low speeds compared with internal-combustion engines. The greater fuel economy of HEVs has implication for reduced petroleum consumption and vehicle air pollution emissions worldwide

Many hybrids use the Atkinson cycle, which gives greater efficiency, but less power for the size of engine.

=== Noise ===
Reduced noise emissions resulting from substantial use of the electric motor at idling and low speeds, leading to roadway noise reduction, in comparison to conventional petrol or diesel powered engine vehicles, resulting in beneficial noise health effects (although road noise from tires and wind, the loudest noises at highway speeds from the interior of most vehicles, are not affected by the hybrid design alone). Reduced noise may not be beneficial for all road users, as blind people or the visually impaired consider the noise of combustion engines a helpful aid while crossing streets and feel quiet hybrids could pose an unexpected hazard. Tests have shown that vehicles operating in electric mode can be particularly hard to hear below 20 mph (32 km/h).

A 2009 study conducted by the NHTSA found that crashes involving pedestrian and bicyclist have higher incidence rates for hybrids than internal combustion engine vehicles in certain vehicle maneuvers. These accidents commonly occurred on in zones with low speed limits, during daytime and in clear weather.

In January 2010 the Japanese Ministry of Land, Infrastructure, Transport and Tourism issued guidelines for hybrid and other near-silent vehicles. The Pedestrian Safety Enhancement Act of 2010 was approved by the U.S. Congress in December 2010, and the bill was signed into law by President Barack Obama on January 4, 2011. A proposed rule was published for comment by the National Highway Traffic Safety Administration (NHTSA) in January, 2013. It would require hybrids and electric vehicles traveling at less than 18.6 mph (30 km/h) to emit warning sounds that pedestrians must be able to hear over background noises. The rules are scheduled to go into effect in September 2014. In April 2014 the European Parliament approved legislation that requires the mandatory use of Acoustic Vehicle Alerting Systems (AVAS) for all new electric and hybrid electric vehicles, and car manufacturers have to comply within five years.

As of mid-2010, and in advance of upcoming legislation, some carmakers announced their decision to address this safety issue shared by regular hybrids and all types of plug-in electric vehicles, and as a result, the Nissan Leaf and Chevrolet Volt, both launched in late 2010, and the Nissan Fuga hybrid and the Fisker Karma plug-in hybrid, both launched in 2011, include synthesized sounds to alert pedestrians, the blind and others to their presence. Toyota introduced its Vehicle Proximity Notification System (VPNS) in the United States in all 2012 model year Prius family vehicles, including the Prius v, Prius Plug-in Hybrid and the standard Prius.

There is also aftermarket technology available in California to make hybrids sound more like conventional combustion engine cars when the vehicle goes into the silent electric mode (EV mode). In August 2010 Toyota began sales in Japan of an onboard device designed to automatically emit a synthesized sound of an electric motor when the Prius is operating as an electric vehicle at speeds up to approximately 25 kilometres per hour (16 mph). Toyota plans to use other versions of the device for use in petrol-electric hybrids, plug-in hybrids, electric vehicles as well as fuel-cell hybrid vehicles planned for mass production.

=== Top ten EPA-rated hybrids ===
The following table shows the fuel economy ratings and pollution indicators for the top ten most fuel efficient non-PHEV hybrids rated by the U.S. Environmental Protection Agency as of August 2026, for model years 2026 and 2027 available in the American market.

'Economic and environmental performance comparison among EPA's top ten 2015/16 model year most fuel efficient hybrid models available in the U.S. market
Vehicle	Year model	EPA Combined mileage (mpg)	EPA City (mpg)	EPA Highway (mpg)	Annual fuel cost ^{(1)} (USD)	Tailpipe emissions (grams per mile CO_{2})	EPA Air Pollution Score^{(2)}	Annual Petroleum Use (barrel)
Toyota Prius	2026	57	57	56	1100	155	8	5.2
Toyota Prius AWD	2026	54	53	54	1150	163	8	5.5
Hyundai Elantra Hybrid Blue	2026	54	51	58	1150	165	8	5.5
Kia Niro FE	2026	53	53	54	1150	167	8	5.6
Toyota Prius XLE/LTD	2026	52	52	52	1200	169	8	5.7
Toyota Camry HEV LE	2026	51	52	49	1200	173	8	5.8
Hyundai Sonata Hybrid Blue	2026	51	47	56	1200	175	8	5.8
Toyota Corolla Hybrid	2026	51	53	46	1250	176	8	6.0
Toyota Camry HEV AWD LE	2026	50	50	49	1250	178	8	6.0
Hyundai Elantra Hybrid	2026	50	49	52	1250	177	8	6.0
Source: U.S. Department of Energy and U.S. Environmental Protection Agency; Notes: (1) Estimates assumes 15,000 miles (24,000 km) per year (45% highway, 55% city) using average fuel price of US$4.10/gallon for regular petrol and US$5.07/gallon for premium petrol (national average as of 2 August 2026). (2) All states except California and Northeastern states.

== Vehicle types ==
=== Motorcycles ===
Companies such as Zero Motorcycles and Vectrix have market-ready all-electric motorcycles available now, but the pairing of electrical components and an internal combustion engine (ICE) has made packaging cumbersome, especially for niche brands.

Also, eCycle Inc produces series diesel-electric motorcycles, with a top speed of 80 mph (130 km/h) and a target retail price of $5500.

Peugeot HYmotion3 compressor, a hybrid scooter is a three-wheeler that uses two separate power sources to power the front and back wheels. The back wheel is powered by a single cylinder 125 cc, 20 bhp (15 kW) single cylinder motor while the front wheels are each driven by their own electric motor. When the bike is moving up to 10 km/h only the electric motors are used on a stop-start basis reducing the amount of carbon emissions.

In India, Yamaha has a hybrid motorcycle, the Yamaha FZ-S.

=== High-performance cars ===
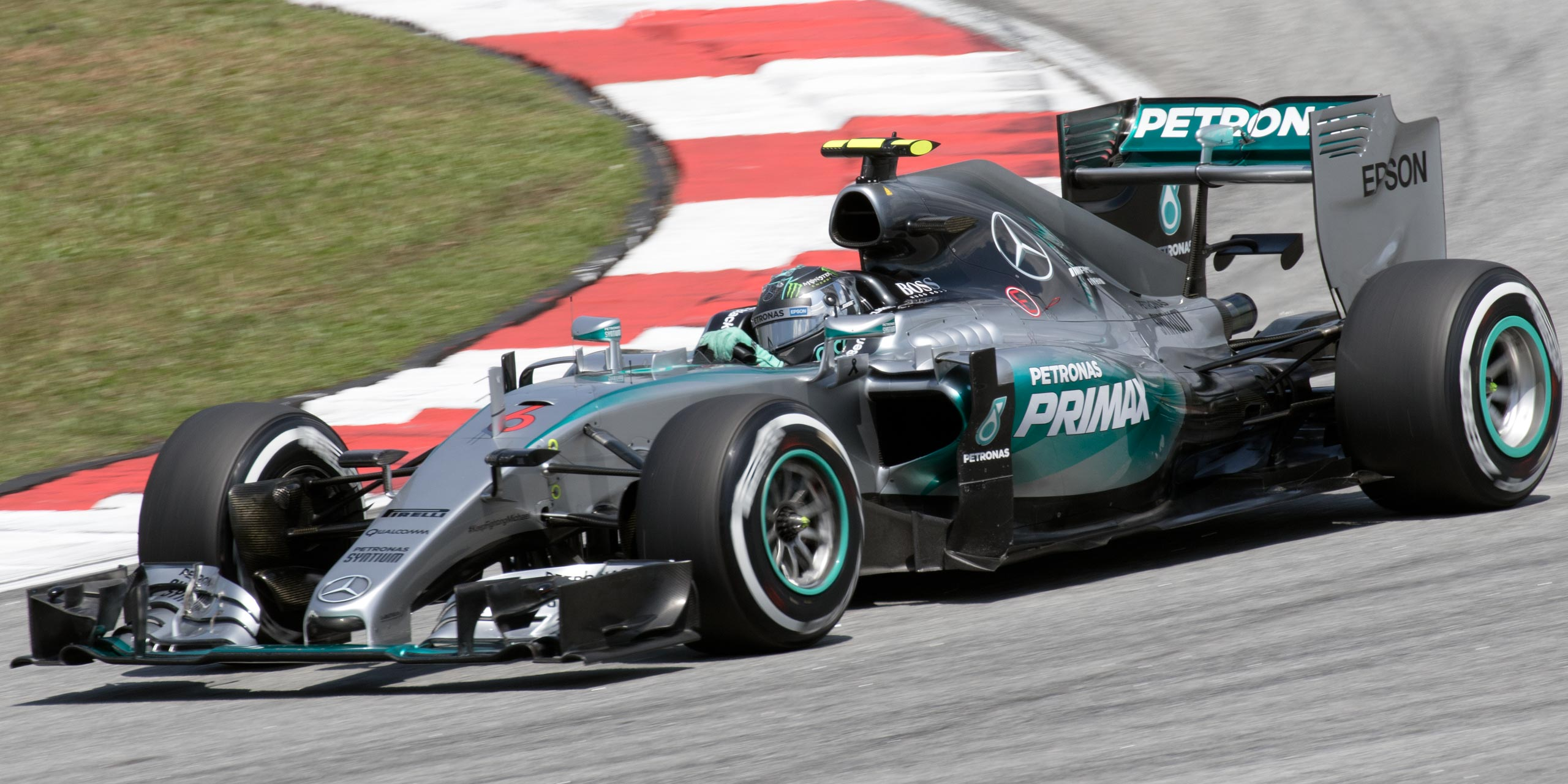
Mercedes F1 W06 Hybrid, driven by Nico Rosberg, during the 2015 Malaysian Grand Prix, using 1.6 L turbocharged V6 hybrid engine

As emissions regulations become tougher for manufacturers to adhere to, a new generation of high-performance cars will be powered by hybrid technology (for example the Porsche GT3 hybrid racing car). Aside from the emissions benefits of a hybrid system, the immediately available torque which is produced from electric motor(s) can lead to performance benefits by addressing the power curve weaknesses of a traditional combustion engine. Hybrid racecars have been very successful, as is shown by the Audi R18 and Porsche 919, which have won the 24 hours of Le Mans using hybrid technology.

=== Formula One ===
Since 2014, Formula One cars have used 1.6 L turbocharged V6 engines, limited to 15,000 rpm. These engines allow Formula One cars to reach speeds of 372 km/h (231 mph), as recorded by Valtteri Bottas at the 2016 Mexican Grand Prix.

=== Taxis ===
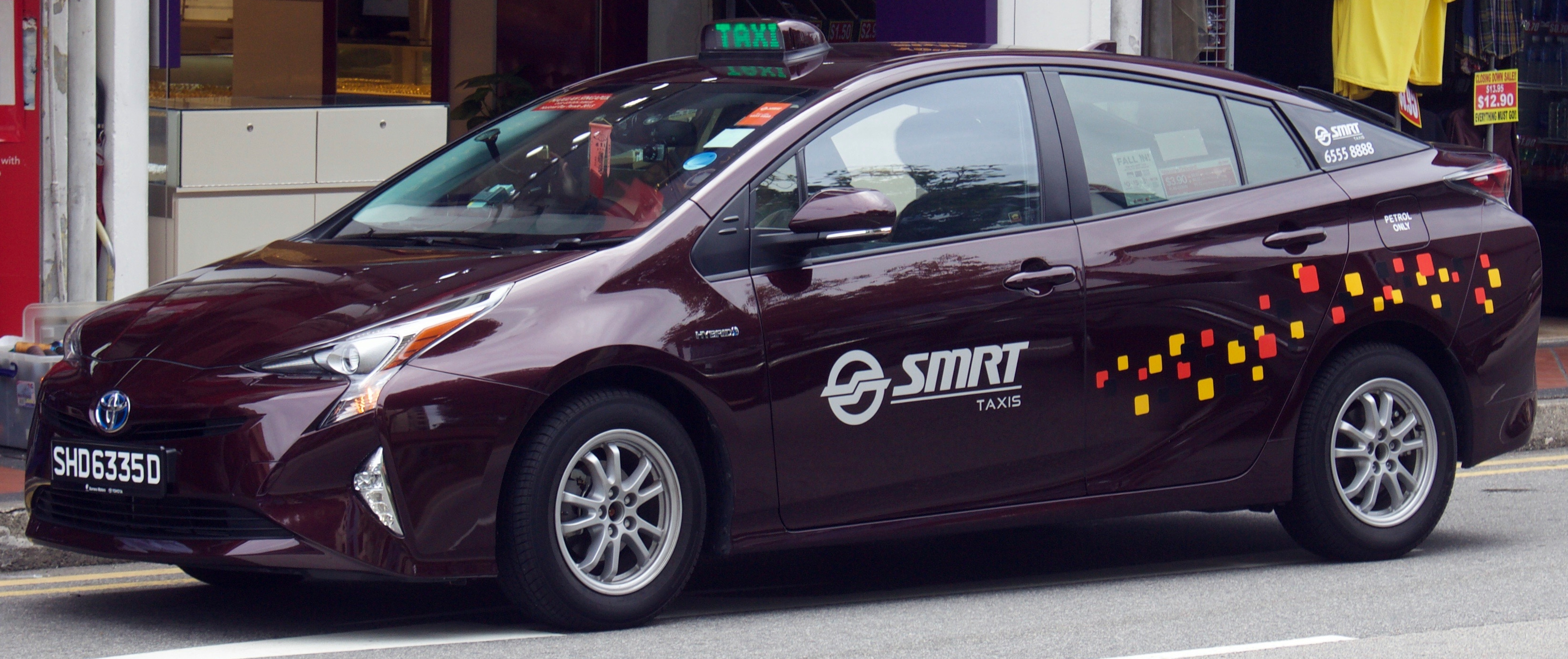
A Toyota Prius hybrid taxi in Singapore

In 2000, North America's first hybrid electric taxi was put into service in Vancouver, British Columbia, operating a 2001 Toyota Prius which traveled over 332,000 km (206,000 mi) before being retired. In 2015, a taxi driver in Austria claimed to have covered 1,000,000 km (620,000 mi) in his Toyota Prius with the original battery pack.

Many of the major cities in the world are adding hybrid taxis to their taxicab fleets, led by San Francisco and New York City. By 2009 15% of New York's 13,237 taxis in service are hybrids, the most in any city in North America, and also began retiring its original hybrid fleet after 300,000 and 350,000 miles (480,000 and 560,000 km) per vehicle. Other cities where taxi service is available with hybrid vehicles include Tokyo, London, Sydney, Melbourne, and Rome.

=== Buses ===
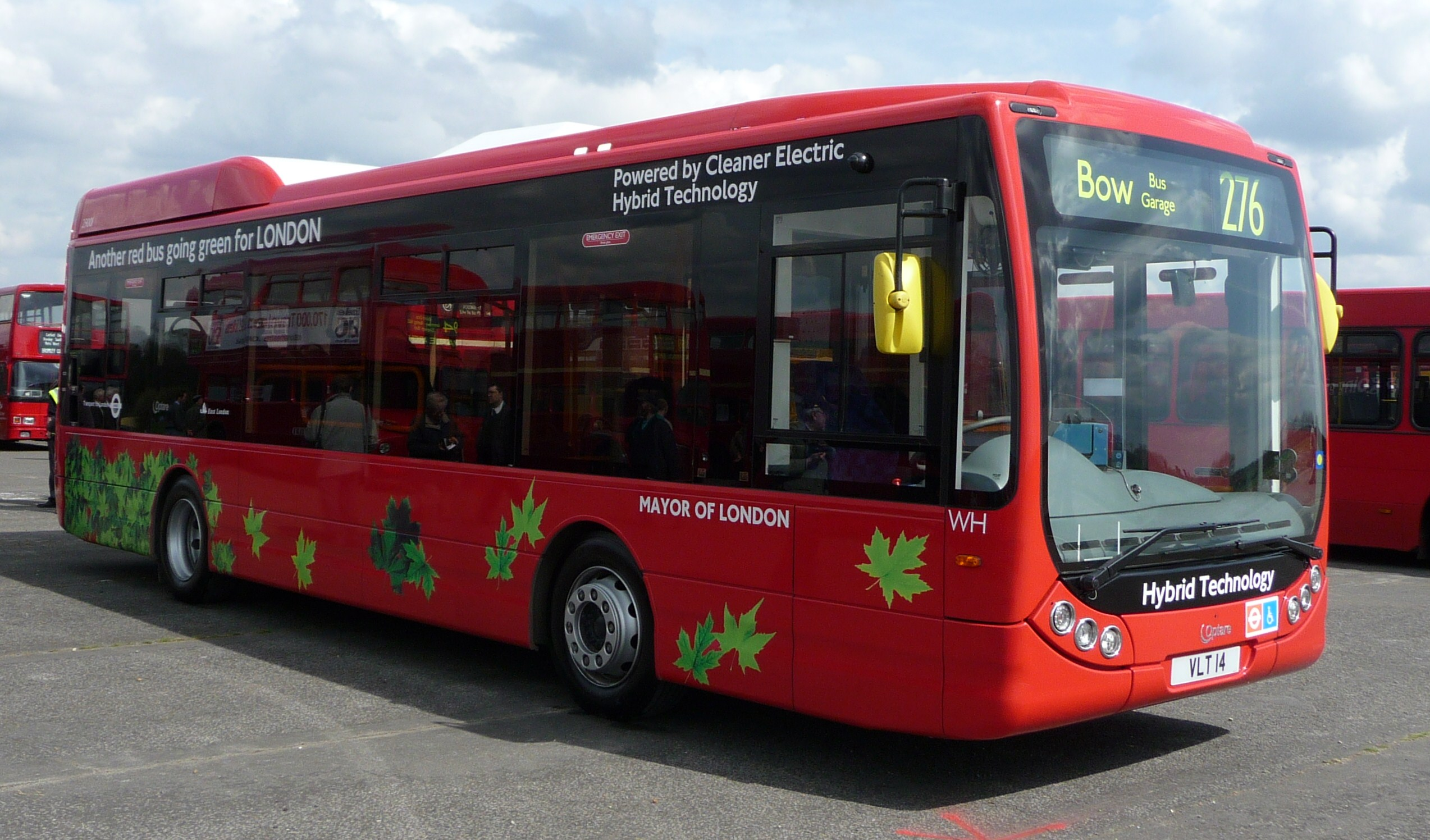
Hybrid-powered bus

Hybrid technology for buses has seen increased attention since recent battery developments decreased battery weight significantly. Drivetrains consist of conventional diesel engines and gas turbines. Some designs concentrate on using car engines, recent designs have focused on using conventional diesel engines already used in bus designs, to save on engineering and training costs. As of 2007, several manufacturers were working on new hybrid designs, or hybrid drivetrains that fit into existing chassis offerings without major re-design. A challenge to hybrid buses may still come from cheaper lightweight imports from the former Eastern bloc countries or China, where national operators are looking at fuel consumption issues surrounding the weight of the bus, which has increased with recent bus technology innovations such as glazing, air conditioning and electrical systems. A hybrid bus can also deliver fuel economy though through the hybrid drivetrain. Hybrid technology is also being promoted by environmentally concerned transit authorities.

=== Trucks ===
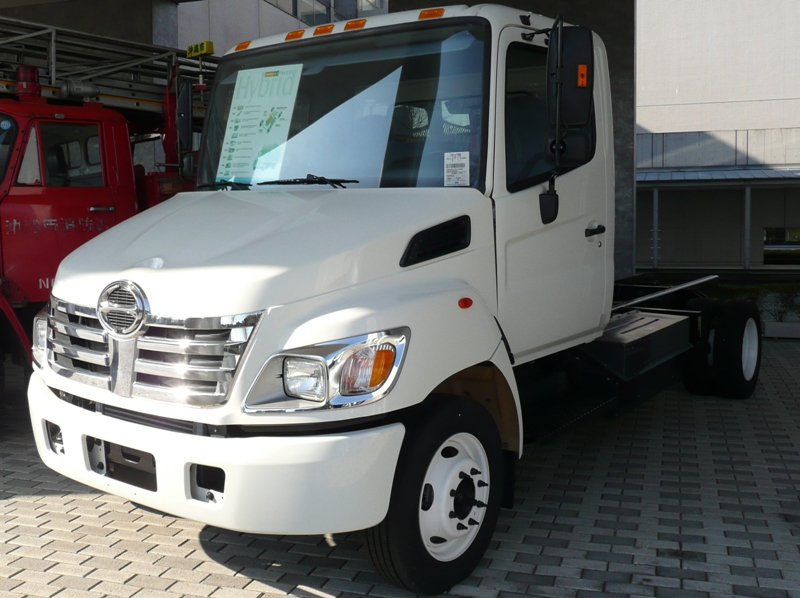
Hino hybrid diesel-electric truck

In 2003, GM introduced a hybrid diesel-electric military (light) truck, equipped with a diesel electric and a fuel cell auxiliary power unit. Hybrid electric light trucks were introduced in 2004 by Mercedes-Benz (Sprinter) and Micro-Vett SPA (Daily Bimodale). International Truck and Engine Corp. and Eaton Corp. have been selected to manufacture diesel-electric hybrid trucks for a US pilot program serving the utility industry in 2004. In mid-2005 Isuzu introduced the Elf Diesel Hybrid Truck on the Japanese Market. They claim that approximately 300 vehicles, mostly route buses are using Hinos HIMR (Hybrid Inverter Controlled Motor & Retarder) system. In 2007, high petroleum price means a hard sell for hybrid trucks and appears the first U.S. production hybrid truck (International DuraStar Hybrid).

Other vehicles are:

- Big mining machines like the Liebherr T 282B dump truck or Keaton Vandersteen LeTourneau L-2350 wheel loader are powered that way. Also there were several models of BelAZ (7530 and 7560 series) in USSR (now in Belarus) since the middle of 1970th.
- NASA's huge Crawler-Transporters are diesel-electric.
- Mitsubishi Fuso Canter Eco Hybrid is a diesel-electric commercial truck.
- Azure Dynamics Balance Hybrid Electric is a petrol-hybrid electric medium dutry truck based on the Ford E-450 chassis.
- Hino Motors (a Toyota subsidiary) has the world's first production hybrid electric truck in Australia (110 kW or 150 hp diesel engine plus a 23 kW or 31 hp electric motor).

Other hybrid petroleum-electric truck makers are DAF Trucks, MAN with MAN TGL Series, Nissan Motors and Renault Trucks with Renault Puncher.

Hybrid electric truck technology and powertrain maker: ZF Friedrichshafen, EPower Engine Systems.

By a voice vote, the United States House of Representatives approved the Heavy Duty Hybrid Vehicle Research, Development, and Demonstration Act of 2009 (for heavy duty plug-in hybrid vehicles) authored by representative James Sensenbrenner.

=== Military vehicles ===
Some 70 years after Porsche's pioneering efforts in hybrid-drivetrain armoured fighting vehicles in World War II, the United States Army's manned ground vehicles of the Future Combat System all use a hybrid electric drive consisting of a diesel engine to generate electrical power for mobility and all other vehicle subsystems. However, all FCS land vehicles were put on hold in the 2010 DOD budget. Other military hybrid prototypes include the Millenworks Light Utility Vehicle, the International FTTS, HEMTT model A3, and the Shadow RST-V.

China's Type 100 tank, which debuted in 2025, is the world's first hybrid armoured fighting vehicle in service.

=== Locomotives ===
In May 2003, JR East started test runs with the so-called NE (new energy) train and validated the system's functionality (series hybrid with lithium-ion battery) in cold regions. In 2004, Railpower Technologies had been running pilots in the US with the so-called Green Goats, which led to orders by the Union Pacific and Canadian Pacific Railways starting in early 2005.

Railpower offers hybrid electric road switchers, as does GE. Diesel-electric locomotives may not always be considered HEVs, not having energy storage on board, unless they are fed with electricity via a collector for short distances (for example, in tunnels with emission limits), in which case they are better classified as dual-mode vehicles.

=== Marine and other aquatic ===
For large boats that are already diesel-electric, the upgrade to hybrid can be as straightforward as adding a large battery bank and control equipment; this configuration can provide fuel saving for the operators as well as being more environmentally sensitive.

Producers of marine hybrid propulsion include:

- eCycle Inc.
- Solar Sailor Holdings

=== Aircraft ===
A hybrid electric aircraft is an aircraft with a hybrid electric powertrain, as the energy density of lithium-ion batteries is much lower than aviation fuel, it effectively increase the range compared to pure electric aircraft. By May 2018, there were over 30 projects, and short-haul hybrid-electric airliners are envisioned by 2032. The most advanced are the Zunum Aero 10-seater, the Airbus E-Fan X demonstrator, the VoltAero Cassio, the UTC modified Bombardier Dash 8, and the Ampaire Electric EEL.

== Hybrid premium and showroom cost parity ==
Fuel use in vehicle designs
Vehicle type	Fuel used
Combustion-only vehicle (ICE)	Exclusively uses petroleum or other fuel.
Micro hybrid electric vehicle (μHEV)	Exclusively uses petroleum or other fuel, but can shut off engine to consume less.
Mild hybrid electric vehicle (MHEV, BAHV)	Exclusively uses petroleum or other fuel, but has electric battery to consume less.
Plug-in hybrid vehicle (PHEV)	Uses mixture of petroleum or other fuel and electricity from power grid.
All-electric vehicle (BEV, AEV)	Exclusively uses electricity from power grid.
Fuel cell vehicle (FCV, FCEV)	Exclusively uses hydrogen or other fuel to generate electricity.

HEVs can be initially more expensive (the so-called "hybrid premium") than pure fossil-fuel-based ICE vehicles, due to extra batteries, more electronics and in some cases other design considerations (although battery renting can be used to reach the cost parity). The trade-off between higher initial cost (also called showroom costs) and lower fuel costs (difference often referred to as the payback period) is dependent on usage – miles traveled, or hours of operation, fuel costs, and in some cases, government subsidies. Traditional economy vehicles may result in a lower direct cost for many users (before consideration of any externality).

Consumer Reports ran an article in April 2006 stating that HEVs would not pay for themselves over five years of ownership. However, this included an error with charging the "hybrid premium" twice. When corrected, the Honda Civic Hybrid and Toyota Prius did have a payback period of slightly less than five years. This includes conservative estimates with depreciation (seen as more depreciation than a conventional vehicle, although that is not the prevailing norm) and with progressively higher gas prices. In particular, the Consumer Reports article assumed $2/U.S. gallon for three years, $3/U.S. gallon for one year and $4/U.S. gallon the last year. As recent events have shown, this is a volatile market and hard to predict. For 2006, gas prices ranged from low $2 to low $3, averaging about $2.60/U.S. gallon.

A January 2007 analysis by Intellichoice.com shows that all 22 available HEVs will save their owners money over a five-year period. The most savings is for the Toyota Prius, which has a five-year cost of ownership 40.3% lower than the cost of comparable non-hybrid vehicles.

A report in the Greeley Tribune says that over the five years it would typically take for a new car owner to pay off the vehicle cost differential, a hybrid Camry driver could save up to US$6,700 in petrol at June 2007 petrol prices, with hybrid tax incentives as an additional saving.

In countries with incentives to fight against global warming and contamination and promote vehicle fuel efficiency, the pay-back period can be immediate, and all-combustion-engine vehicles can cost more than hybrids because they generate more pollution.

Toyota and Honda have halved the incremental cost of electric hybrids and see cost parity in the future (even without incentives).

== Raw materials shortage ==
The rare-earth element dysprosium, as well as many others, are required to fabricate many of the advanced electric motors and battery systems in hybrid propulsion systems.

However, some rare-earth elements and other minerals crucial to the manufacturing of lithium-ion batteries, such as lithium and nickel, face supply shortages. This has prompted key industry figures, such as Jim Farley and Elon Musk, to voice their interest in increasing mining of these resources. It is anticipated that demand in automotive applications for lithium and cobalt will increase by 18- and 37-fold, respectively, between 2015 and 2030; demand for other ores needed for the manufacturing of copper, vanadium, chromium, and aluminium is also expected to rise. It is forecasted that supplies for some of these materials could, under increased market pressure consistent with estimations, be drained in decades.

== Legislation and incentives ==
In order to encourage the purchase of HEVs, several countries have introduced legislation for incentives and ecotaxes.

=== Canada ===
Residents of Ontario and Quebec in Canada can claim a rebate on the Provincial Retail Sales Tax of up to Can$2,000 on the purchase or lease of a hybrid electric vehicle. Ontario has a green license plate for hybrid car users and was to announce a slew of benefits to go along with it in 2008. Residents in British Columbia are eligible for a 100% reduction of sales tax up to a maximum of $2,000 if the hybrid electric vehicle is purchased or leased before April 1, 2011 (extended in 2007/2008 budget from March 31, 2008, and expanded from a maximum of only $1,000 from April 1, 2008, to March 31, 2009, at which point the concession was scheduled to expire). Prince Edward Island residents can claim rebates on the Provincial Sales Tax of up to Can$3,000 on the purchase or lease of any hybrid vehicles since March 30, 2004.

=== Israel ===
In Haifa, hybrid vehicles are entitled to free parking in city's parking lots for domestic citizens. Other cities, such as Petah-Tikva, have quickly adopted similar free parking for hybrid cars.

=== Japan ===
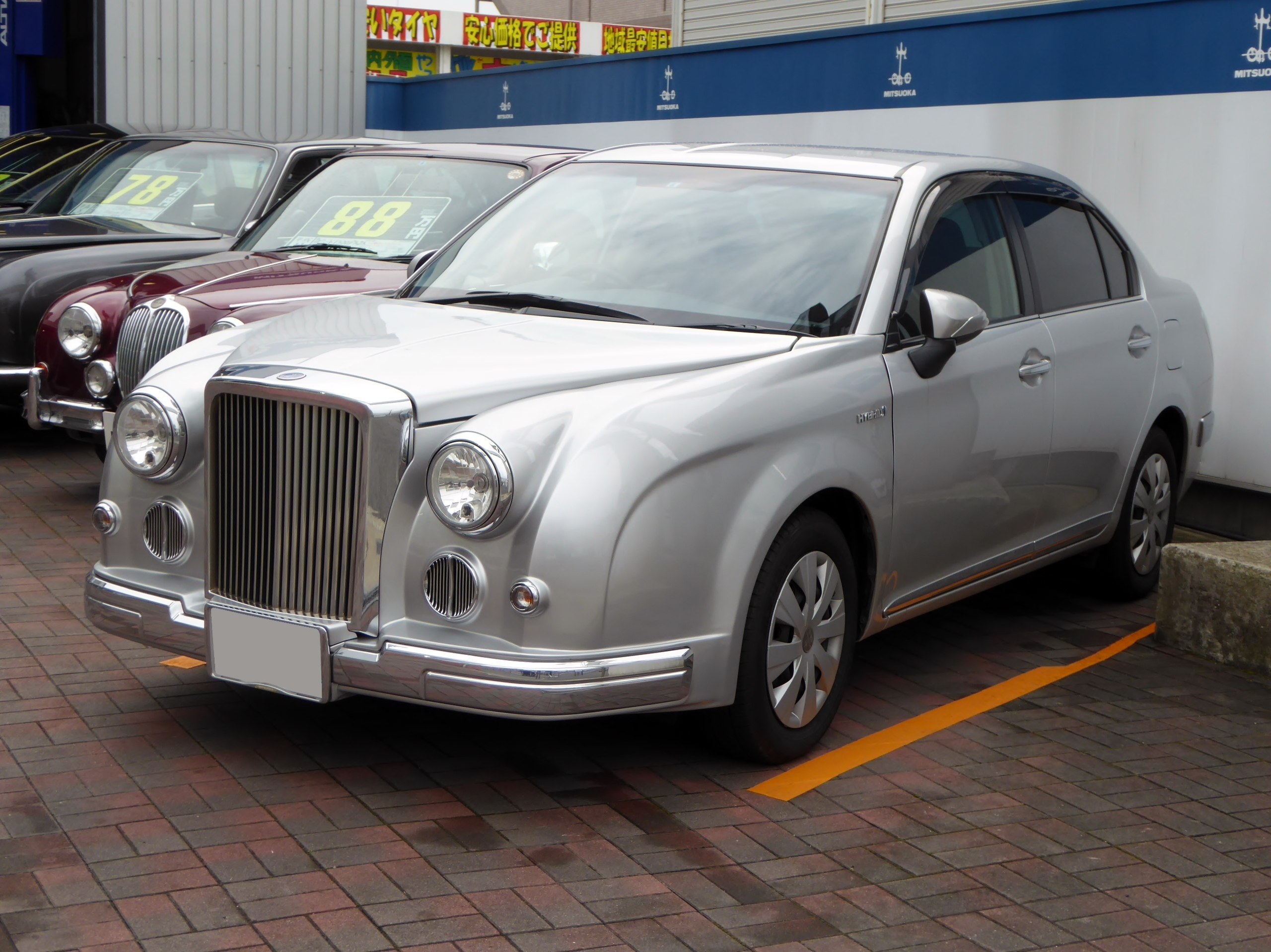
Mitsuoka Motor Ryugi hybrid (E165)

In 2009 the Japanese government implemented a set of policies and incentives that included a scrappage program, tax breaks on hybrid vehicles and other low emission cars and trucks, and a higher levy on petrol that raised prices in the order of US$4.50 per gallon. New hybrid car sales for 2009 were almost triple those for 2008.

=== Jordan ===
In Jordan, customs and sales tax reduced for all hybrid vehicles from 55% to 25% of the vehicle list price, 12.5% customs fees and sales tax, if the new hybrid is a replacement for an old car (more than 10 years age). However, in March 2018, the government resorted to imposing the 55% customs and sales tax back again in its efforts to increase revenue.

=== Malaysia ===
In Malaysia, since mid 2014 all (CBU) fully imported hybrid and EV cars sold in Malaysia significantly increased in price after the CBU hybrid and EV incentive package that expired on December 31, 2013. The affected cars are Toyota Prius, Toyota Prius c, Honda Civic Hybrid, Honda Insight, Honda CR-Z, Lexus CT200h, Audi A6 Hybrid, Mitsubishi i-MiEV and Nissan Leaf. However the exemption of excise duties and import taxes for hybrids and EV will be extended for models that are (CKD) assembled in Malaysia. The exemption will be extended until December 31, 2015, for hybrids and December 31, 2017, for EVs. Only the locally assembled Honda Jazz Hybrid, Mercedes-Benz S400 L Hybrid, Toyota Camry Hybrid and the facelifted Nissan Serena S-Hybrid are entitled for hybrid inducements.

=== Netherlands ===
In the Netherlands, the vehicle registration tax (VRT), payable when a car is sold to its first buyer, can earn the owner of an HEV a discount up to €6,000.

=== New Zealand ===
In Christchurch, hybrid vehicles are entitled to an hour free parking in city council parking buildings. Where those buildings already provide an hour free, hybrid vehicles are entitled to an extra hour free.

=== Republic of Ireland ===
In the Republic of Ireland, a discount of up to €1500 on VRT for hybrids, and up to €2500 for plugin hybrids was available until 31 December 2012. Previously there was a potential reduction of 50% of VRT applicable before July 2008, when VRT rates were based on engine size, rather than the CO_{2} emissions system. Some concerns were raised regarding the loss of VRT revenue due to the high number of expensive, luxury SUV hybrids imported, and also noting their large engine size, that in highway/extra-urban, and combined driving conditions may have negated much of the Hybrid engine arrangement emissions benefits (The Irish Times 11/11/2006).

=== Sweden ===
In Sweden there is an "Eco car" subsidy of SEK 10,000 (~ US$1,600) cash payout to private car owners. For fringe benefit cars there is a reduction of the benefit tax of 40% for EVs and HEVs and 20% for other "Eco cars".

=== United Kingdom ===
Drivers of HEVs in the United Kingdom benefit from the lowest band of vehicle excise duty (car tax), which is based on carbon dioxide emissions. In central London, these vehicles may be eligible for a discount on the daily London congestion charge. Due to their low levels of regulated emissions, the greenest cars are eligible for a discount under the incentive system. To be eligible the car had to be on the Power Shift Register. As of 2007, these included the cleanest LPG and natural gas cars and some hybrid-, battery- and fuel cell-electric vehicles.

=== United States ===
==== Federal ====
Through to December 31, 2010, the IRS permitted the purchaser of a hybrid electric car a federal income tax credit up to $3,400. The tax credit was to be phased out two calendar quarters after the manufacturer reached 60,000 new cars sold in the following manner: it was reduced to 50% if delivered in either the third or fourth quarter after the threshold was reached, to 25% in the fifth and sixth quarters, and 0% thereafter.

As of April 2010, three auto manufactures reached the 60,000 cap; Toyota Motor Company reached it in 2007, Honda in 2008, and as of April 1, 2010, no Ford Motor Company hybrid vehicles remained eligible for this tax credit. Vehicles purchased after December 31, 2010, are not eligible for this credit, as this benefit will expire on this date.

==== States and local ====
- Certain states (e.g., California, Florida, New York, and Virginia) allowed singly occupied HEVs to enter the HOV lanes on the highway. Initially, the Federal Highway Administration ruled that this was a violation of federal statute until August 10, 2005, when George W. Bush signed the Transportation Equity Act of 2005 into law. In California, a total of 85,250 owners of the three eligible hybrid models benefited from free access to HOV lanes from 2004 to mid-2011. This incentive expired on July 1, 2011, and now hybrids are required to comply the minimum passenger requirements to use the HOV lanes.
- Some states, e.g., California, exempted hybrid electric cars from the biennial smog inspection, which costs over $50 (as of 2004).
- Until 2007, the city of San Jose, California, issued a free parking tag for hybrid electric cars purchased at San Jose dealerships, after which the tag began being issued for a fee annually. The qualified owners did not have to pay for parking in any city garage or at roadside parking meters.
- Beginning October 1, 2004, the city of Los Angeles, California, offers free parking to all HEVs. The experiment is an extension to an existing offer of free parking for all pure electrical vehicles.
- In October 2005, the city of Baltimore, Maryland, started to offer discount on monthly parking in the city parking lots, and is considering free meter parking for HEVs.
- On 3 November 2005, The Boston Globe reported that Boston's city council was considering the same treatment for hybrid electric cars.
- Annual vehicle registration fees in Washington, D.C., are $36, half those paid for conventional vehicles ($72).
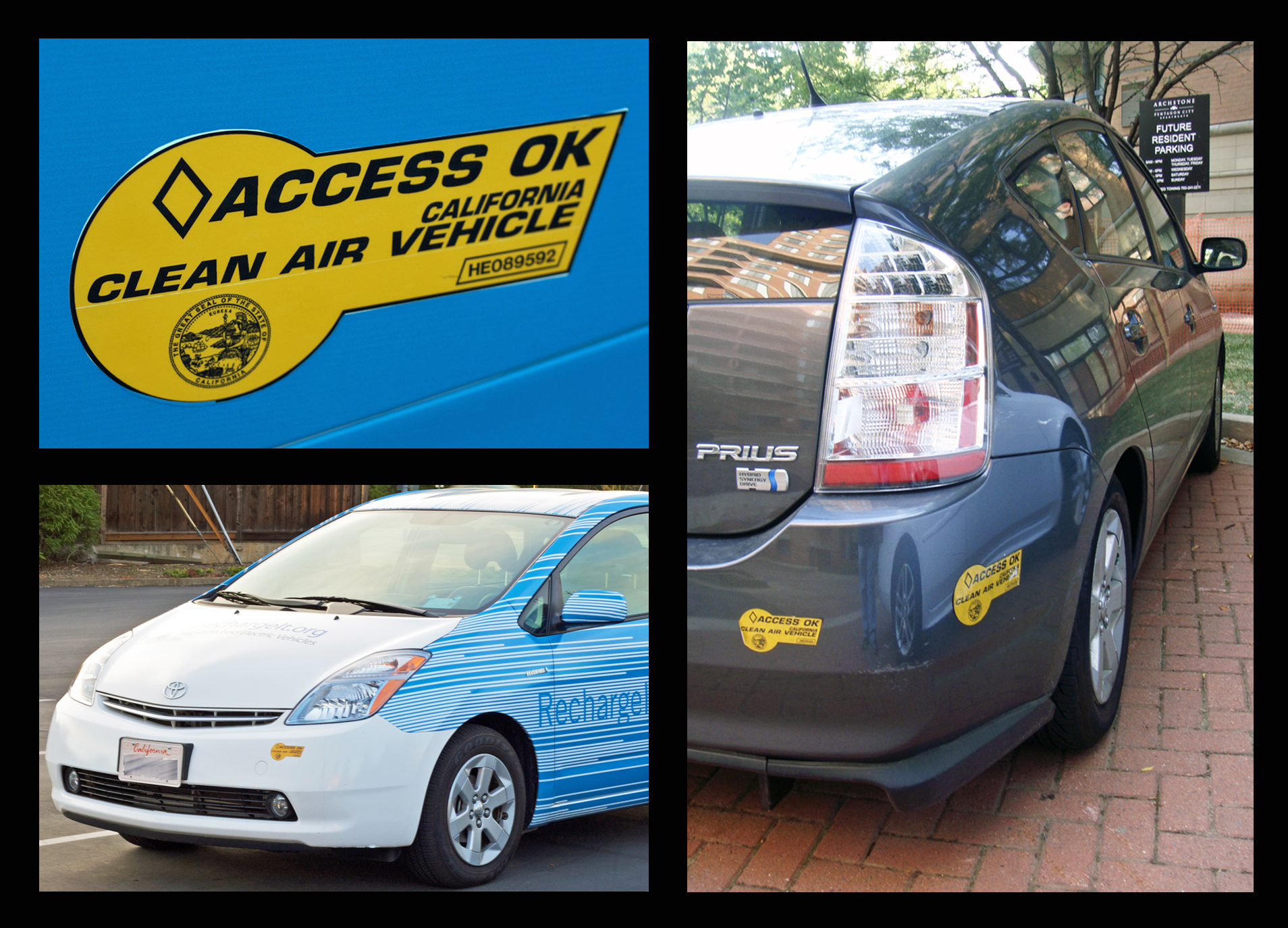
California's clean air bumper sticker used to allow HEVs to access HOV lanes. Shown a RechargeIT's plug-in converted Prius (left) and a conventional Toyota Prius (right).

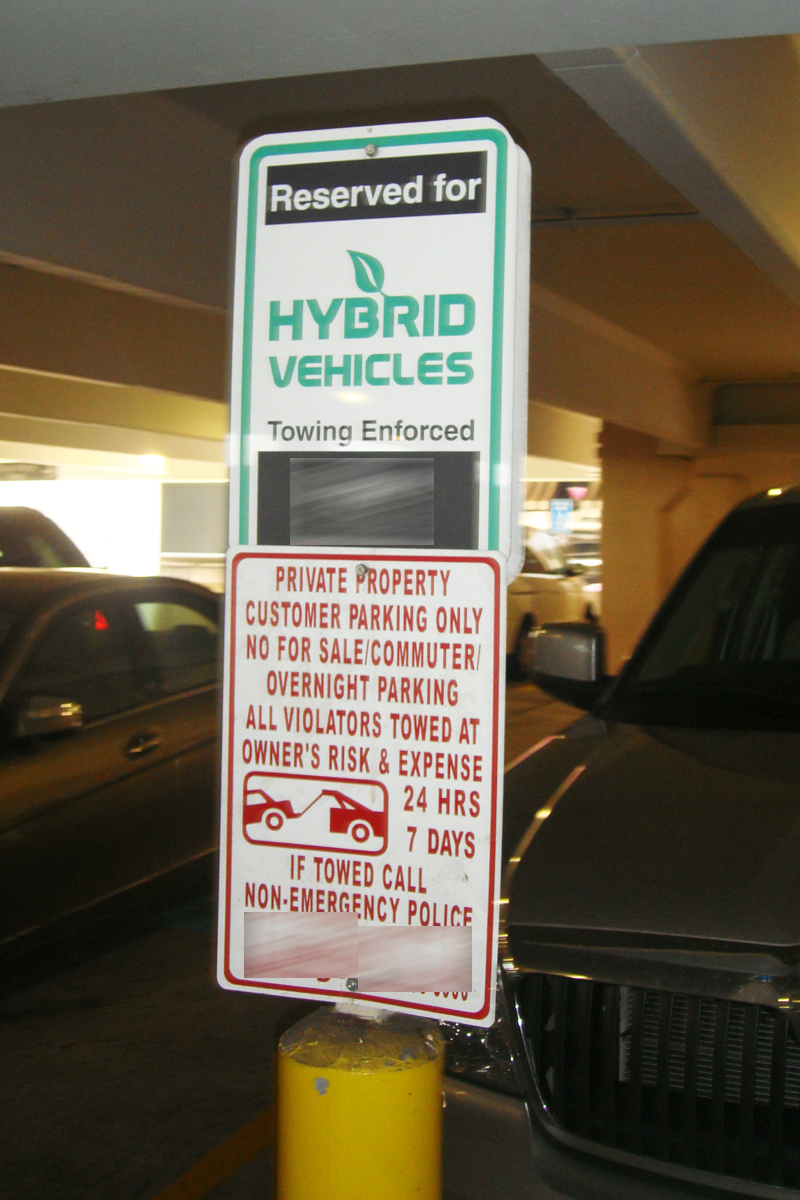
Some shopping malls in Northern Virginia have designated reserved parking spaces for electric hybrid cars.

== See also ==
- Comparison of Toyota hybrids
- Energy Policy Act of 2005
- Global Hybrid Cooperation
- GM Stir-Lec I
- List of hybrid vehicles
- Low-carbon fuel standard
- Plug-in hybrid
- Plug-in electric vehicle
- Extended-range electric vehicle
- Super ultra-low emission vehicle
- Triple-hybrid
- UltraCommuter
