= Honda Insight =

Hybrid electric car by Honda

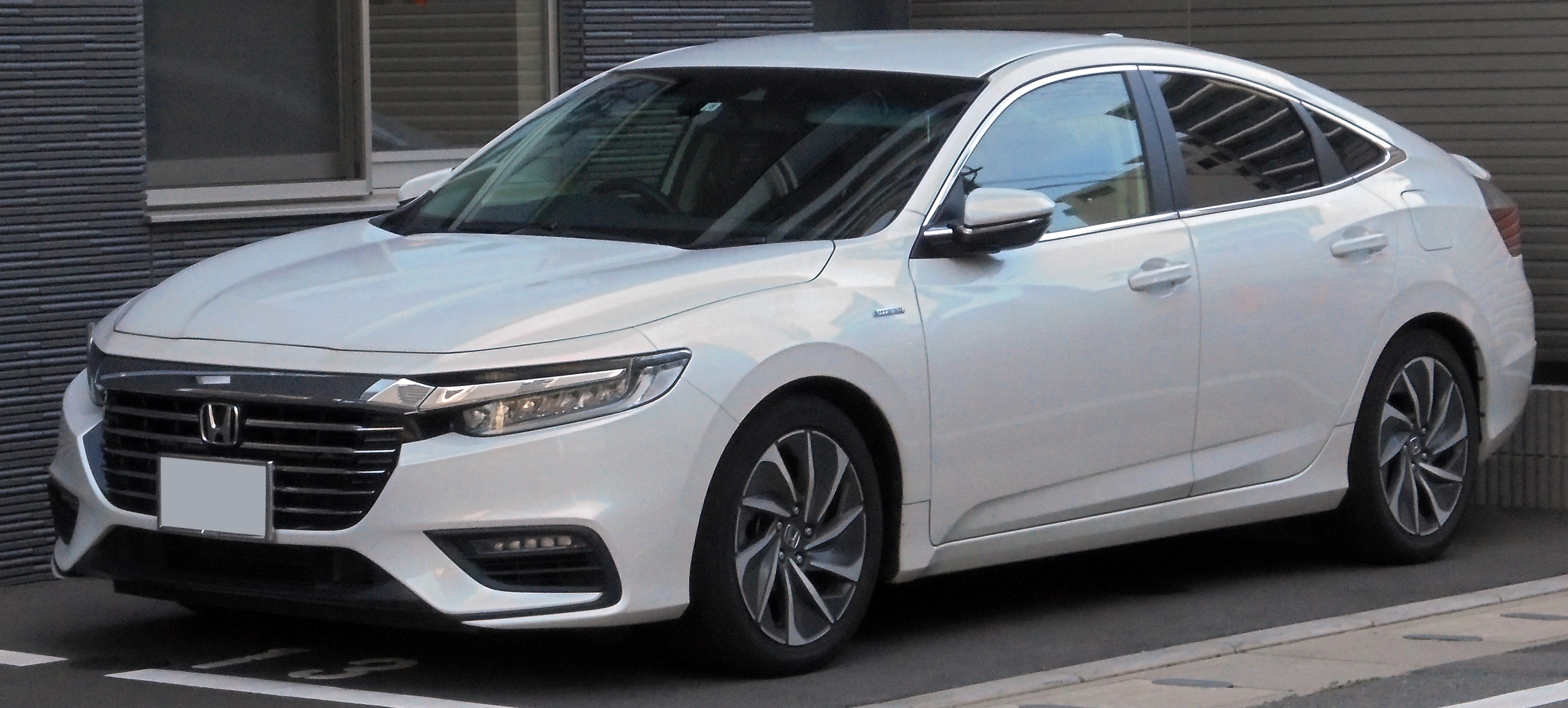
- Honda Insight (ZE4; 2019)

Overview
- Manufacturer: Honda
- Production: 1999–2006; 2009–2014; 2018–2022; 2026–present
- Model years: 2000–2006 (North America); 2010–2014 (North America); 2019–2022 (North America)

Body and chassis
- Class: Subcompact car (2000–2006); Compact car (2010–2022); Compact crossover SUV (2026–present)
- Body style: 3-door liftback (2000–2006); 5-door liftback (2010–2014); 4-door sedan (2018–2022); 5-door SUV (2026–present)
- Layout: Front-engine, front-wheel-drive

The Honda Insight (ホンダ・インサイト, Honda Insaito) is a hybrid electric car manufactured and marketed by Honda. Its first generation was a three-door, two-seat liftback coupé (1999–2006) and its second generation was a five-door, five-seat liftback (2009–2014). In its third generation it was a four-door sedan (2018–2022), and in its fourth generation it became a five-door crossover SUV (2026–present). It was Honda's first model with Integrated Motor Assist system and the most fuel efficient gasoline-powered car available in the U.S. without plug-in capability for the length of its production run.

Honda introduced the second-generation Insight in Japan in February 2009 and in the United States on March 24, 2009. The Insight was the least expensive hybrid available in the US. In December 2010, Honda introduced a less expensive base model for the 2011 model year. The Insight was launched in April 2009 in the UK as the lowest priced hybrid on the market and became the best selling hybrid for the month.

The Insight ranked as the top-selling vehicle in Japan for the month of April 2009, a first for a hybrid model. During its first twelve months after first available in the Japanese market, the second-generation Insight sold 143,015 units around the world. In July 2014, Honda announced the end of production of the Insight for the 2015 model, together with the Honda FCX Clarity hydrogen fuel-cell car and the Honda Fit EV electric car.

At the 2018 North American International Auto Show, Honda announced the third-generation Honda Insight prototype, based on the tenth-generation Honda Civic sedan. Unlike the previous Insight, it was a traditional sedan, not a five-door liftback. The third-generation Insight went on sale later that year.

In April 2022, Honda announced that the Insight would be discontinued after the 2022 model year, with production ending in June. It was replaced by a new Civic Hybrid.

== First generation (ZE1; 1999) ==
First generation (ZE1)
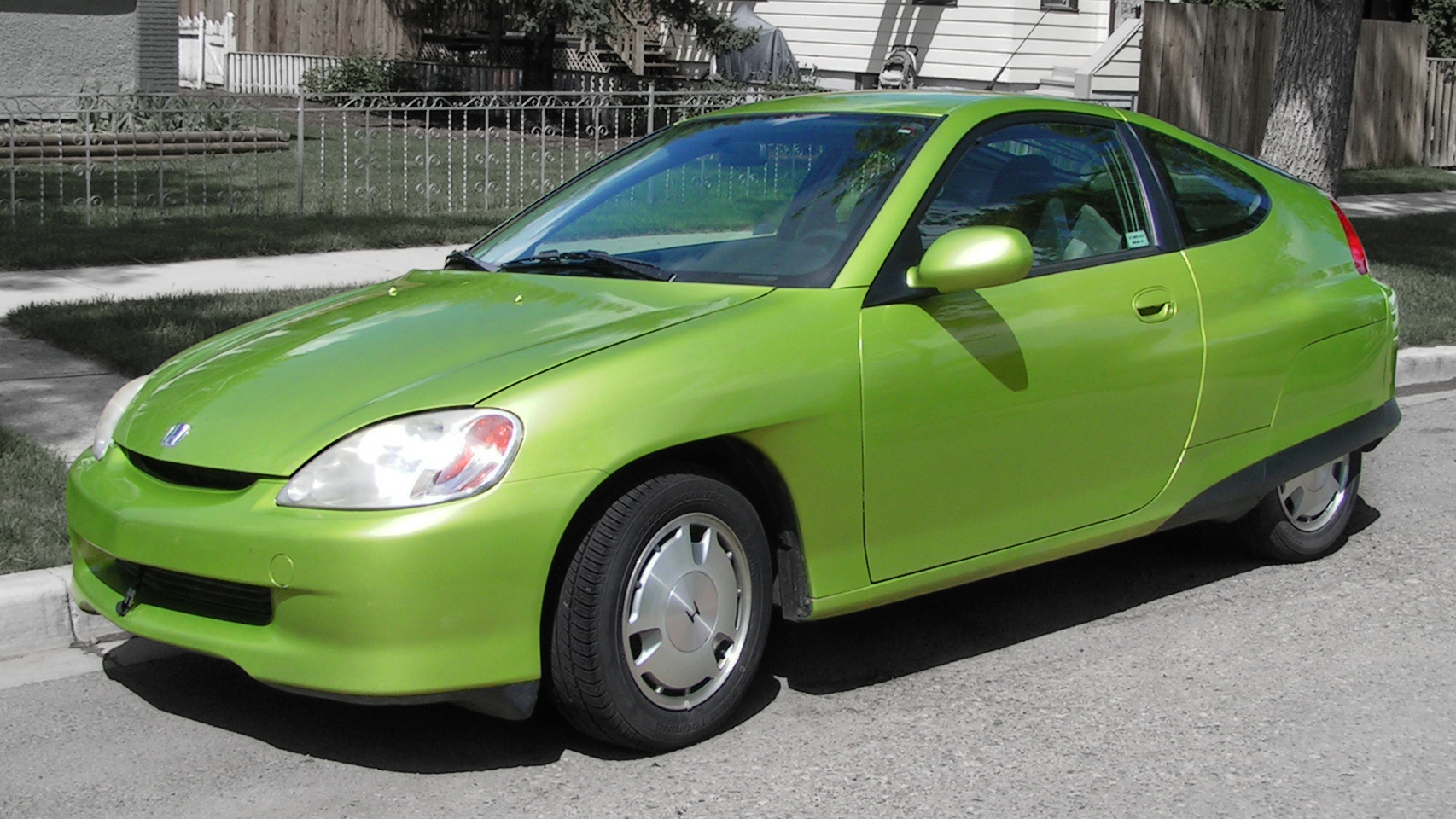

Overview
- Production: November 1999 – September 2006
- Model years: 2000–2006
- Assembly: Japan: Tochigi (1999–2004); Japan: Suzuka, Mie (2004–2006)

Body and chassis
- Class: Subcompact car
- Body style: 3-door liftback

Powertrain
- Engine: 1.0 L ECA1 I3
- Electric motor: 144 V; 10 kW (13 hp) at 3000 rpm; ULEV/SULEV
- Transmission: 5-speed manual; CVT (2001–2006)
- Hybrid drivetrain: Honda Integrated Motor Assist (IMA)
- Battery: 6.5 Ah Ni-MH; 144 V (120 cells @ 1.2V)

Dimensions
- Wheelbase: 2,400 mm (94.5 in)
- Length: 3,945 mm (155.3 in)
- Width: 1,695 mm (66.7 in)
- Height: 1,355 mm (53.3 in)
- Curb weight: Manual w/o AC 838 kg (1,847 lb); Manual w/ AC 852 kg (1,878 lb); CVT w/ AC 891 kg (1,964 lb)

Chronology
- Predecessor: Honda CR-X; Honda EV Plus
- Successor: Honda Insight (second generation); Honda CR-Z

=== History ===
Based on the Honda J-VX concept car unveiled at the 1997 Tokyo Motor Show, the Insight was introduced in Japan in November 1999 as the first production vehicle to feature Honda's Integrated Motor Assist system. In the following month, December 1999, the Insight became the first hybrid available in North America, followed seven months later by the Toyota Prius.

The Insight featured optimized aerodynamics and a lightweight aluminum structure to maximize fuel efficiency and minimize emissions. Until 2015, the first generation Insight ranks as the most fuel-efficient United States Environmental Protection Agency (EPA) certified gasoline-fueled vehicle, with a highway rating of 61 miles per US gallon (3.9 L/100 km; 73 mpg_{‑imp}) and combined city/highway rating of 53 miles per US gallon (4.4 L/100 km; 64 mpg_{‑imp}).

=== Design ===
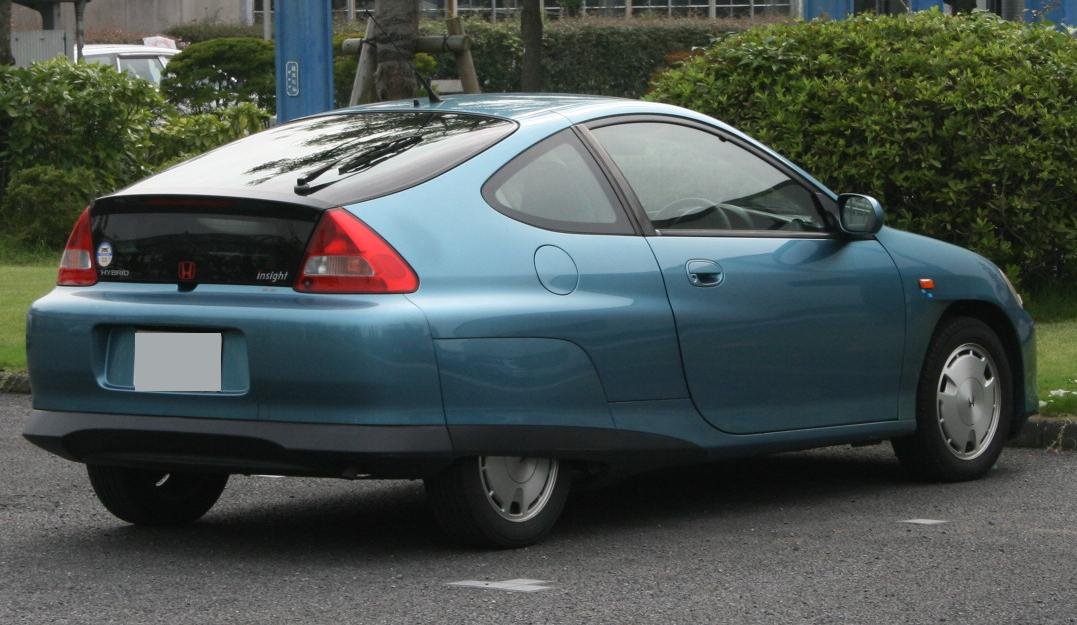
Honda Insight rear

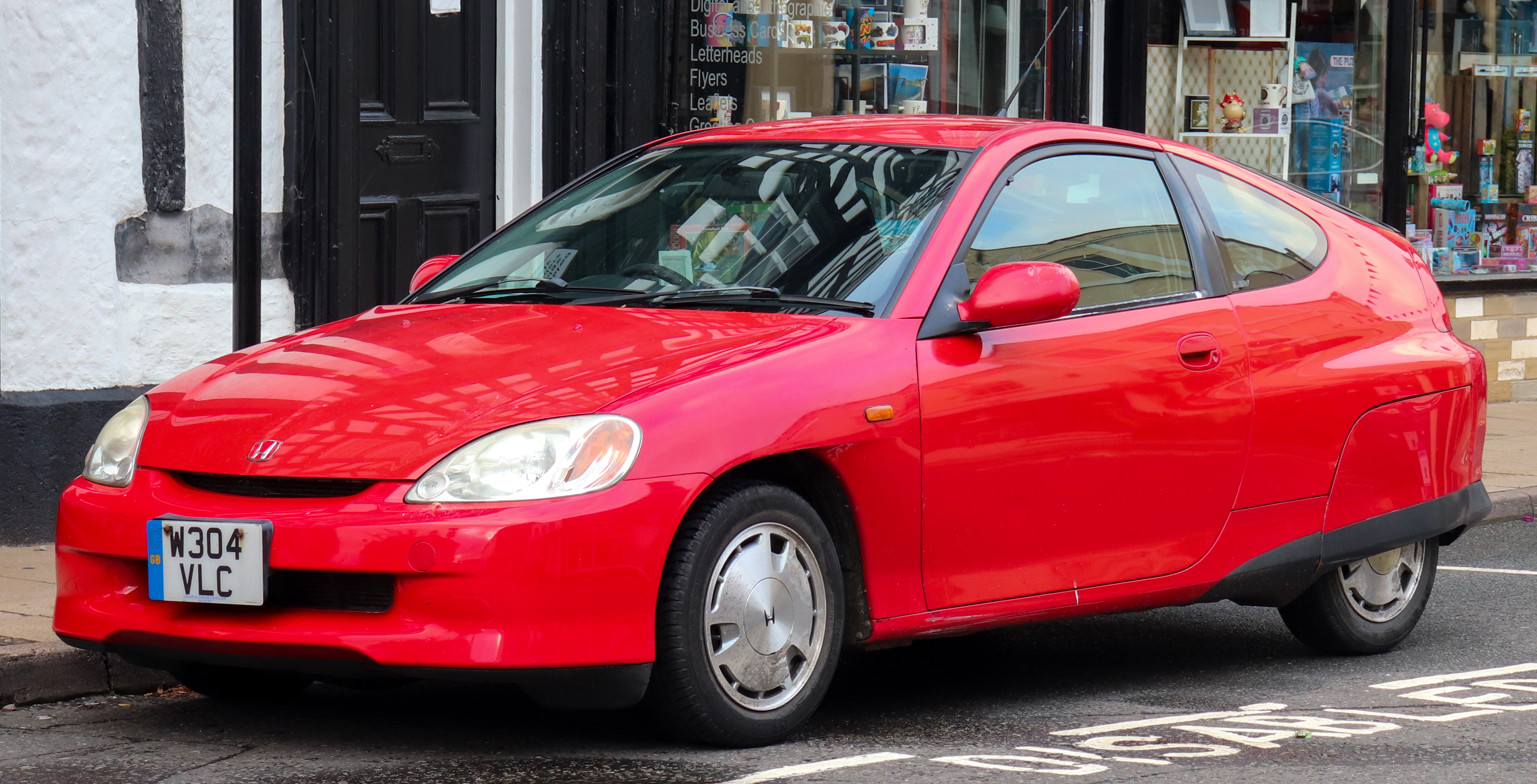
2000 Honda Insight

The Honda Insight is a subcompact 2-seater liftback 3,945 mm (155.3 in) in length with a wheelbase of 2,400 mm (94.5 in) a height of 1,355 mm (53.3 in) and a width of 1,695 mm (66.7 in). The first-generation Insight was manufactured as a two-seater, launching in a single trim level with a manual transmission and optional air conditioning. In the second year of production two trim levels were available: manual transmission with air conditioning, and continuously variable transmission (CVT) with air conditioning. The only major change during its life span was the introduction of a trunk-mounted, front-controlled, multiple-disc CD changer.

In addition to its hybrid drive system, the Insight was small, light and streamlined — with a drag-coefficient of 0.25. At the time of production, it was the second most aerodynamic production car to be built, just below the General Motors EV1.

=== Technology ===
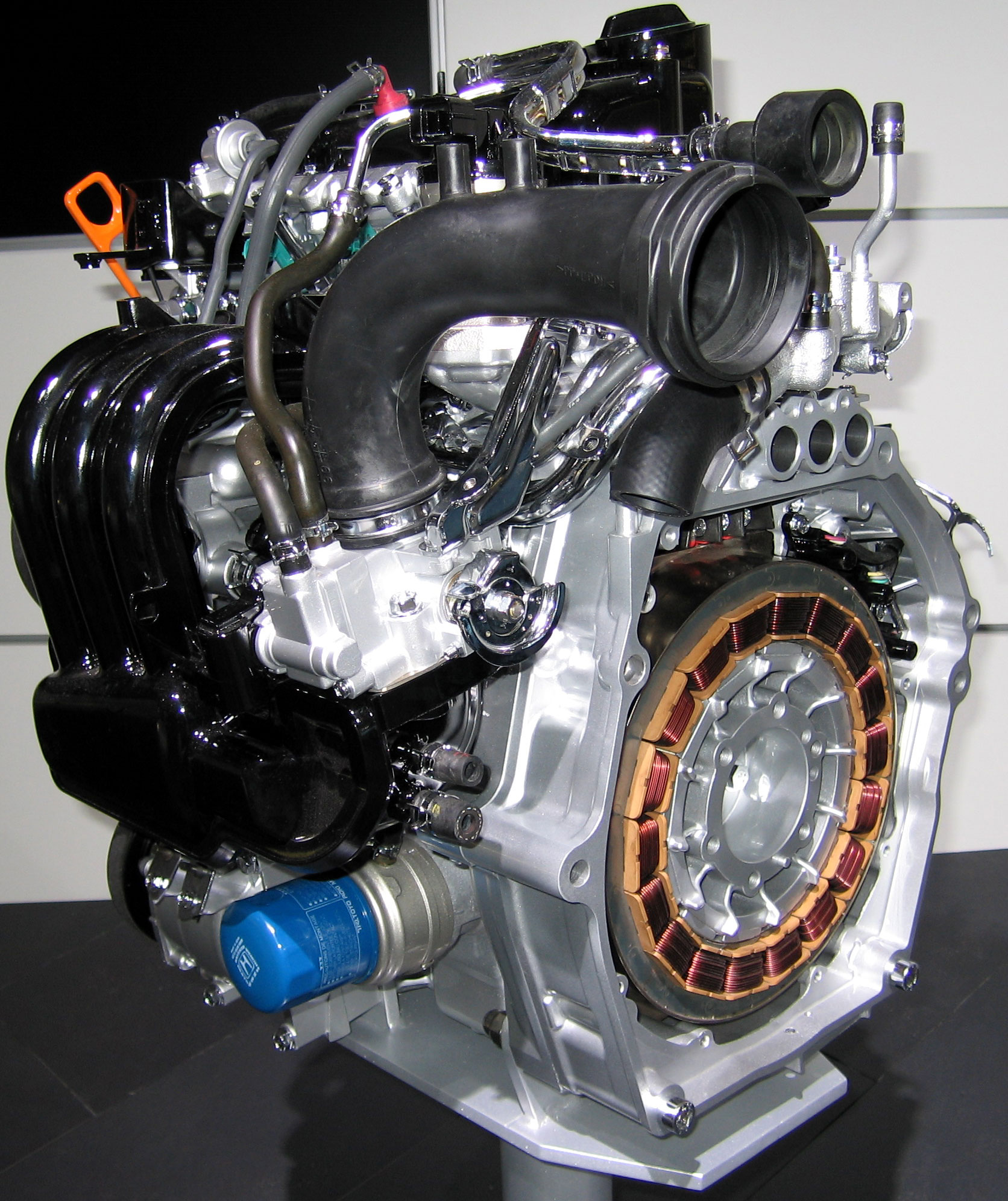
Honda Insight IMA

The gasoline engine is a 67 hp (50 kW; 68 PS), 1.0-liter, ECA series 3-cylinder unit providing lean burn operation with an air-to-fuel ratio that can reach 25.8 to 1. The engine uses lightweight aluminum, magnesium, and plastic to minimize weight. The electrical motor assist adds another 10 kW (13 hp) (at 3000 rpm) and a maximum of 36 pound-feet (49 Nm) of torque when called on, resulting in 73 hp (54 kW; 74 PS) at 5700 rpm and 91 foot-pounds force (123 N⋅m) of torque at 2000 rpm, with the aim to boost performance to the level of a typical 1.5 L gasoline engine. It also acts as a generator during deceleration and braking to recharge the vehicle's batteries, and as the Insight's starter motor. (This improves fuel efficiency and extends the lifetime and fade resistance of the brakes, without adding unsprung weight). When the car is not moving, for example at a stop light, the engine shuts off. Power steering is an electrically-powered hydraulic system, reducing accessory drag when steering assist is not necessary.

The Insight uses the first generation of Honda's Integrated Motor Assist (IMA) hybrid technology. (The next generation, used in the Honda Civic Hybrid, is much more space-efficient.) The Insight's electric assist is an ultrathin 60 mm (about 2.4 inches) brushless 10-kW electric motor located on the crankshaft. Located behind the seats are a series of 120 commercial grade "D" sized 1.2 V NiMH batteries wired to provide a nominal 144 V DC and a capacity of 6.5 AH. During heavy acceleration, the NiMH batteries drive the electric motor, providing additional power; during deceleration, the motor acts as a generator and recharges the batteries using a process called regenerative braking. A computer control module regulates how much power comes from the internal combustion engine, and how much from the electric motor; in the CVT variant, it also finds the optimal gear ratio. The digital displays on the dashboard display fuel consumption instantaneously. On the manual transmission up and down arrows suggest when to shift gears. Dashboard gauges monitor the current battery status, instantaneous fuel consumption, and mode of the electric motor — standby, engine assist or charging the batteries. High pressure (2.6 bars (38 psi) / 2.4 bars (35 psi)), low rolling resistance tires and the use of low viscosity "0W-20" synthetic oil enhance fuel economy.

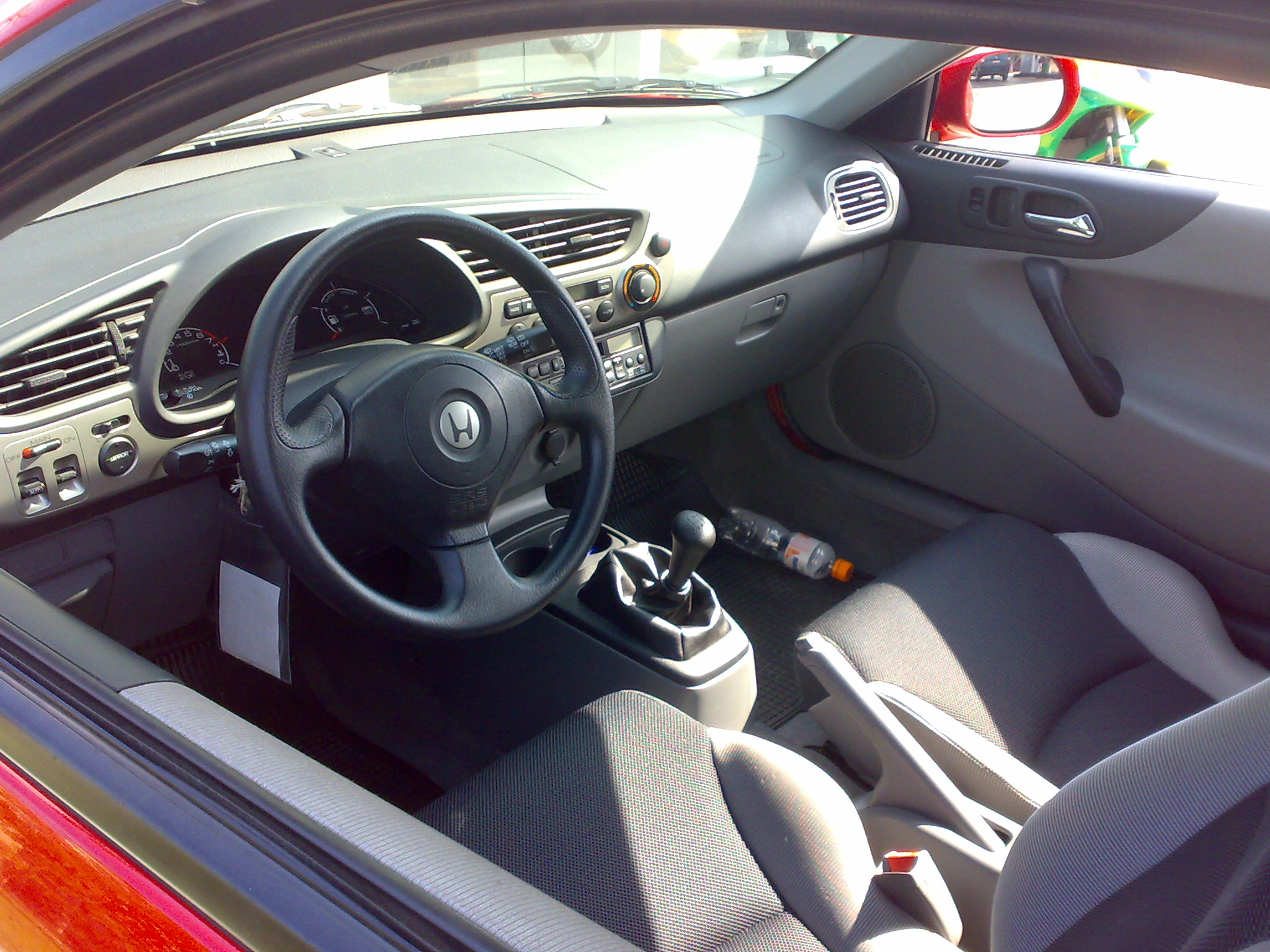
Honda Insight interior

The original Insight had a conventional manual transmission. Starting with the 2001 model, announced in October 2000, a CVT variant of the Insight was made available. The CVT is similar to that used in the Honda Civic Hybrid and the Honda Logo. A traditional transmission shifts between a fixed set of engine-to-wheel ratios; however, a CVT allows for an infinite set of ratios between its lowest gear and its highest. A feature shared by the two hybrids (and now appearing in others) is the ability to automatically turn off the engine when the vehicle is at a stop (and restart it upon movement). Since it is more powerful than most starters of conventional cars, the Insight's electric motor can start the engine nearly instantaneously. The Integrated Motor Assist is run by an "Intelligent Power Unit (IPU)", a desktop computer-sized box. The Intelligent Power Unit, the Power control Unit, the Electronic Control Unit, the vehicle's batteries, DC-to-DC converter and a high-voltage inverter are all located under the cargo floor of the vehicle, behind the seats.

Honda increased the vehicle's fuel efficiency using aluminum and plastic extensively to reduce the vehicle's weight. The basic structure is a new, lightweight aluminum monocoque, reinforced in key areas with aluminum extrusions joined at cast aluminum lugs. Stamped aluminum panels are welded onto this structure to form an extremely light and rigid platform for the drivetrain and suspension. The Insight has a body weight less than half that of the contemporary Civic 3-door, with increased torsional rigidity by 38% and bending rigidity by 13%. Honda built the Insight with aluminum front brake calipers and rear brake drums, and with a largely aluminum suspension, in addition to standard aluminum wheels; reducing the ratio of un-sprung to sprung weight as well as the total weight. The fuel tank is plastic; the engine mounts are aluminum; and the exhaust is a small, thin wall pipe. Its compact spare tire is also aluminum. The Insight weighed 1,847 lb (838 kg) in manual transmission form without air conditioning, 1,878 lb (852 kg) with manual transmission and air conditioning, or 1,964 lb (891 kg) with CVT and air conditioning.

The Insight has a coefficient of drag of 0.25. The absence of a rear seat allows the body to taper just behind the driver and the rear track is 110 mm (approximately 4.3 inches) narrower than the front track.

The CVT-equipped Insight is classified as a super-low emissions vehicle. The Insight features low emissions: the California Air Resources Board gave the 5-speed model a ULEV rating, and the CVT model earned a SULEV rating – the 5-speed model's lean-burn ability traded increased efficiency for slightly higher NOx emissions.

=== Manufacturing ===
The Insight was initially assembled at the Takanezawa factory in Tochigi, Japan before moving, along with the Honda NSX and the Honda S2000, to the Suzuka, Japan factory in 2004. The Insight and the NSX are aluminum-bodied, while the S2000 employs a steel body with aluminum hood.

At the 2003 Tokyo Motor Show, Honda introduced the concept car Honda IMAS, an extremely fuel-efficient and lightweight hybrid car made of aluminum and carbon fiber, which was perceived by most observers to be the future direction where the Insight was heading.

With its aluminum body and frame, the Insight was an expensive car to produce and was never designed for high-volume sales. Instead, it was designed to be a real world test car for hybrid technology and a gauge to new consumer driving habits. With an aerodynamic fuel-saving shape similar to its predecessor, the Honda CR-X, and some unconventional body colors it was a bit more than mainstream car buyers could handle, preferring more conservative styles. Production halted announced in May 2006, with plans announced to replace Insight with a new hybrid car, smaller than the eighth generation Civic, but not earlier than in 2009. Ahead of this announcement, Honda stopped selling Insight in the UK, for example, as early as December 2005.

To fill the market niche void, in 2002 Honda rolled out a hybrid version of the Honda Civic – Honda Civic Hybrid, followed by Toyota's redesign of the Prius in 2003 as a 2004 model.

=== Sales ===
Honda had originally planned to sell 6,500 first generation Insights each year of production, but in the end achieved total global cumulative sales of 17,020 units over 7 years, split geographically as follows:

Region	Start of Sales	Total Sales
Japan	Nov. 1999	2,340
North America	Dec. 1999	14,288
Europe	Mar. 2000	392

=== US market ===
The Insight was the first mass-produced hybrid automobile sold in the United States, achieving 70 miles per US gallon (3.4 L/100 km; 84 mpg_{‑imp}) per its then current United States Environmental Protection Agency (EPA) highway rating. Other hybrids soon followed, with the Toyota Prius arriving in June 2000.

=== Fuel efficiency ===
The first generation Insight was the most fuel efficient gasoline-powered car available in the U.S. without plug-in capability for the length of its production run and up until December 2015, when it was surpassed by the 2016 Toyota Prius Eco. The Insight earned an EPA fuel economy estimate of 70 mpg_{‑US} (3.4 L/100 km; 84 mpg_{‑imp}) in highway driving, 61 mpg_{‑US} (3.9 L/100 km; 73 mpg_{‑imp}) city. With air conditioning it was 68 mpg_{‑US} (3.5 L/100 km; 82 mpg_{‑imp}) and 60 mpg_{‑US} (3.9 L/100 km; 72 mpg_{‑imp}). With a CVT it was 57 mpg_{‑US} (4.1 L/100 km; 68 mpg_{‑imp})/56 mpg_{‑US} (4.2 L/100 km; 67 mpg_{‑imp}).

The EPA changed the way it estimated fuel economy starting with the 2008 model year. The revised fuel economy ratings for the 2000 Insight with manual shift 5-speed under the updated testing are 61 mpg_{‑US} (3.9 L/100 km; 73 mpg_{‑imp}) in highway driving, 49 mpg_{‑US} (4.8 L/100 km; 59 mpg_{‑imp}) city, and 53 mpg_{‑US} (4.4 L/100 km; 64 mpg_{‑imp}) combined city/highway.

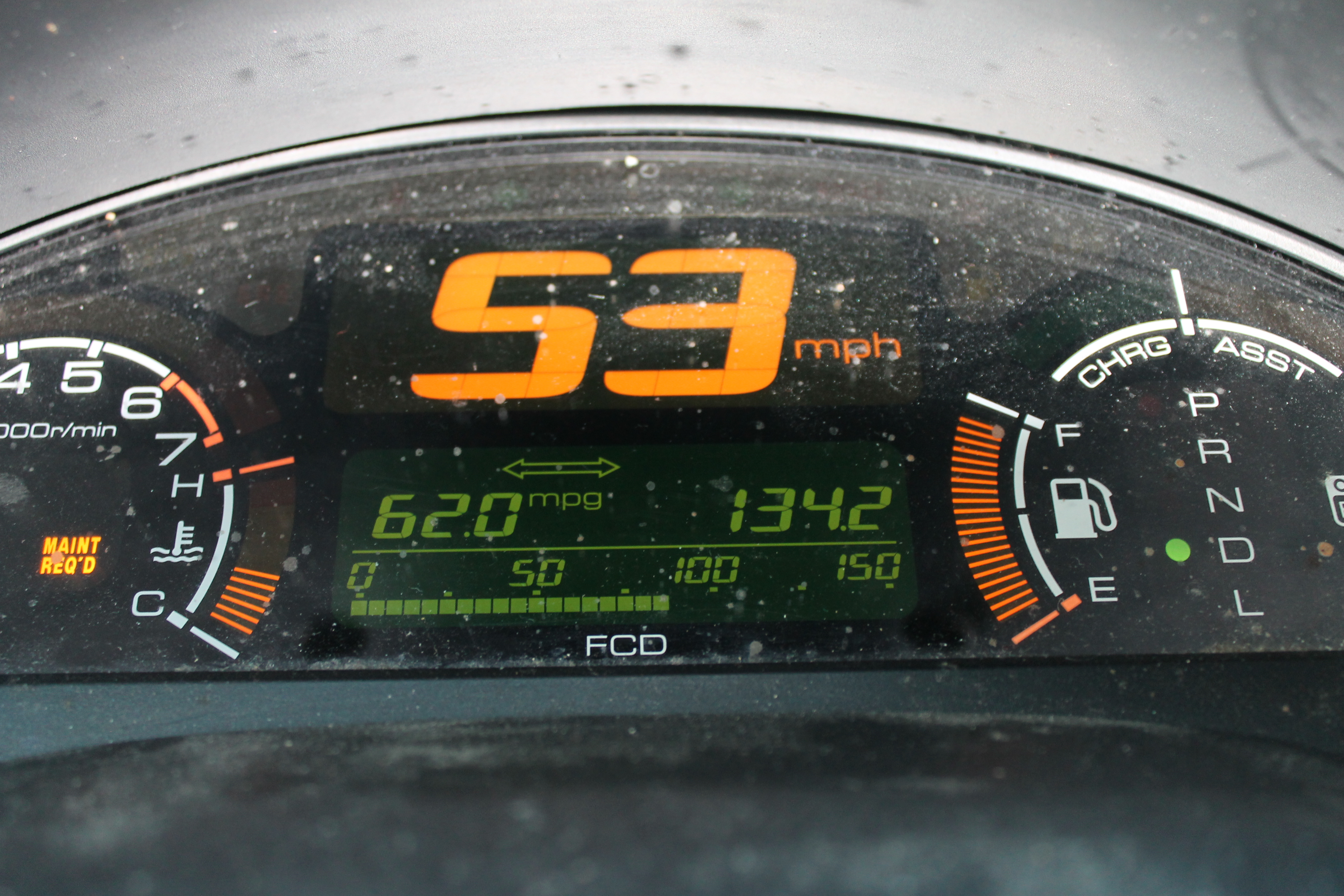
Insight with CVT mileage display

Insight owners who are "hypermilers" compete to achieve maximum travel distance with each refueling. Upon the Insight's release, Honda challenged several automotive magazines to a competition to see who could obtain the best fuel efficiency on the 195-mile (314 km) drive from Columbus, Ohio to Detroit. The contest was won by Car and Driver magazine, which rigged a box behind a Ford Excursion, and had the Insight drive within the confines of the box. With much less wind resistance, the Insight made the trip with a fuel consumption of 121.7 miles per US gallon (1.933 L/100 km; 146.2 mpg_{‑imp}), while averaging 58 miles per hour (93 km/h). A two-year test of an Insight with air conditioning, driven 40,000 miles (64,000 km), averaged 48 miles per US gallon (4.9 L/100 km; 58 mpg_{‑imp}). The New York Times noted that "[if] you drive the car badly, you will get bad mileage."

In the EU fuel economy tests, the Insight achieved a combined efficiency figure 69.2 mpg_{‑US} (3.40 L/100 km; 83.1 mpg_{‑imp}) with an Extra-Urban figure of 78.4 mpg_{‑US} (3.00 L/100 km; 94.2 mpg_{‑imp}) and Urban figure of 57.4 mpg_{‑US} (4.10 L/100 km; 68.9 mpg_{‑imp}).) This remains unbeaten in the UK market for a gasoline car. The Insight has an official CO_{2} emissions figure of 80 g/km which is still the lowest of any UK market car. It was also the only car to fall into the VED band A (up to 100g/km CO_{2}), introduced in 2005, until 2008 when other manufacturers started developing cars to benefit from the tax free status.

=== Usage incentives ===
Under the Energy Policy Act of 2005 in the United States, the Honda Insight was eligible for a US$1,450 tax credit.

Cars registered in the UK after 2001 qualified for free road tax because of their low CO_{2} emissions (2000 registered cars would be taxed on the lower rate of the old system based on engine size). As a hybrid, the Insight did also qualify for an exemption from the London Congestion Charge. However, in December 2010 this changed such that hybrids no longer gained automatic exception, instead cars emitting less than 100g/km CO_{2} and meeting the January 2005 Euro 4 emissions standard. The Insight being homologated as a 2000 vehicle, and hence not Euro 4 compliant, meant it no longer meets the criteria.

=== Motorsport ===
A Honda Insight won five races and the Class A championship in the Formula 1000 Rally in the United Kingdom in 2006. In 2011, the Insight was asked to step down from the Formula 1000 Rally Championship after dominating the first three rallies, it went on to compete and win the hybrid electric vehicle class of the RAC Future Car Challenge from Brighton to London by consuming just 2.9 L/100 km (97 mpg_{‑imp}; 81 mpg_{‑US}).

=== Replacement battery pack ===
As of June 2008 in the U.S., according to Honda, there are fewer than 200 battery failures beyond warranty coverage out of more than 100,000 hybrids sold.

As of 1 June 2008, the replacement battery costs US$1,968 and installation is around US$900.

By 2010, multiple aftermarket large capacity replacement NiMH battery packs were offered, including GreenTec Auto, YABO Power, BumbleBee Batteries and Hybrid ReVolt, among others.

=== Safety ===
Rated by the NHTSA (National Highway Traffic Safety Administration) in 2001

2001 Honda Insight
Frontal Crash Driver Side	4/5 stars
Frontal Crash Passenger Side	4/5 stars
Side Barrier Driver Side	4/5 stars

== Second generation (ZE2/ZE3; 2009) ==
Second generation (ZE2/ZE3)
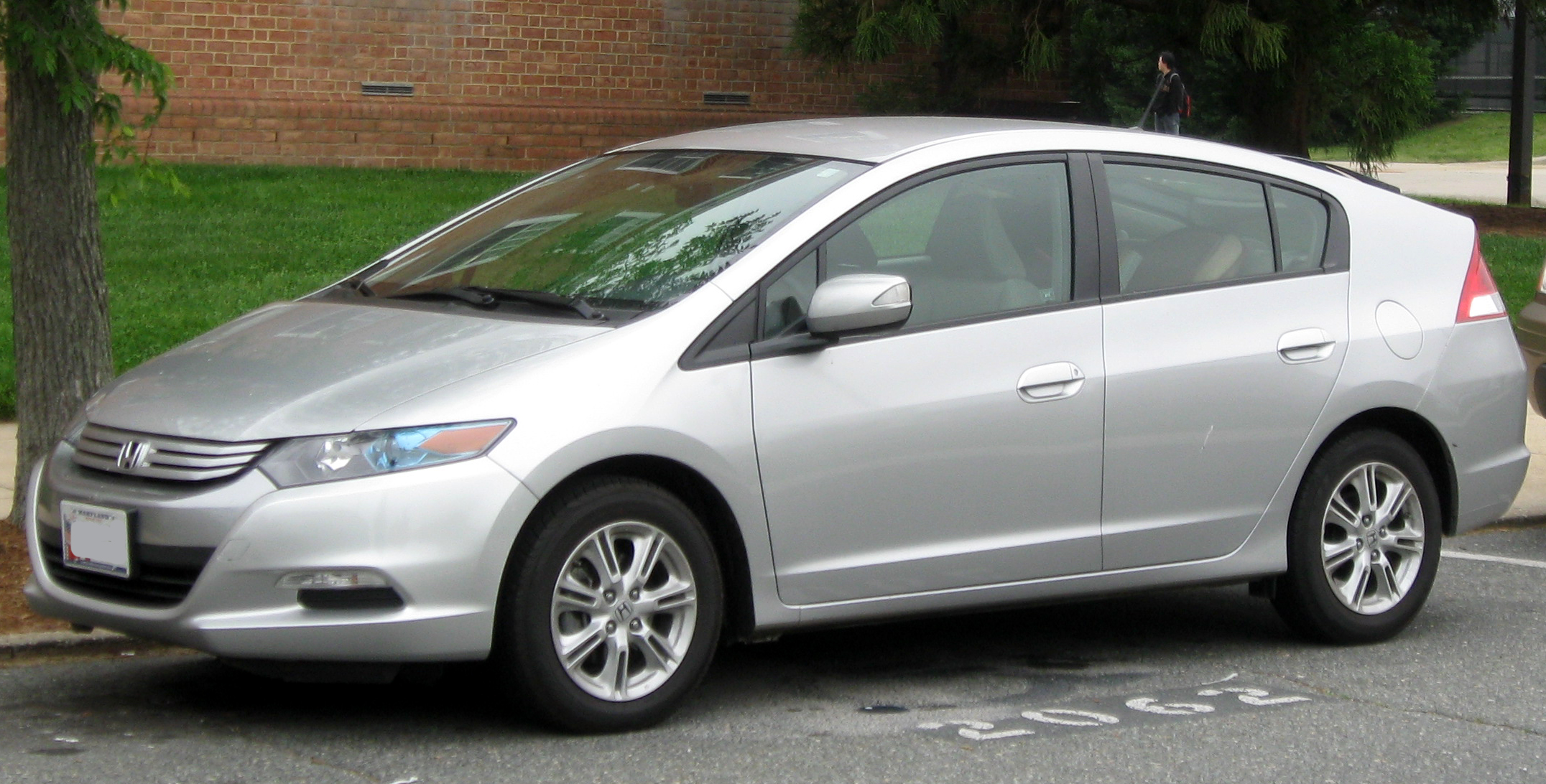

Overview
- Also called: Honda Insight Hybrid
- Production: 2009–2014
- Model years: 2010–2014
- Assembly: Japan: Suzuka, Mie
- Designer: Tetsuji Morikawa

Body and chassis
- Class: Compact car
- Body style: 5-door liftback
- Related: Honda Fit/Jazz (2nd gen.); Honda City (5th gen.); Honda CR-Z; Honda Freed (1st gen.)

Powertrain
- Engine: 1.3 L LDA-MF3 I4 (gasoline hybrid)
- Electric motor: DC brushless motor 13 hp (9.7 kW) @ 1500 rpm 58 lb⋅ft (79 N⋅m) @ 1000 rpm ULEV/AT-PZEV Insight Exclusive (Japan Only): Gasoline: 1.5 L LEA I4 1,497 cc (91.4 cu in) SOHC 16-valve i-VTEC · (CVT) – 111 hp (83 kW) @ 6000rpm 107 lb⋅ft (145 N⋅m) @ 4800rpm Electric: DC brushless motor – MF6 Model 14 hp (10 kW) @ 1500 rpm 58 lb⋅ft (79 N⋅m) @ 1000 rpm[2]
- Transmission: CVT
- Hybrid drivetrain: Honda Integrated Motor Assist with Eco Assist (IMA)

Dimensions
- Wheelbase: 2,552 mm (100.5 in)
- Length: 4,376–4,390 mm (172.3–172.8 in)
- Width: 1,695 mm (66.7 in)
- Height: 1,425 mm (56.1 in)
- Curb weight: 1,237 kg (2,727 lb)

Chronology
- Predecessor: Honda Fit Aria (Japan)
- Successor: Honda Grace (Japan)

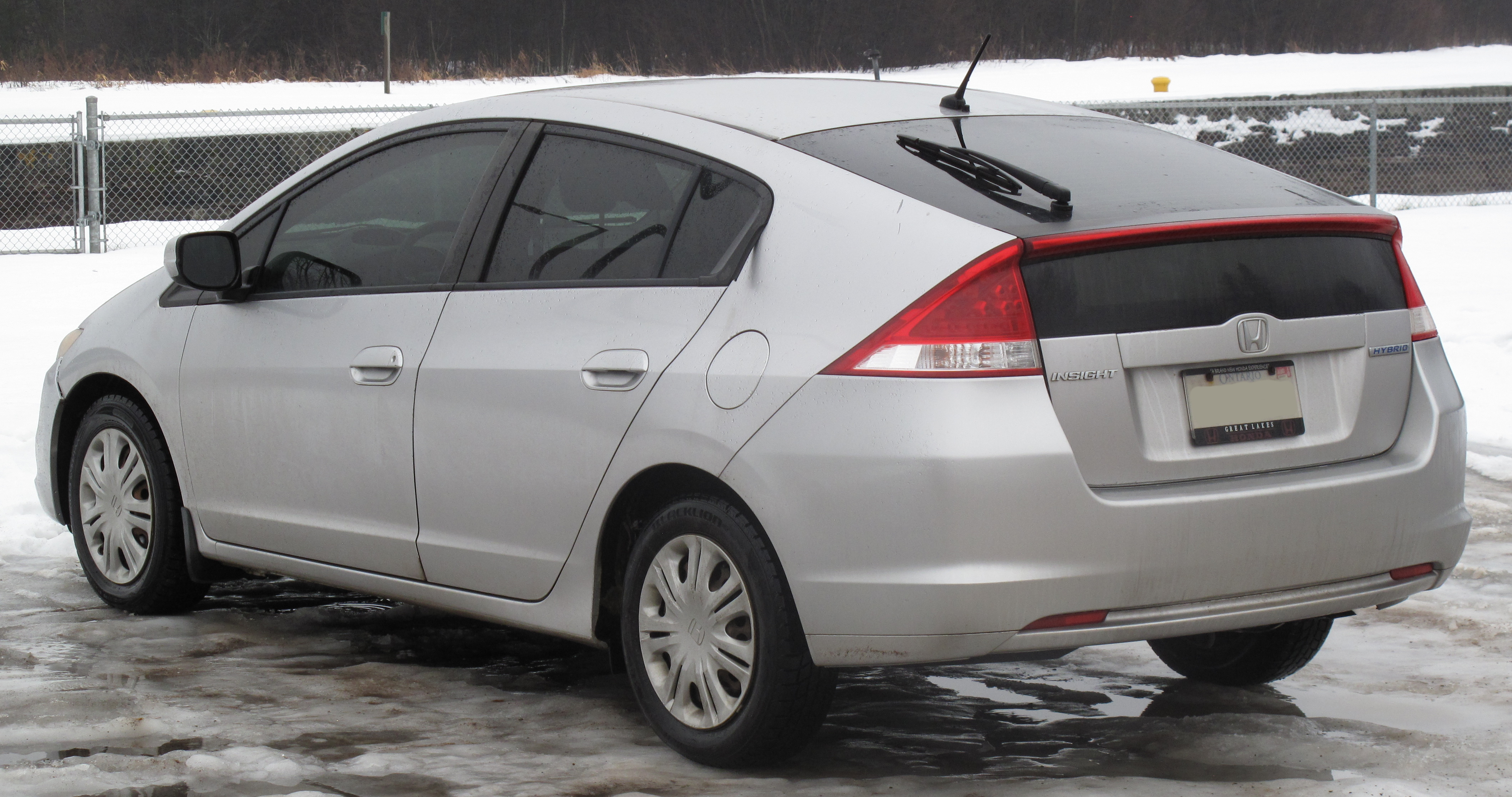
2010 Honda Insight LX (Canada)

In 2009, Honda introduced its second-generation Insight based on an all-new, 5-passenger, 5-door, dedicated hybrid platform, which was also later used for the Honda CR-Z. The concept version of the Insight liftback hybrid electric vehicle had made its public debut at the 2008 Paris Motor Show. and its North American debut at the Los Angeles Auto Show. In the US, the new Insight is classified as a compact car based on its interior volume.

=== History ===
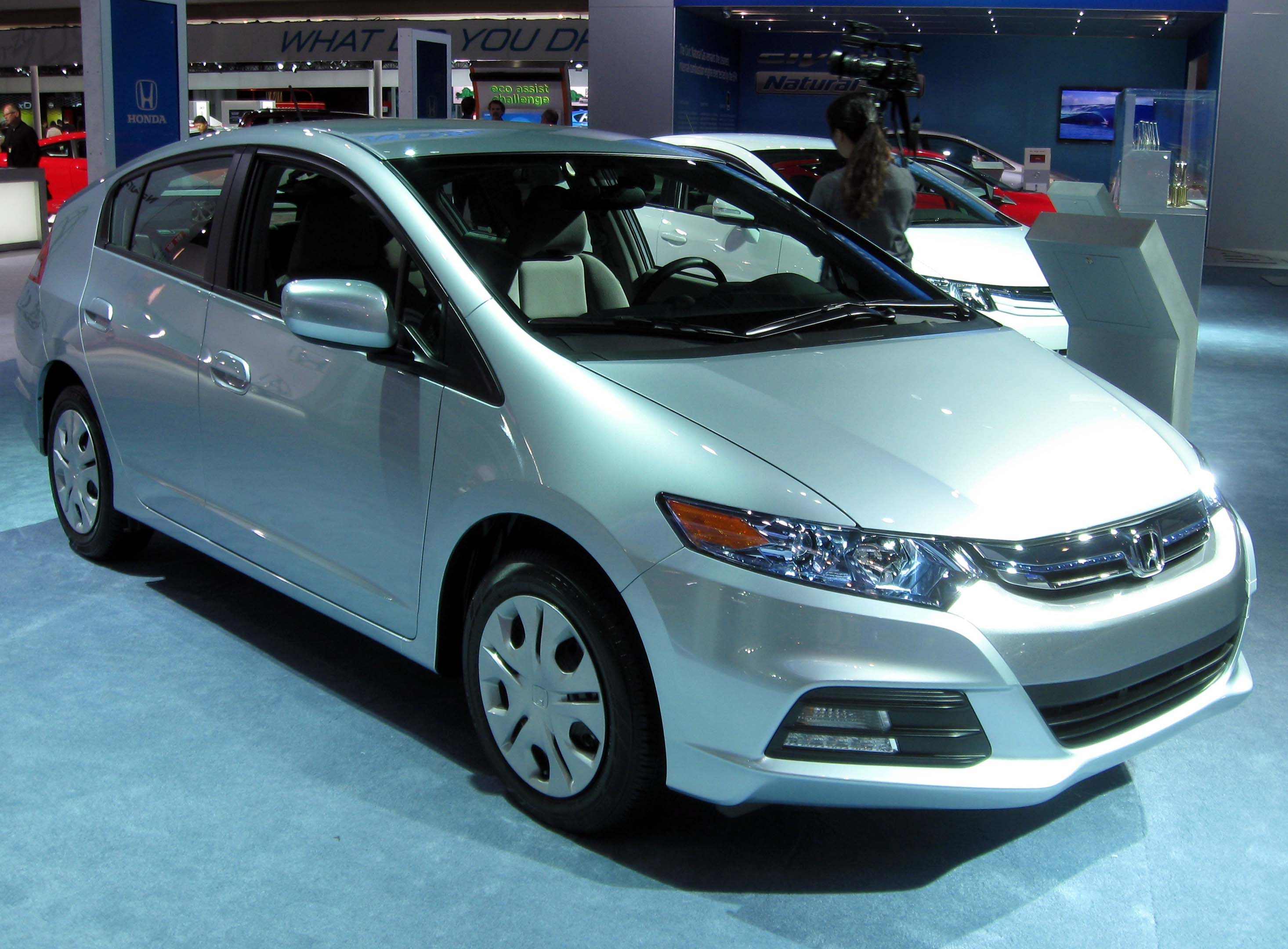
2012 Honda Insight LX (US)

The 2010 Honda Insight was specifically designed to make hybrid technology more affordable to a wide range of buyers. As a result, Toyota cut the price of its third-generation Prius. Despite the Prius still being more expensive than the Insight, the Prius was much more successful in the United States, although the Insight did sell well in Japan. While the Insight had a fuel economy of 41 mpg, the Prius with its more advanced hybrid technology could manage 50 mpg, plus the Prius had more horsepower, seating room and trunk space.

Departing from the first generation Insight's two-seat configuration, the 2010 Insight is a 5-passenger, 5-door dedicated hybrid vehicle that includes the fifth generation of Honda's Integrated Motor Assist (IMA) hybrid powertrain.

The Insight was facelifted in 2010 in the United Kingdom and in 2011 for the 2012 model year in the United States, with updates to the suspension, styling and interior. There are revisions to the recoil rate of the springs, change of the rear camber angles and alterations to the rear suspension brace and adjusting mounts. As a result, Honda promised better ride, handling and stability. Interior changes include revisions to the dashboard, seat fabric, and some plastics. The air vents received a chrome surround and a silver garnish now adorns the door sills.

In 2013, Honda of Japan offered for sale two Insights: base Insight and Insight Exclusive with a CR-Z engine with CVT transmission. The base Insight had the 1.3-liter LDA engine which was offered in 2010 Insight; the 1.5-liter LEA Engine was installed in the Insight Exclusive. The base Insight had the 1.3-liter LDA engine with two trim levels: G and L. The Insight Exclusive had the 1.5-liter LEA engine with two trim Levels: XG and XL. The 2013 Insight Exclusive received revised front bumper, side skirts, revised rear bumper lower valance and 16-inch alloy wheels with 185/55R16 V-rated tires. The XG trim level had 15-inch steel wheels or 15-inch alloy wheels with 185/60R15 H-rated tires. The 2014 Insight Exclusive received two trims levels of XL with level one receives 15-inch alloy wheels and different colors. XL level two receives 16-inch alloy wheels, fog lights, navigation, and different colors. The XG trim level received 15-inch steel wheels and different colors. The 1.5-liter LEA engine is same as the Honda CR-Z with 4 valves per cylinder and has slightly less gas mileage when compared to the 1.3-liter LDA engine.

=== Design ===
Honda chose a 5-door hatchback configuration for the second Insight. The wedge-shaped body assists aerodynamics and reduces drag for improved fuel economy. The 5-passenger accommodations enhance marketability and the overall vehicle shape, as Honda puts it, is “clearly identifiable as a hybrid.”

The wedge shape of the second-generation Insight has been praised by many automotive journalists for its similarities with the more successful and older second-generation Toyota Prius.

The reason we chose a five-door hatchback was that we wanted the car to be popular in Europe. American Honda – the biggest market – asked us to build a car with a boot, but we rejected that idea, because to compete with other green cars and sell more in Europe, it had to be a five-door hatchback. Of course, aerodynamically it is also a more favourable shape.

— Yasunari Seki, Honda Insight Project Leader,

The Insight's exterior design merges design cues from both the first generation Insight (the tapered tail and triangular taillights) and Honda's production hydrogen fuel cell vehicle, the FCX Clarity (the low hood, six-point front grille, and wedge-shaped profile).

The interior of the new Insight includes a variation of the two-tier instrument panel first introduced on the 2006 Honda Civic. In this arrangement, a digital speedometer is mounted high on the instrument panel within the driver's normal line-of-sight for ease of visibility. An analog tachometer, fuel gauge, hybrid assist gauge, and Multi-Information Display are housed in the lower tier.

=== Powertrain ===
The new Insight includes Honda's fifth generation of its Integrated Motor Assist (IMA) hybrid system. This system mates an internal combustion engine with an electric motor mounted directly to the engine's crankshaft between the engine and transmission. Honda states that this configuration is less complex, lower cost, and compact enough to accommodate a wide range of vehicle sizes when compared to competing hybrid powertrains. Honda has used previous generations of this IMA system on all of its production hybrid vehicles including the original Insight, Civic Hybrid, and Accord Hybrid. Advanced development has allowed the Insight's IMA system to be 19 percent smaller and 28 percent lighter than the previous generation IMA used in the existing Civic Hybrid.

The Insight's IMA includes a high-efficiency, lightweight, low-friction 1.3-liter SOHC i-VTEC 4-cylinder engine rated for 98 hp (73 kW) at 5800 rpm and 123 lb⋅ft (167 N⋅m) of torque from 1000 to 1700 rpm. The high torque at low rpm is made possible by the electric motor which contributes up to 13 hp (10 kW) at 1500 rpm and 58 lb⋅ft (79 N⋅m) of torque at 1000 rpm to the powertrain, assisting in acceleration and some steady state cruising situations at low-to-mid vehicle speeds. The motor acts as a generator during braking, steady cruising, gentle deceleration and coasting in order to recharge the IMA battery. The motor also serves as the engine starter, quickly spinning the engine to idle speed after Idle Stop and during normal vehicle starting. The system will automatically switch to a back-up, conventional 12-volt starter to start the engine if the IMA system is disabled or if the car is started at extreme cold temperatures. As an additional safety feature, Honda's hybrid configuration allows the car to operate like a conventional, gasoline-engine vehicle even if the IMA hybrid-electric motor system is completely disabled.

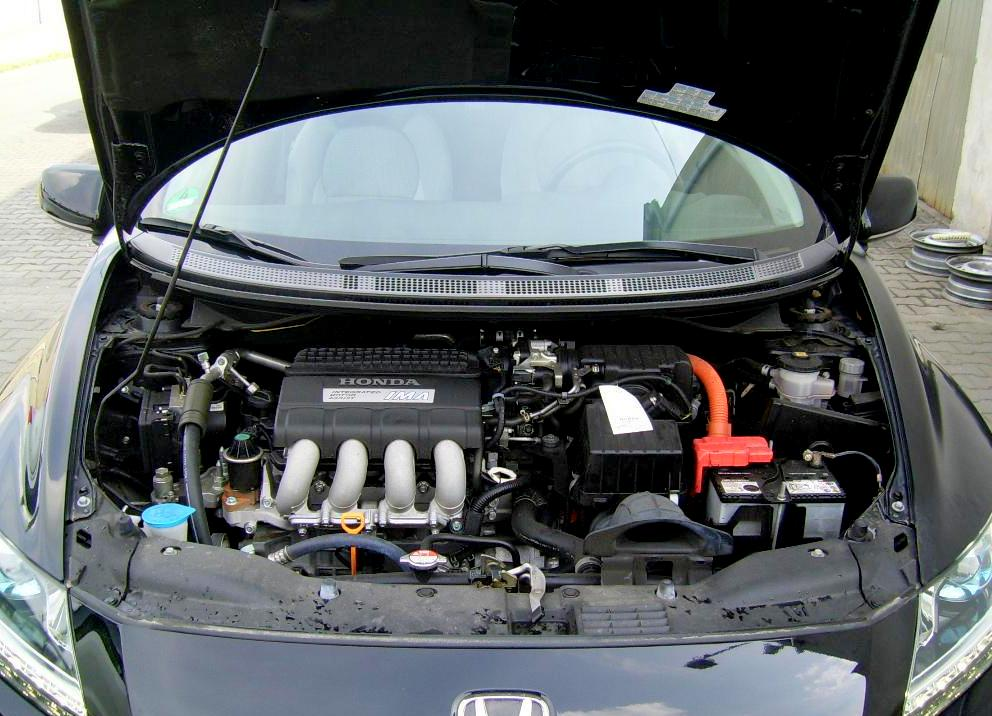
Engine bay of a Honda CR-Z.

The 2013-2014 Honda Exclusive Model Code-ZE3: is powered by a 1.5 L (92 cu in) i-VTEC SOHC inline-4 engine, designated as LEA, with Honda's Integrated Motor Assist (IMA) hybrid-electric system. the continuously variable transmission (CVT) is standard equipment. The system delivers a combined peak output of 121 bhp (90 kW; 123 PS) at 6000 rpm and 128 lb⋅ft (174 N⋅m) at 1000 to 1500 rpm (123 lb⋅ft (167 N⋅m) on CVT-equipped models). The gasoline engine contributes 111 bhp (83 kW; 113 PS) at 6000 rpm and 106 lb⋅ft (144 N⋅m) at 4800 rpm.

The Insight's Continuously Variable Transmission (CVT) provides infinite ratios to keep the engine operating within its most efficient range. Forward gear ratios are infinitely variable between 3.172–0.529 and reverse gear ranges from 4.511~1.693. Final drive is 4.20:1. On Insight EX models, paddle shifters mounted behind the steering wheel allow the driver to engage a manual shift mode and select from seven simulated gear ratios for full control over acceleration and engine braking. Since the CVT's gear ratios are continuously variable the system electronically directs the transmission to up- or downshift into pre-determined ratios when the driver taps the shift paddles. In normal driving, the CVT allows the engine and IMA motor to stay in their most efficient operating range thereby providing superior fuel efficiency to that of a conventional automatic transmission with fixed gear ratios. The CVT's variable gear ratios allow for both quick, initial acceleration and efficient, low-rpm cruising.

In order to allow the powertrain computer to optimize performance under every driving condition, the Insight's accelerator pedal is a “drive-by-wire” type that uses an electronic position sensor instead of the conventional metal cable that usually connects the pedal to the engine's throttle body. In the drive-by-wire system, the engine's throttle body is controlled by the powertrain computer in response to the accelerator pedal position—allowing the computer to determine the optimal throttle body, fuel, and CVT settings based on the accelerator pedal position and its rate of travel.

Car and Driver magazine performed a comparison between the 2010 Honda Insight and the 2010 Toyota Prius. In this test, the Insight achieved 0–60 mph in 10.3 seconds (Prius, 10.0 seconds), the quarter mile in 17.9 seconds at 78 mph (Prius, 17.6 at 79 mph), and 70–0 mph braking in 181 feet (Prius, 182 feet). The Insight's average fuel economy during a 600-mile controlled evaluation was 38 mpg_{‑US} (6.2 L/100 km; 46 mpg_{‑imp}) (Prius, 42 mpg_{‑US} (5.6 L/100 km; 50 mpg_{‑imp})). Overall, Car and Driver selected the Insight as their preferred vehicle due to its "fun-to-drive" qualities including superior handling, steering, braking, and paddle-shifted transmission.

=== IMA battery ===
The Insight's IMA is powered by a flat, nickel-metal hydride battery pack located below the cargo floor between the rear wheels. The 84 module battery is manufactured by Sanyo Electric and provides a nominal system voltage of 100.8 volts with a nominal capacity of 5.75 ampere hours. The power density of the modules is 30 percent greater than in the second generation Civic Hybrid. The battery is recharged automatically by scavenging engine power, when needed, and by regenerative braking when the car is decelerating. The power management electronics, battery modules, and cooling system are all self-contained within the IMA battery pack.

=== Honda ECO ASSIST System ===
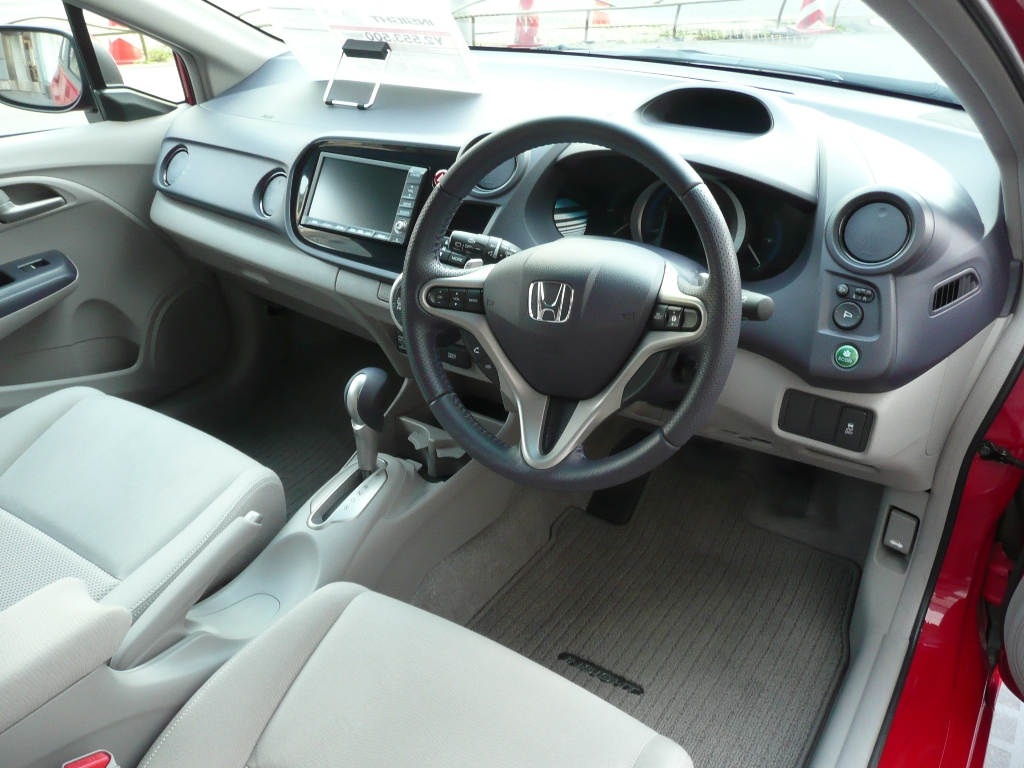
Honda Insight interior

The system monitors and displays the positive or negative effect of a driving style on the vehicle's fuel economy.

As a visual aid, the background of the Insight's digital speedometer glows green when the car is being driven in an efficient manner. Somewhat less-efficient driving makes the meter glow blue-green. Aggressive starts and stops that consume extra fuel make the meter glow blue. By observing the color shift of the speedometer background, the driver receives assistance in developing driving habits that typically enhance fuel economy.

In addition, ECO ASSIST includes a dedicated ECON button that enables the driver to initiate a range of functions that increase the fuel economy of the IMA system via a single button press. In ECON mode, the driver trades off a measure of performance for enhanced fuel economy but gains the following advantages:

- Increases the potential for engaging the Idle Stop feature sooner
- Operates air conditioning more in recirculation mode
- Reduces automatic climate control blower fan speed
- Optimizes throttle angle input and CVT operation
- Limits power and torque by approximately 4 percent (full responsiveness is provided at wide-open-throttle)

Overall, ECO ASSIST is designed to assist the driver in adopting a balanced approach between efficient highway commuting and efficient city driving. However, the EPA found during fuel economy testing that using the ECO ASSIST mode "registered no effect" on its fuel economy rating. "It relaxes throttle response, so the test driver simply compensates with additional throttle to achieve the required speeds."

The multi-information display, located in the center of the tachometer, can be toggled through nine different screens of vehicle information including instantaneous fuel economy, hybrid system schematic, trip computer, and ECO Guide. The ECO Guide display includes a real-time graphic that provides a target zone for acceleration and deceleration in order to achieve maximum fuel economy. When the ignition switch is turned off, a summary screen displays a scoring function that encourages drivers to take an interest in developing fuel-efficient driving habits over the long term. In this manner, drivers can earn additional ‘leaves’ on a plant stem when practicing fuel saving strategies. Long-term fuel efficient driving habits ultimately earn the driver a ‘trophy’ graphic.

=== Chassis, suspension, and steering ===
The Insight's compact chassis is derived from components used in the Honda Fit. The structure of the engine compartment and front section of the chassis is almost identical to the Fit's, but with additional enhancements to aid crash protection. From the firewall aft the platform is unique to Insight.

The most significant difference between the Fit and the Insight platform is the position of the fuel tank. While the Fit locates the fuel tank under the front seats, the Insight positions the fuel tank under the rear seats. This allows the Insight's hybrid battery pack to be located in the cargo floor below the spare tire, to accommodate folding rear seats, lower roofline, and a more aerodynamic body shape.

Front and rear suspension components from the Fit are used including MacPherson struts at the front and an H-shaped torsion beam at the rear to keep the load floor low. Front and rear stabilizer bars are also installed. On EX models, the 175/65-15 low-rolling resistance tires are mounted on lightweight aluminum wheels, each weighing 34 lb (15 kg) together with the tire.

The rack-and-pinion steering uses electric assist and allows the Insight to steer normally even when the engine is shut off in Idle Stop mode.

The braking system includes four-channel ABS, electronic brake distribution, and a creep aid system to prevent the car from rolling on a hill. A brake booster pressure monitoring system monitors vacuum when the engine is shut off during Idle Stop mode. Traction control and vehicle stability assist are also included. The front brakes are single-piston sliding caliper with a one-piece ventilated rotor. Drum brakes are used in the rear.

=== Enhanced efficiency air conditioning system ===
The air conditioning system on the new Insight has an expanded thermodynamic range compared to conventional systems. Unlike the separate low pressure and high pressure refrigerant pipes used in conventional systems, the Insight has its low pressure cold pipe enclosing the high pressure hot refrigerant pipe that allows the cold refrigerant on its way back to the engine bay to cool the warm refrigerant traveling to the cabin. A unique, spiral groove along the outside of the inner pipe increases the surface area and therefore the efficiency of the heat transfer between the outer and inner tubes. This improves the thermal efficiency of the air-conditioning system and, as a result, less effort is required from the compressor, resulting in improved fuel efficiency.

In order to control costs, Honda decided not to include the electric-assist air conditioning compressor used in the Civic Hybrid. The Civic Hybrid's electric-assist allows the air conditioning compressor to continue running (using battery pack power) to maintain cabin temperature when the engine is shut off in Idle Stop mode. Instead, the Insight limits the duration of the Idle Stop mode during air conditioning use and restarts the engine, when needed, to maintain cabin temperature. However, when the Insight's ECON function is engaged, a longer Idle Stop time is invoked for improved fuel efficiency at the expense of rapid cabin cooling. In other words, the air conditioning stops whenever the car stops, as in stop-and-go traffic. During Idle Stop the blower continues to run albeit at a low speed.

=== 2012 facelift ===
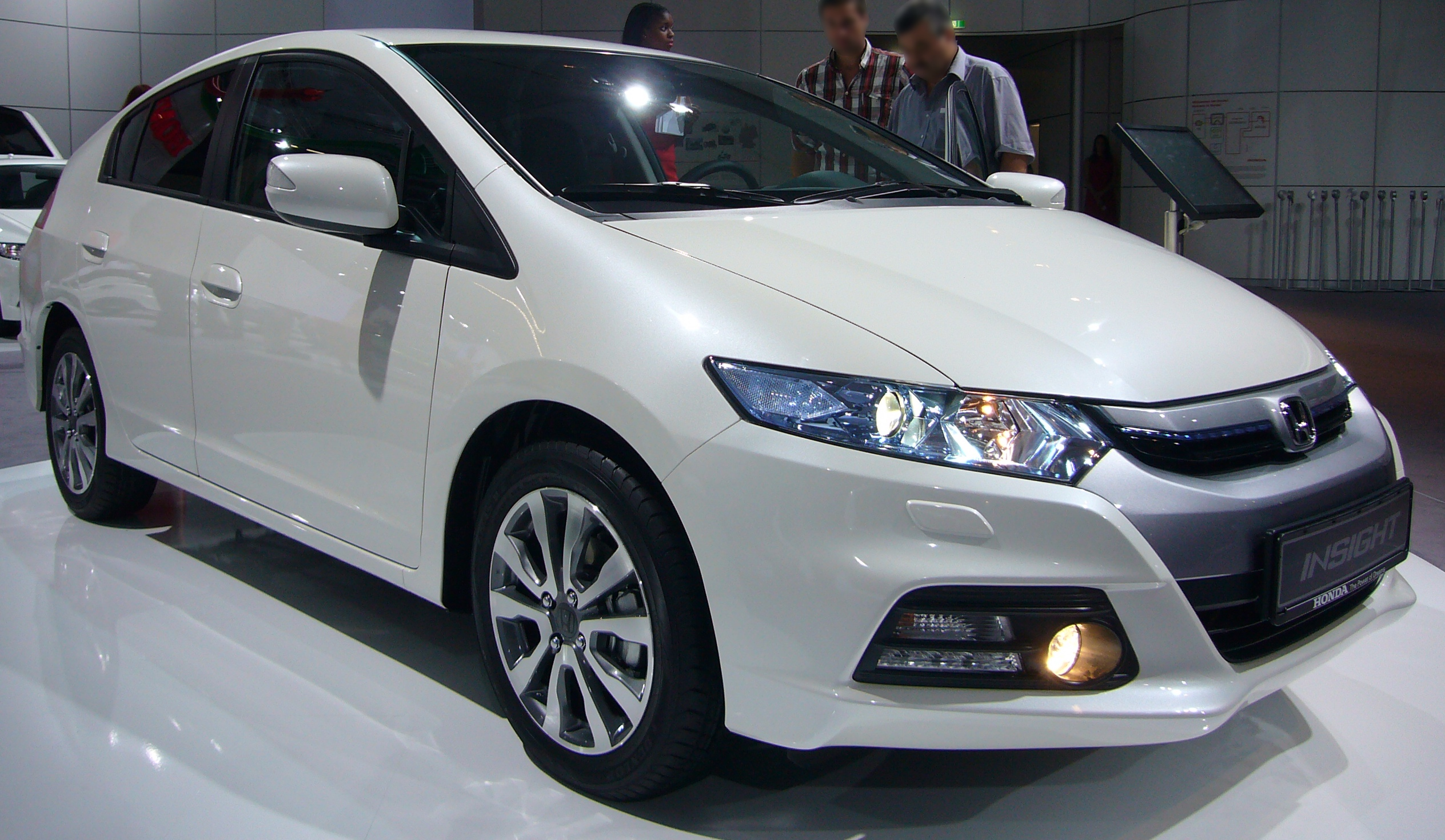
2012 Facelifted Honda Insight

A facelifted Insight for Europe is shown at the 2011 Frankfurt Motor Show. Honda facelifted the Insight for 2012 model year. There are several significant changes to improve the car, including exterior, interior, driving and fuel economy.

In the exterior, Honda updates the front with larger air intakes on the lower front fascia, installs new headlights and tail lights, and has new wheel designs. The new grille comes with a blue stripe that Honda says represents the car's “high-tech hybrid identity.” A thinner rear spoiler and a more compactly mounted rear wiper motor help to improve visibility through the rear window.

Even though it now comes with wider 185/60R15 tires, a reduction in engine and CVT friction, improvements to the front and rear bumpers and underbody lead to a 1-mpg increase in EPA's city, highway, and combined mileage numbers. 41 mpg_{‑US} (5.7 L/100 km; 49 mpg_{‑imp}) in the city, 44 mpg_{‑US} (5.3 L/100 km; 53 mpg_{‑imp}) on the highway, and 43 mpg_{‑US} (5.5 L/100 km; 52 mpg_{‑imp}) mpg combined. The aerodynamic efficiency is improved by two percent.

In the interior, the rear-seat and headliner are redesigned to add more rear legroom and headroom, improving comfort, additional sound insulation is added and the cupholders are larger. A rear camera and a 16-gigabyte flash card system now comes with the navigation system. Furthermore, the gauge cluster is refreshed.

Changes in design led to excessive oil consumption that could require replacement of parts of the engine. Honda addressed the concern in 2016 and, in 2017, extended the warranty to cover these flaws for eight years.

=== Fuel efficiency ===
Despite technological advances, the fuel efficiency of the second-generation Insight was lower than that of the first because of significant increases in size, weight and power. Fuel efficiency rating according to the U.S. EPA testing methodology is: City 40 mpg_{‑US} (5.9 L/100 km; 48 mpg_{‑imp}), Highway 43 mpg_{‑US} (5.5 L/100 km; 52 mpg_{‑imp}), Combined 41 mpg_{‑US} (5.7 L/100 km; 49 mpg_{‑imp}). The 2012 model year U.S. version has minor improvements and its updated EPA fuel economy rating is: City 41 mpg_{‑US} (5.7 L/100 km; 49 mpg_{‑imp}), Highway 44 mpg_{‑US} (5.3 L/100 km; 53 mpg_{‑imp}), Combined 42 mpg_{‑US} (5.6 L/100 km; 50 mpg_{‑imp}).

Honda UK state that the official UK fuel efficiency data for the Insight SE is: Urban 61.4 mpg_{‑imp} (4.60 L/100 km; 51.1 mpg_{‑US}), Extra urban 67.3 mpg_{‑imp} (4.20 L/100 km; 56.0 mpg_{‑US}), Combined 64.2 mpg_{‑imp} (4.40 L/100 km; 53.5 mpg_{‑US}) and the CO_{2} emissions rating is: 101 g/km, putting it in the second lowest UK vehicle excise duty band.

=== Sales and prices by country ===
Honda sold 130,445 Insights worldwide in 2009.

In an interview in early February 2011, a Honda executive disclosed that Honda produced around 200,000 hybrids a year in Japan.

The Insight was removed from Honda Canada's website in November 2013. It was removed from sale in the UK in mid-2014.

==== Japan ====
The new Insight began sales in Japan on February 6, 2009. The reception in Japan exceeded Honda's original forecast of 5,000 monthly sales. This resulted as less availability to overseas markets and Honda has to start production on a second line at its Suzuka factory in mid-June to increase production from 700 units a day. In April 2009, the Honda Insight became the first gasoline-electric hybrid to be the best-selling vehicle in Japan for the month. After less than eleven months on sale, Honda sold 93,283 Insight in Japan in 2009, ranking it the fifth best-selling car for the year. In March 2010, Honda announced that the new Insight broke through 100,000 sales in the Japanese market in just one year after its introduction.

==== United States ====
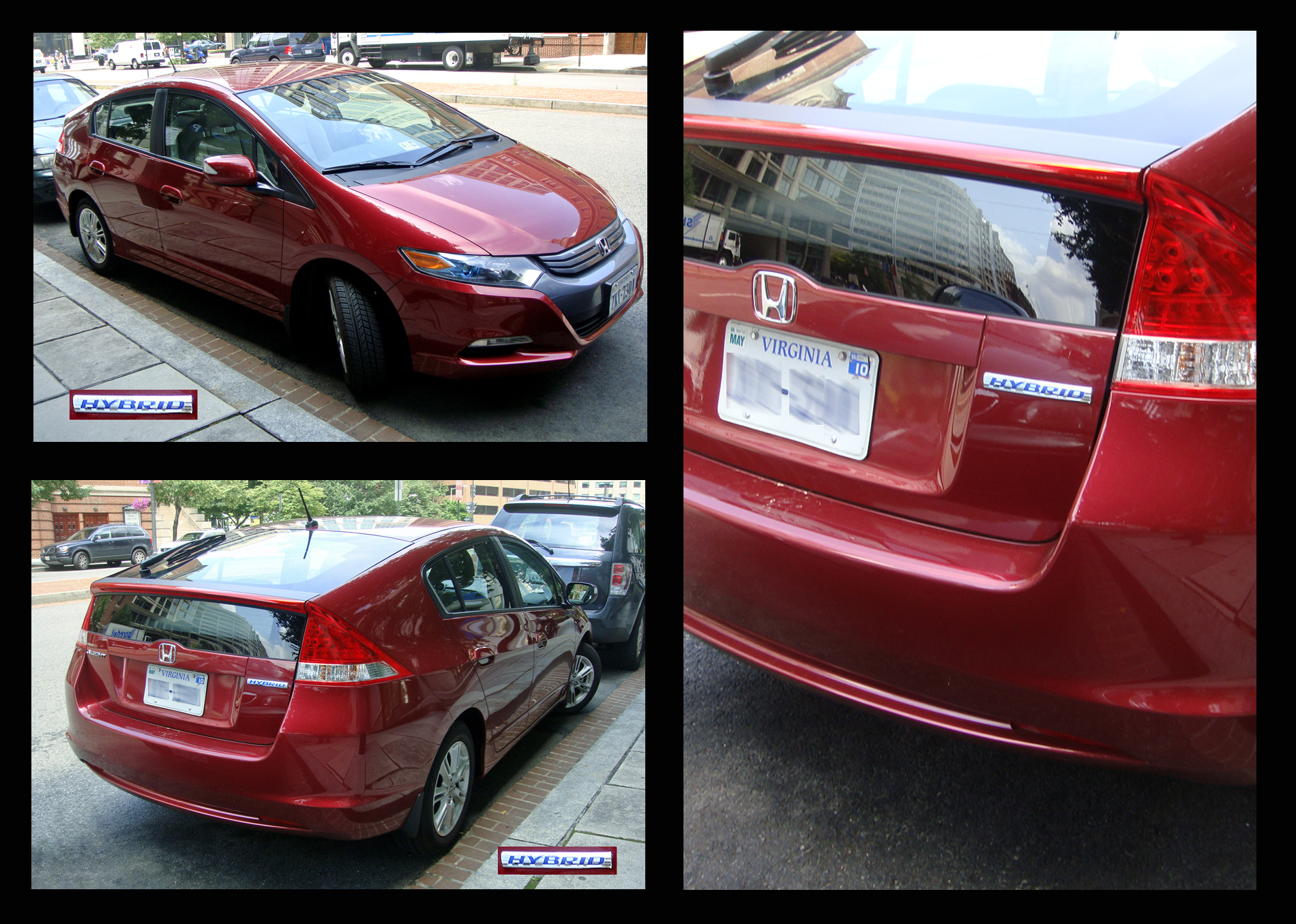
U.S. Honda Insight, shown front, rear, and the hybrid badging.

The car went on sale on March 24, 2009, in the U.S. as a 2010 model, making it the least expensive hybrid vehicle available in the United States.

Within less than ten months from its introduction, Insight total sales for 2009 in the U.S. market were 20,572 units, selling more than the Fusion Hybrid (15,554 units) and the Civic Hybrid (15,119), but behind the Camry Hybrid (22,887 units) and the Toyota Prius (139,682 units). The sales in the U.S. were below expectation, mainly due to the economic recession in 2008–09, stiff competition and a drop in gasoline prices of over one-third over the past year, eroding demand for fuel-efficient cars.

In December 2010, Honda introduced a less expensive Insight hybrid for the 2011 model year to help boost sales. For the 2011 LX model, center armrest, cruise control, USB connectivity for the audio system and floor mats are newly added. Electronic stability control and brake assist became standard across all trim levels. All models come with automatic climate control. Honda explained the move "to make (the vehicle) more affordable for those younger customers who couldn't previously get into a hybrid." In 2009, Toyota promised a lower-priced version of the Prius to compete with Insight, but quietly dropped the deal for consumers.

In 2010, 20,962 Insights were sold in the country. The Insight ranked number two in all hybrid vehicle sales after the Toyota Prius, beating out the Toyota Camry Hybrid and the Ford Fusion Hybrid. From January 2011 to August 2011, cumulative sales of the Insight in the U.S. reached 13,106 units, ranking number two among hybrid sales for 2011 and outsold only by the Prius. By September 2011, cumulative sales reached 13,618 units, falling to the third place, surpassed by the Hyundai Sonata.

For the 2012 model year, upgraded upholstery, map light, and steering-wheel-mounted controls are added to LX trim; Bluetooth, automatic headlights, a premium fabric upholstery, plus a leather-wrapped steering wheel and shift knob are added to EX trim. Rearview camera and a 16-gigabyte flash card system are added to the navigation system.

Calendar Year	American sales
2009	20,572
2010	20,962
2011	15,549
2012	5,846
2013	4,802

In October 2009, Consumer Reports named the Honda Insight the most reliable vehicle as it scored the highest of any vehicles in predicted reliability, according to its annual vehicles reliability survey.

==== Europe ====
Calendar Year	Europe sales
2009	15,416
2010	11,731
2011	5,580
2012	3,282
2013	1,276
2014	536

==== United Kingdom ====
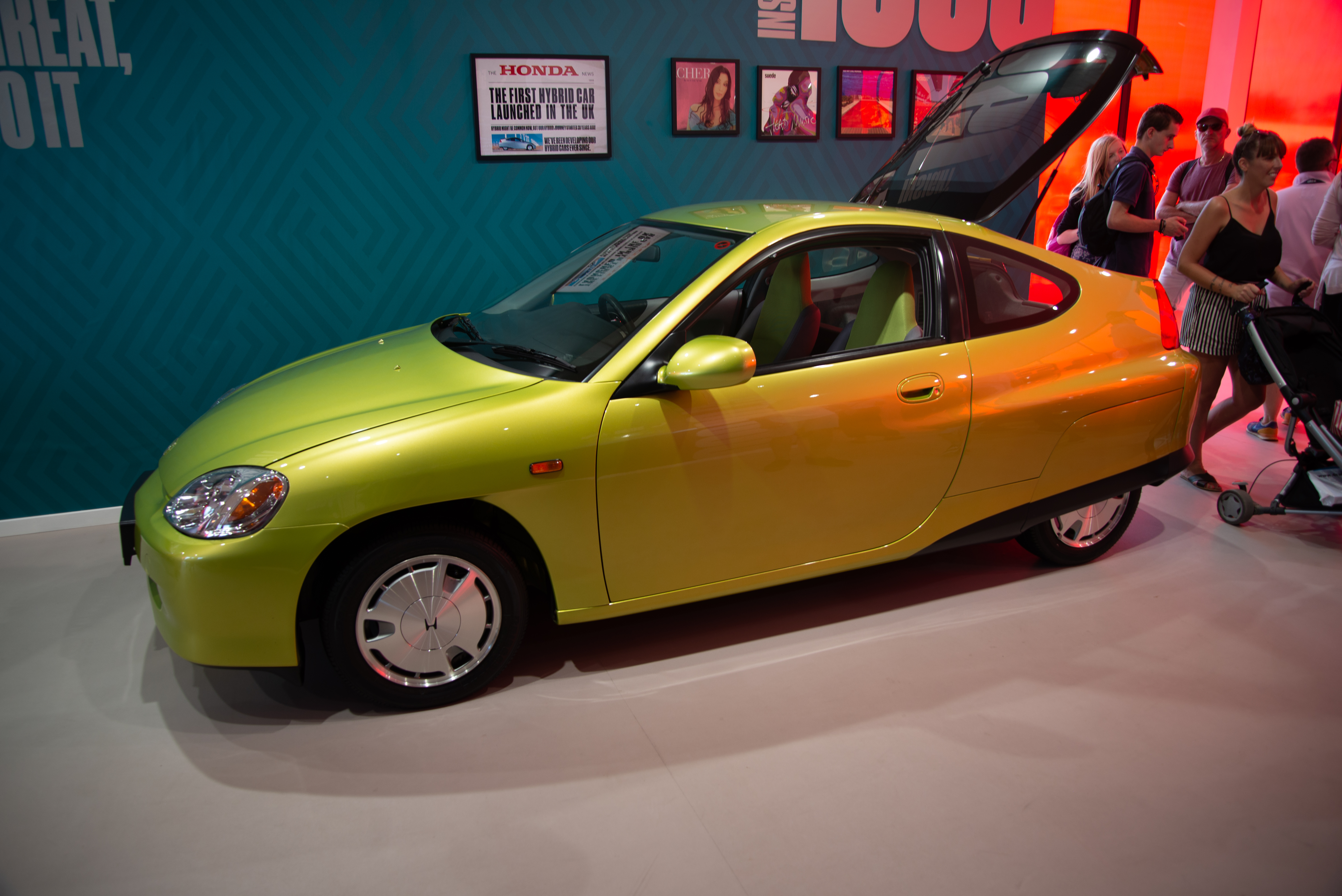
The 1999 Honda Insight is the first hybrid car launched in the UK

The Honda Insight has been on sale from 4 April 2009 and early reports said it outsold its competitor by 15%. The Insight is no longer exempted from the London congestion charge. Starting from autumn 2010, revised suspension should improve ride and handling, parking sensors are added to ES model and higher trim models.

==== Australia ====
The Insight was launched as the lowest-priced hybrid car in Australia starting from December 2010. Its price was lower than the Civic Hybrid and the Toyota Prius.

Its fuel economy is rated 4.6 L/100 km (61 mpg_{‑imp}; 51 mpg_{‑US}) in official Australian testing. Honda questions the green credentials of electric vehicles when electricity is generated from coal-fired power stations, "For Australia, unless you're tapped into a green power source, the benefits are negligible".

==== The Netherlands ====
As of March 2010, Honda has sold 2,661 units since the introduction of the Insight in April 2009 of which 847 were sold in the first three months of 2010. As of January 2010, the Honda Insight is exempt of road tax.

The sales of the Honda Insight, along with those of the Honda Civic Hybrid, helped Honda achieve their best sales result in the Netherlands since 1989.

==== Republic of Ireland ====
Between 2009 and 2015, The Society of the Irish Motor Industry (SIMI) 'Motorstats' (beepbeep.ie) show that there were 306 'Total New Registrations' of Honda Insights (including 27 and 5 in 2014 & 2015 respectively) with a peak of 108 in 2010 (10 in 2009). The 'Refreshed' model (new front etc.) was available in 2013. Retail price in 2014 for the SE option was €23,495 and the ES €24,610 (kevinoleary.ie).

==== Other Asian countries ====
The Insight was launched in South Korea in October 2010 as the lowest priced hybrid car offered by import automakers.

In Malaysia, Honda launched the Insight on December 2, 2010, at the Kuala Lumpur International Motor Show (KLIMS) 2010. It was priced slightly more than the top model Honda City. It is reported that a few hundred sales orders were received even before its launch.

In Singapore, the Honda Insight was sold by the official importer until January 2015.

In 2011, Insight was the best selling hybrid in the country with a total of 4,568 sold.

=== Reception ===
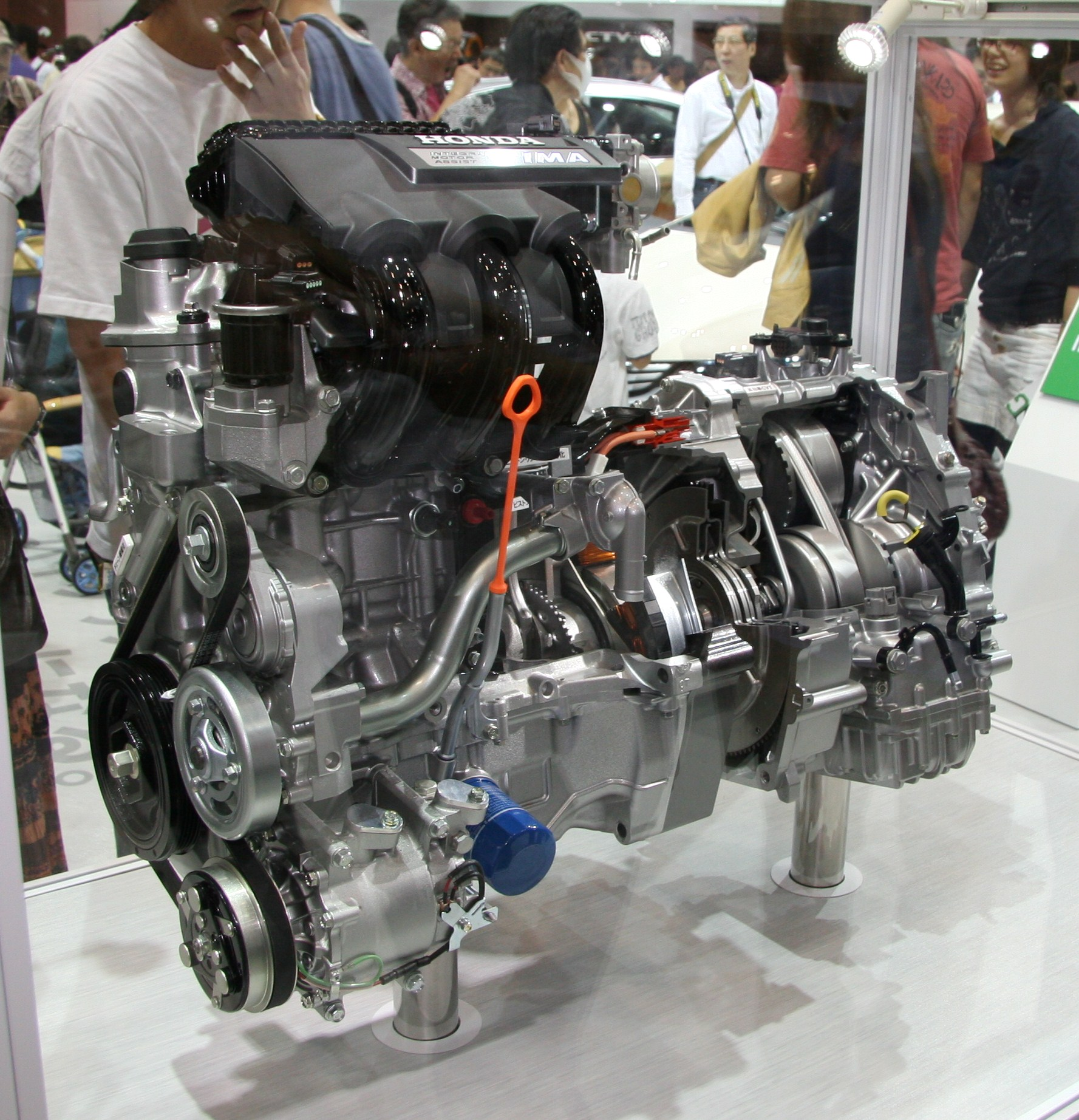
Second generation Honda Insight IMA powertrain – engine, motor and transmission.

Early reviews praised the Insight's futuristic styling, handling, and price but noted that it was less powerful, less fuel efficient, and less comfortable than other more expensive hybrids. The Insight performed well in comparison tests administered by Motor Trend and Car and Driver. In their comparison test against the 2010 Toyota Prius, Car and Driver stated "...the Insight proved more visceral, connected, and agile than the Prius. The Insight represents a lot of engineering bang for the buck, and the majority of its dynamics are more satisfying than the Prius’s" citing the benefits of the Insight's firm brake feel, accurate steering, and tight suspension (the latter borrowing heavily from the latest Honda Fit). It did not perform as well in Edmunds or Popular Mechanics tests. Despite a high reliability rating in Consumer Reports testing, the Insight was assigned a low score, stating that it fell short in ride quality, handling, interior noise, acceleration, refinement, rear seat access and rear visibility.

Autoblog praised it for its fuel economy, tight handling, and good steering feedback, and stated "the Insight is a shockingly fun car to drive in a spirited manner in spite of the comparatively modest thrust available.", but criticized the Insight for its low passenger volume.

Automotive critic Jeremy Clarkson, known for his disdain for hybrid vehicles, criticized the Insight for its continuously variable transmission, engine noise, and build quality. He recognized that the price was low, but concluded that a Volkswagen Golf was a better deal.

Edmunds.com praised the Insight for improving upon the formula of rival Prius and costing thousands less, but criticized it for excessive road noise, a tight back seat, and buzzy engine under hard acceleration. In addition, they state it "is by far the most enjoyable hybrid hatchback to drive" and praised the ride for being firm, the steering for being relatively responsive, and the seamless integration between the electric and internal combustion engine.

In 2009, Edmunds pitted a Honda Insight against other hybrids like Toyota Prius and Ford Fusion hybrid, a Volkswagen Jetta TDI automatic and a MINI Cooper with manual transmission over two days of mixed city and highway driving.

Driving condition	2010 Toyota Prius	2010 Honda Insight	2009 Volkswagen Jetta TDI A6	2010 Ford Fusion Hybrid	2009 MINI Cooper M6
Back roads	47.2	44.1	41.2	39.6	38.5
City loop	48.7	43.4	31.6	35.1	30.1
Highway	47.4	38.6	40.6	36.0	33.3
Overall	47.6	42.3	38.1	37.3	34.5
EPA City/Hwy	51/48	40/43	29/40	41/36	28/37

In October 2014, Top Gear magazine placed the Insight on its list of "The worst cars you can buy right now", describing the car as "A £20k hyper-efficient numbers merchant now surpassed by loads of diesel rivals in practically any measurement except urban quietness. The game has moved on."

=== Safety ===
IIHS scores
Category	Rating
Moderate overlap front	Good
Side impact	Good
Roof	Acceptable
Head restraint & seats	Good

Euro NCAP
Honda Insight (2010)
Overall:	5/5 stars
Adult occupant:	90%
Child occupant:	74%
Pedestrian:	76%
Safety Assist:	86%

ANCAP test results* Honda Insight variant(s) as tested (2010)
Test	Score
Overall	5 /5 stars
Frontal offset	15.54/16
Side impact	15.85/16
Pole	2/2
Seat belt reminders	3/3
Whiplash protection	Not Assessed
Pedestrian protection	Adequate
Electronic stability control	Standard

=== Discontinuation ===
In November 2013, Honda informed dealers in Japan that Insight production would stop. Its sales were in a "slow death" and its discontinuation was for the second time in ten years. On February 28, 2014, Honda officially announced ending production of the second generation Insight after the 2014 model year. With its "unrefined powertrain and cheap interior" the car had "dismal sales" especially when compared to its competition. Although it had a lower base price than the competing hybrid model, the Insight's 42 mpg estimate did not reach the 50 mpg Toyota Prius, the number that "mattered most to potential customers." With a combined fuel economy rating that was now little more than that of some non-hybrid models available in the U.S. marketplace, in early 2014 there was 237 days worth of supply of Insights in contrast to the typical 60-day inventory held by automakers.

== Third generation (ZE4; 2018) ==
Third generation (ZE4)
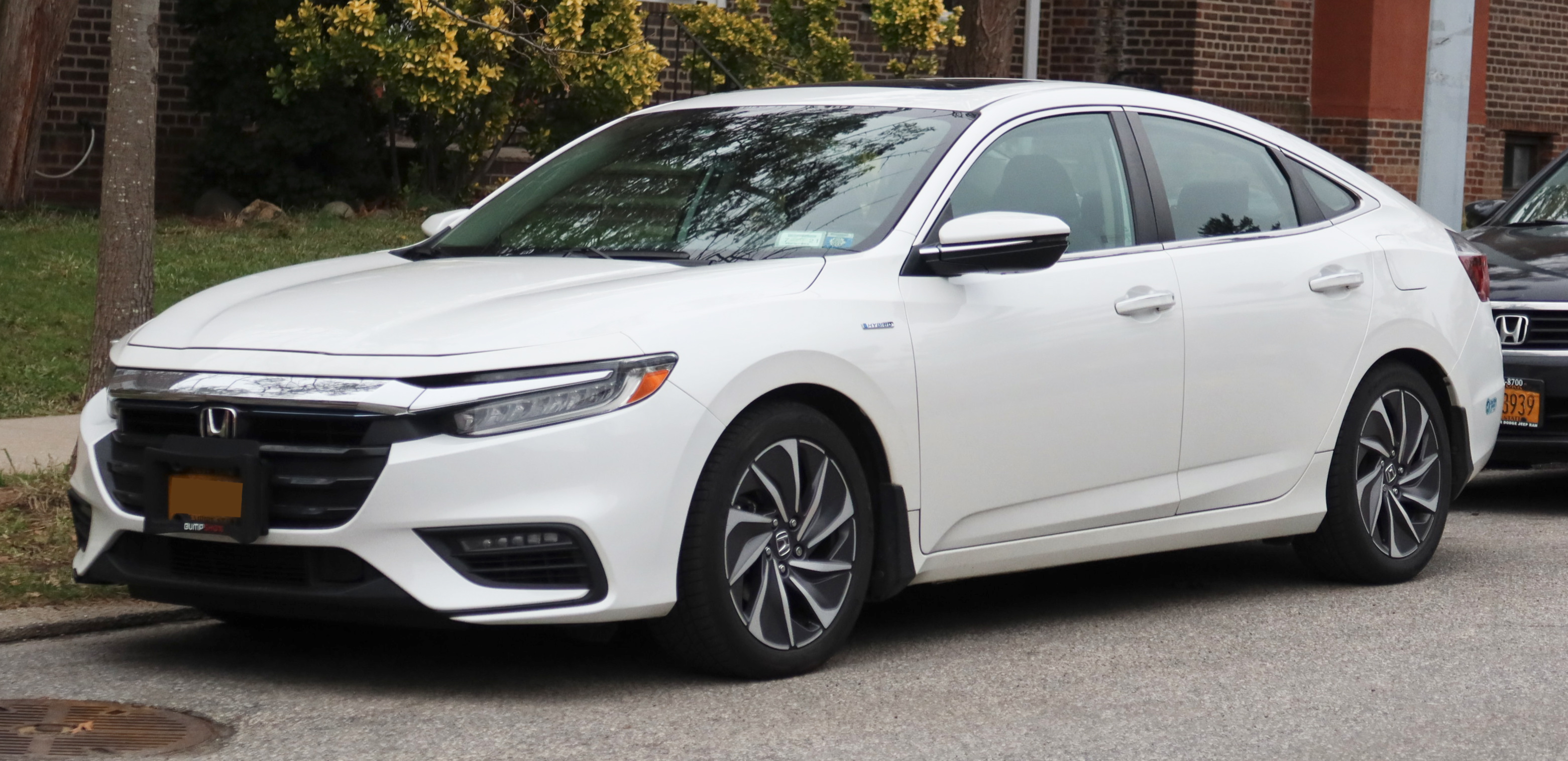
- 2020 Honda Insight Touring (US)

Overview
- Production: June 2018– September 2022
- Model years: 2019–2022
- Assembly: Japan: Yorii, Saitama (Honda Yorii Factory); United States: Greensburg, Indiana (HMIN)
- Designer: Daisuke Tsutamori

Body and chassis
- Class: Compact car
- Body style: 4-door sedan
- Related: Honda Civic (tenth generation)

Powertrain
- Engine: 1.5 L LEB-MMD Atkinson cycle DOHC I4 (gasoline)
- Electric motor: 96 kW (129 hp; 131 PS) AC PMSM
- Hybrid drivetrain: Power-split hybrid (Sport Hybrid i-MMD)
- Battery: 1.2 kWh lithium-ion

Dimensions
- Wheelbase: 2,700 mm (106.3 in)
- Length: 4,663 mm (183.6 in)
- Width: 1,819 mm (71.6 in)
- Height: 1,410 mm (55.5 in)
- Curb weight: 1,355–1,396 kg (2,987–3,078 lb)

Chronology
- Predecessor: Honda Civic Sedan (Japan); Honda Grace (Japan); Honda Civic Hybrid
- Successor: Honda Civic e:HEV

The third-generation Honda Insight prototype debuted at the 2018 North American International Auto Show, and the production version was unveiled at the 2018 New York International Auto Show. It is based on the tenth-generation Honda Civic sedan, and shares similar exterior and interior dimensions (although the Insight is about one inch longer than its non-hybrid counterpart). Unlike the previous Insight, it is a traditional sedan, not a five-door liftback.

The new Insight uses Honda's third generation two-motor hybrid powertrain, featuring a 1.5-liter gasoline engine that runs on an Atkinson cycle engine, combined with an electric motor and a lithium-ion battery pack.

The Insight shares the same trunk space as the tenth-generation Honda Civic sedan, as the batteries for the Insight do not impede on trunk space. The fully digital LCD instrument cluster was taken from the larger 2018 Honda Accord, and many interior styling features were taken from the tenth-generation Honda Civic Sedan, which is assembled at the same Greensburg, Indiana, plant as the all-new Insight. Honda projects a 55 mpg_{‑US} (4.3 L/100 km; 66 mpg_{‑imp}; 23 km/L) city, 49 mpg_{‑US} (4.8 L/100 km; 59 mpg_{‑imp}; 21 km/L) highway fuel economy, and 52 mpg_{‑US} (4.5 L/100 km; 62 mpg_{‑imp}; 22 km/L) combined rating for the 2019 Insight LX and EX trim levels, as compared to the 51 mpg_{‑US} (4.6 L/100 km; 61 mpg_{‑imp}; 22 km/L) city, 45 mpg_{‑US} (5.2 L/100 km; 54 mpg_{‑imp}; 19 km/L) highway, and 48 mpg_{‑US} (4.9 L/100 km; 58 mpg_{‑imp}; 20 km/L) combined fuel economy ratings on the top Touring trim, which introduces leather seating to the Insight for the first and only time. The difference in fuel economy between the versions is due to the higher weight and added equipment of the Touring version.

The third-generation Honda Insight went on sale at Honda dealerships in the United States in June 2018 as a 2019 model year vehicle. It was also launched in Mexico on September 6, 2018, and later in Japan on December 13, 2018, and went on sale on the next day.

For Japan-spec Insight, added some improvements in May 2020, new variant was added: EX Prime Style. In addition, with this minor model change, the two-motor hybrid system has been renamed to the globally unified name "e:HEV", resulting in the removal of the "HYBRID" emblems.

In April 2022, Honda announced that the Insight would be discontinued after the 2022 model year, with production ending in June. A new Civic Hybrid replaced the Insight.

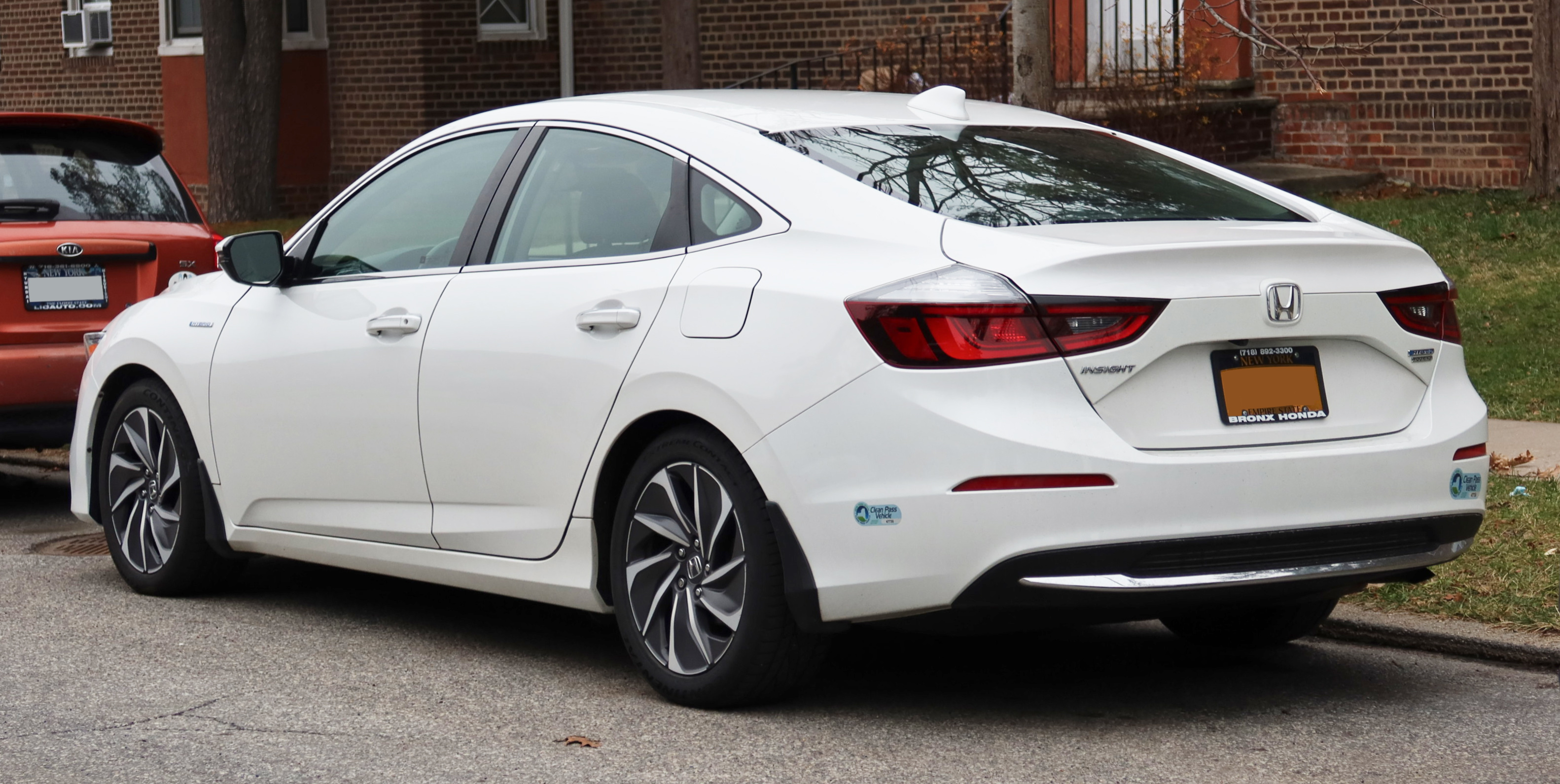
Rear view

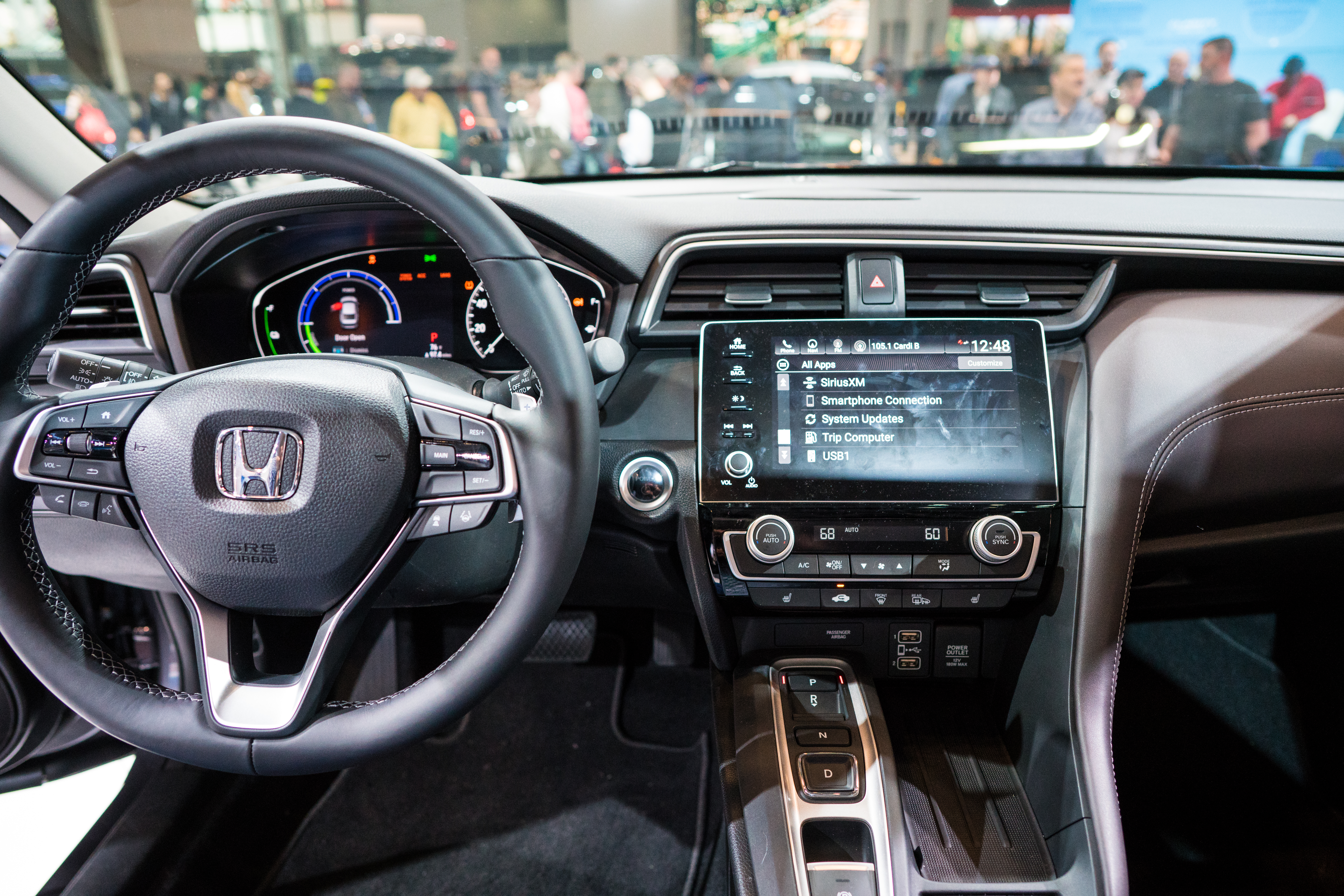
Interior

== Fourth generation (RM7; 2026) ==
Fourth generation (RM7)
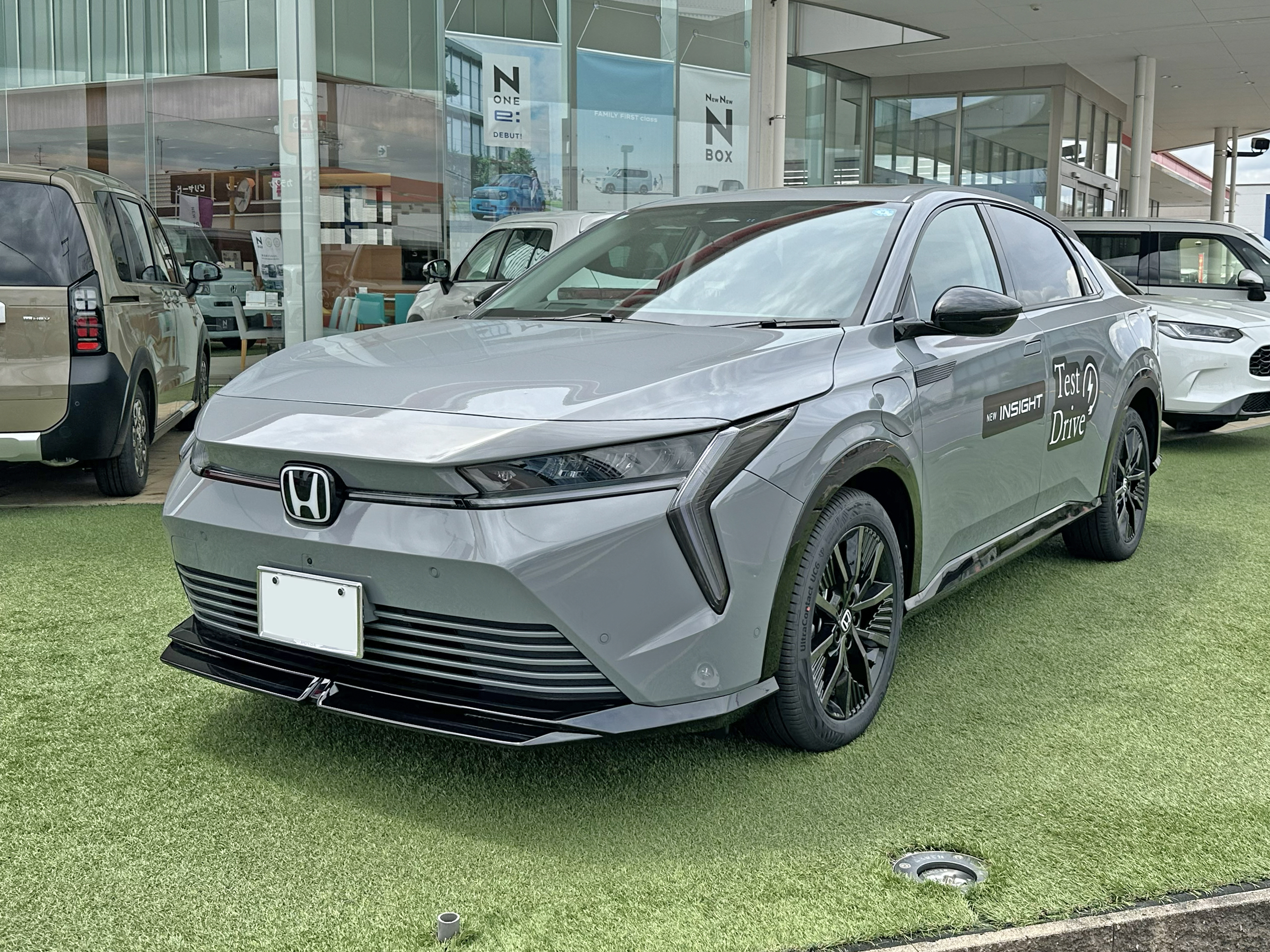

Overview
- Also called: Honda e:NS2 (China); Honda e:N2 (Thailand)
- Production: 2026–present
- Assembly: China: Wuhan (Dongfeng Honda)

Body and chassis
- Class: Compact crossover SUV
- Body style: 5-door SUV
- Layout: Front-motor, front-wheel-drive
- Platform: Honda e:N Architecture F
- Related: Honda e:NP1/e:NS1/e:Ny1/e:N1

Powertrain
- Electric motor: MCF62 permanent magnet synchronous motor
- Power output: 150 kW (204 PS; 201 hp)
- Battery: 68.8 kWh ternary lithium battery
- Electric range: 545 km (339 mi) (CLTC)

Dimensions
- Wheelbase: 2,735 mm (107.7 in)
- Length: 4,787 mm (188.5 in)
- Width: 1,838 mm (72.4 in)
- Height: 1,570 mm (61.8 in)
- Curb weight: 1,758 kg (3,876 lb)

The fourth generation Insight was unveiled in March 2026. Unlike previous generations, it is a fully battery-electric crossover SUV based on the Honda e:N2. It was launched in 16 April 2026. Sales limited to 3,000 units.

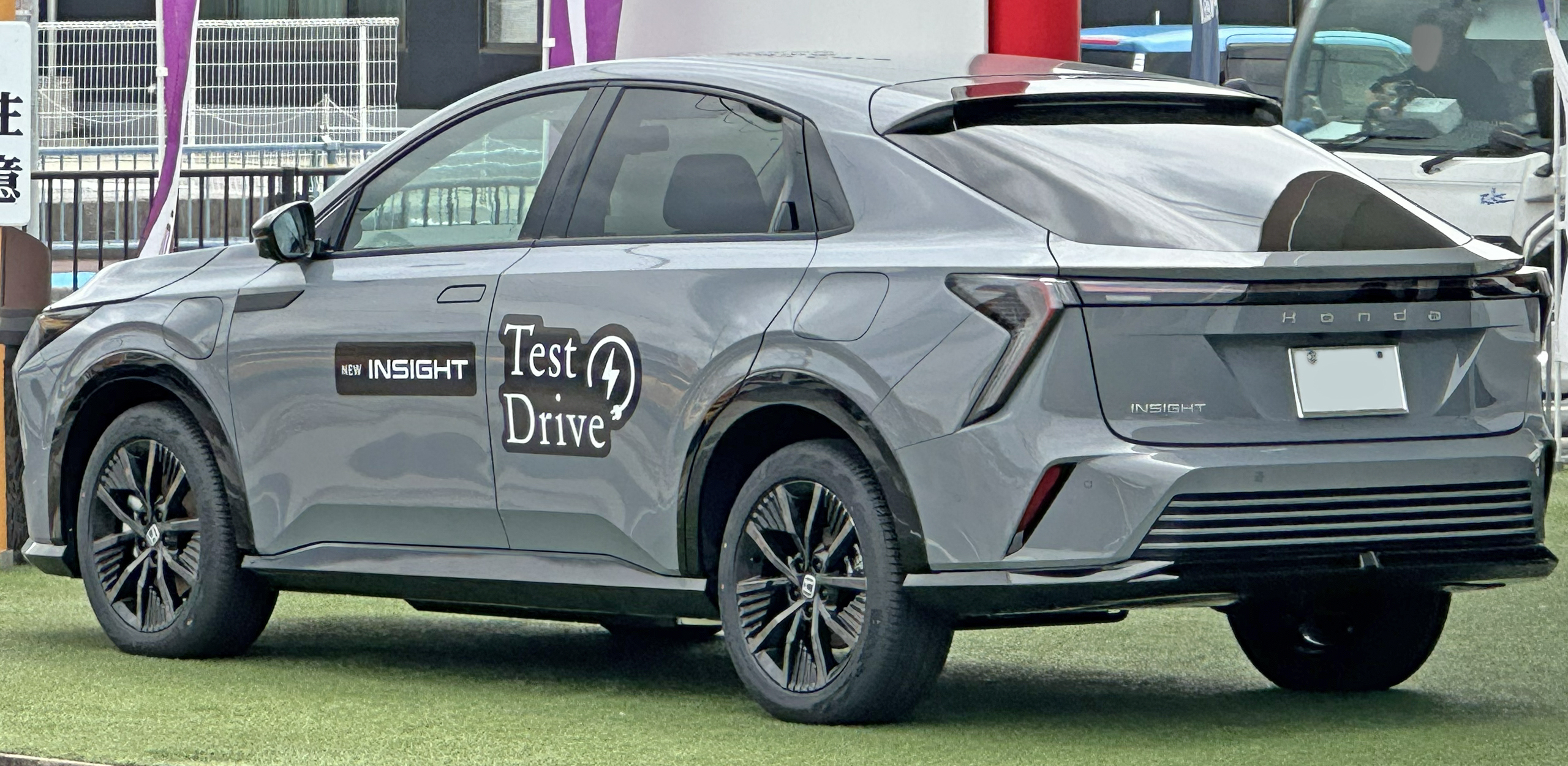
Rear view

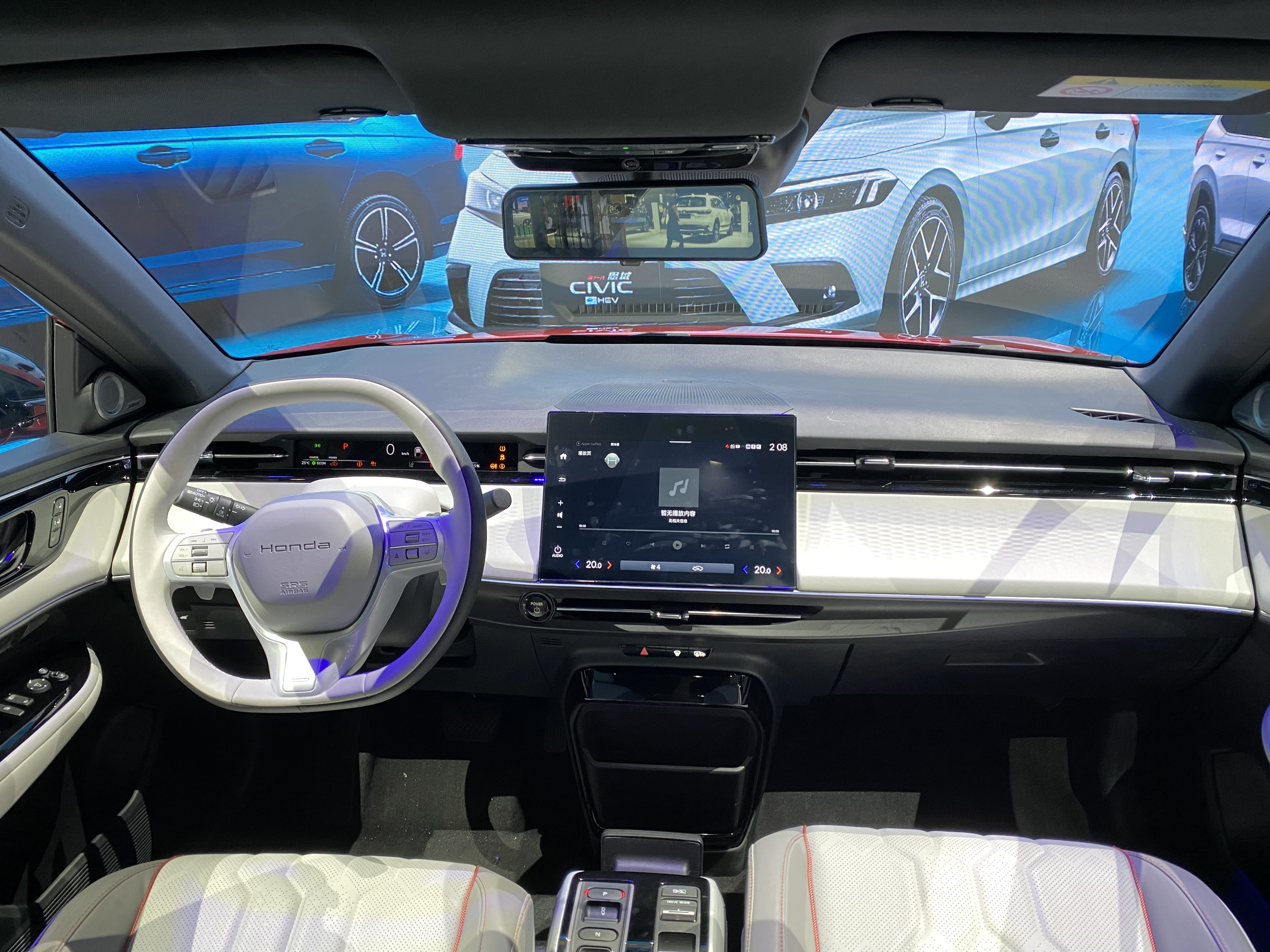
Interior

== Awards and recognition ==
First generation

- The Insight's engine won the International Engine of the Year award for 2000, and continued to hold the "Sub-1 liter" size category for the next six years.
- It received the U.S. Environmental Protection Agency's 2000 Climate Protection Award.
- It was named the Greenest Vehicle of the year for 2000, 2002, 2003 and 2006 by the American Council for an Energy-Efficient Economy (ACEEE).
- The Insight was nominated for the North American Car of the Year award for 2001.
- Until the 2016 Toyota Prius Eco, the 2000 Insight was the most efficient EPA-certified gasoline-powered vehicle ever, with a highway rating of 61 miles per US gallon (3.9 L/100 km; 73 mpg_{‑imp}) and combined city/highway rating of 53 miles per US gallon (4.4 L/100 km; 64 mpg_{‑imp}).

Second generation

- The Insight is awarded 2009 Good Design Award from the Japan Industrial Design Promotion Organization
- The American Automobile Association (AAA) awarded the Honda Insight the Top Commuter Vehicle in 2010.
- The 2010 Insight EX was awarded Top Safety Pick 2009 from Insurance Institute for Highway Safety
- Selected among Kelley Blue Book Top 10 Green Cars for 2010.
- Selected among Kelley Blue Book Top 10 Green Cars for 2011.
- Selected among the American Council for an Energy-Efficient Economy Greenest Vehicles of the Year for 2010, 2011 and 2012.
- 2012 Total Cost of Ownership Award in the hybrid car category, granted by Kelly Blue Book for the lowest projected costs during initial five-year ownership period in its category.

Third generation

- 2019 Green Car of the Year

== See also ==
- Honda CR-Z
- Honda Civic Hybrid
- Honda Clarity
- List of hybrid vehicles
