= Super ultra-low emission vehicle =

U.S. classification for passenger vehicle emissions

Super ultra-low emissions vehicle (SULEV) is a U.S. classification for passenger vehicle emissions. The classification is based on producing 90% fewer emissions than the average gasoline-powered vehicle. The SULEV standard is stricter than the standard for LEV (low emission vehicle) and ULEV (ultra-low-emission vehicle), however not as strict as PZEV (partial zero-emissions vehicle) which meets the SULEV standard for tailpipe emissions, but has zero instead of reduced evaporative emissions. Japan also offers an SU-LEV classification, for vehicles that show a 75 percent reduction in emissions vis-à-vis the 2005 emissions standards.

== US EPA Smog Ratings ==
The SULEV classification is defined among the Smog Ratings for vehicles in the United States Environmental Protection Agency's Green Vehicle Guide.

The U.S. EPA's site fueleconomy.gov has a Power Search that provides smog ratings for particular vehicle models based on model year, make (manufacturer), and other criteria. As of February 2026, the EPA smog rating for a vehicle model appears within the Energy and Environmental tab of that model's profile.

=== Examples ===
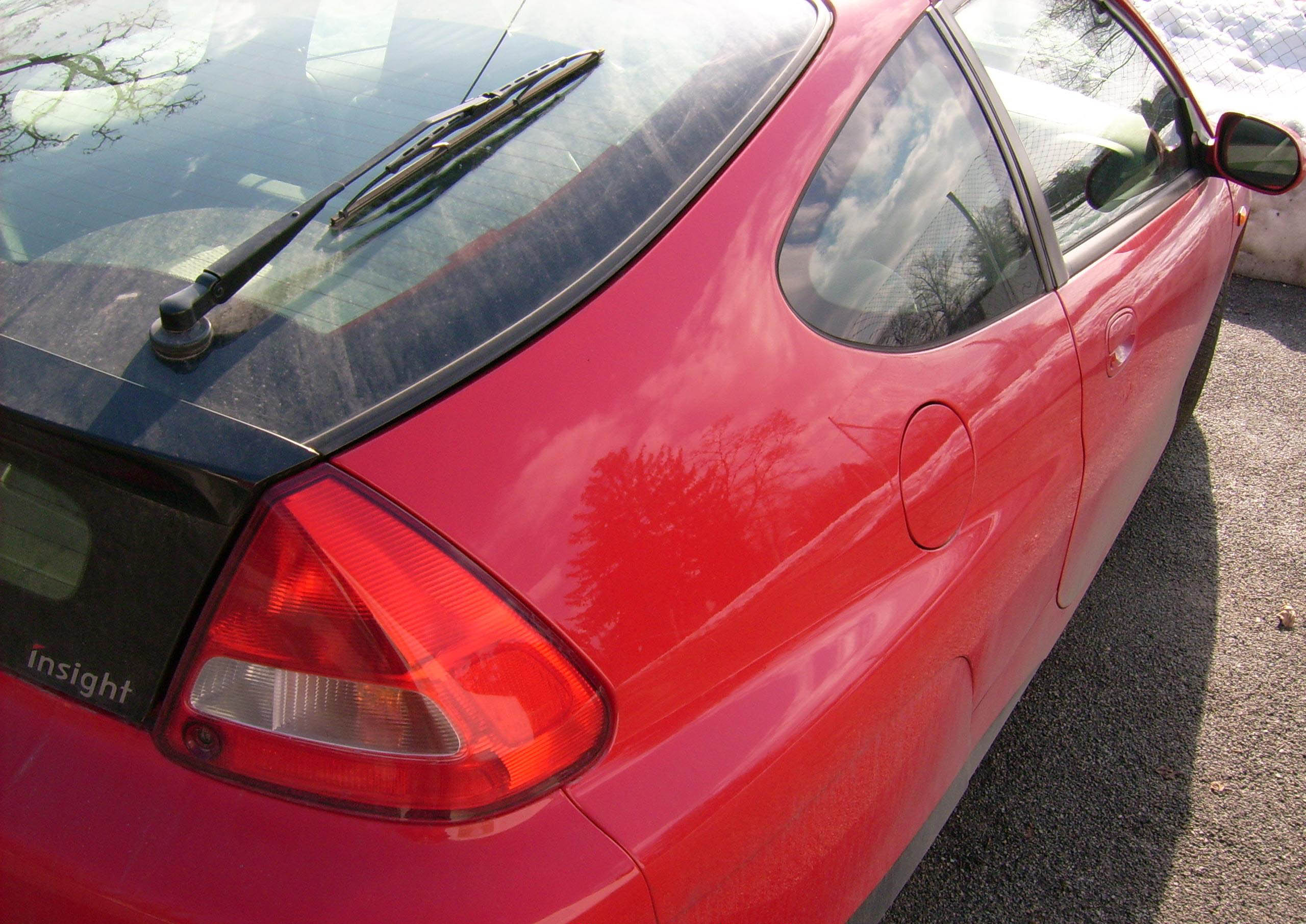
Honda Insight

Examples of vehicles delivering SULEV emissions performance include:

- Honda Accord 2000-
- Honda Insight (CVT transmission models only)
- Honda Civic Hybrid CVT transmission models only, AT-PZEV available in certain states
- Honda Civic GX Natural Gas
- Honda CR-Z (AT-PZEV)
- Toyota Prius
- Ford Focus SULEV
- BMW SULEV 230i, i3 REx, 128i, 328i, 325i, 325Ci, and 325iT
- Subaru PZEV Vehicles beginning with 2008 year models including Forester, Outback, and Legacy
- Chevrolet Volt
- Hyundai Elantra
- Lexus CT200h
- Honda Clarity PHEV 2018 – LEV3-SULEV20
- Kia Forte
- Volkswagen Jetta
- Mini Cooper Hardtop 4-Door
- Toyota RAV4 Hybrid
- Pontiac Grand Prix, 3800 V6 equipped vehicles beginning with the 2005 model year
- Toyota Highlander Hybrid
- Chrysler Pacifica Hybrid
- Volvo S80 PZEV

== Tax incentives ==
In California, manufacturers of SULEVs can be given a partial credit for producing a zero-emission vehicle (ZEV) and so a vehicle of this type can be administratively designated as a partial zero-emissions vehicle (PZEV). In order to qualify as a PZEV, a vehicle must meet the SULEV standard and, in addition, have zero evaporative emissions from its fuel system plus a 15-year/150,000 mi (241,402 km) warranty on its emission-control components.

In the case of hybrid vehicles this warranty is extended to the electric propulsion components (electric motor/generator/starter, battery, inverter, controls) and their mechanical interface to the driveline. However, the high-voltage battery warranty is limited to ten years (but still 150,000 miles).

See California AB 1493 .

== See also ==
- US emission standard – Vehicle emission regulations
- Automaker – Organizations involved with motor vehicles
- California Air Resources Board – Clean air agency in California, United States
- Car dealership – Business that sells and trades new or used vehicles
- Ultra-low-emission vehicle
- Partial zero-emissions vehicle – Automobile type
- Zero-emission vehicle – Class of motor vehicle
