= Low emission vehicle =

A low-emission vehicle is a motor vehicle that emits relatively low levels of motor vehicle emissions. The term may be used in a general sense, but in some countries it is defined in air quality statutes. Different groups of people ("go greens", "go with the flow" and "no greens") show different interest in low emission vehicles.

== See also ==
- Partial zero-emissions vehicle
- Super-ultra-low emission vehicle
- Ultra-low-emission vehicle
- United States emission standards
- Zero-emissions vehicle
