= Ultra-low-emission vehicle =

An ultra-low-emission vehicle (ULEV) is a motor vehicle that emits extremely low levels of motor vehicle emissions compared to other vehicles. In some jurisdictions it is defined in law; low and ultra low emission vehicles may be given tax or other advantages, while high emission vehicles may suffer restrictions or additional taxation.

== In California ==
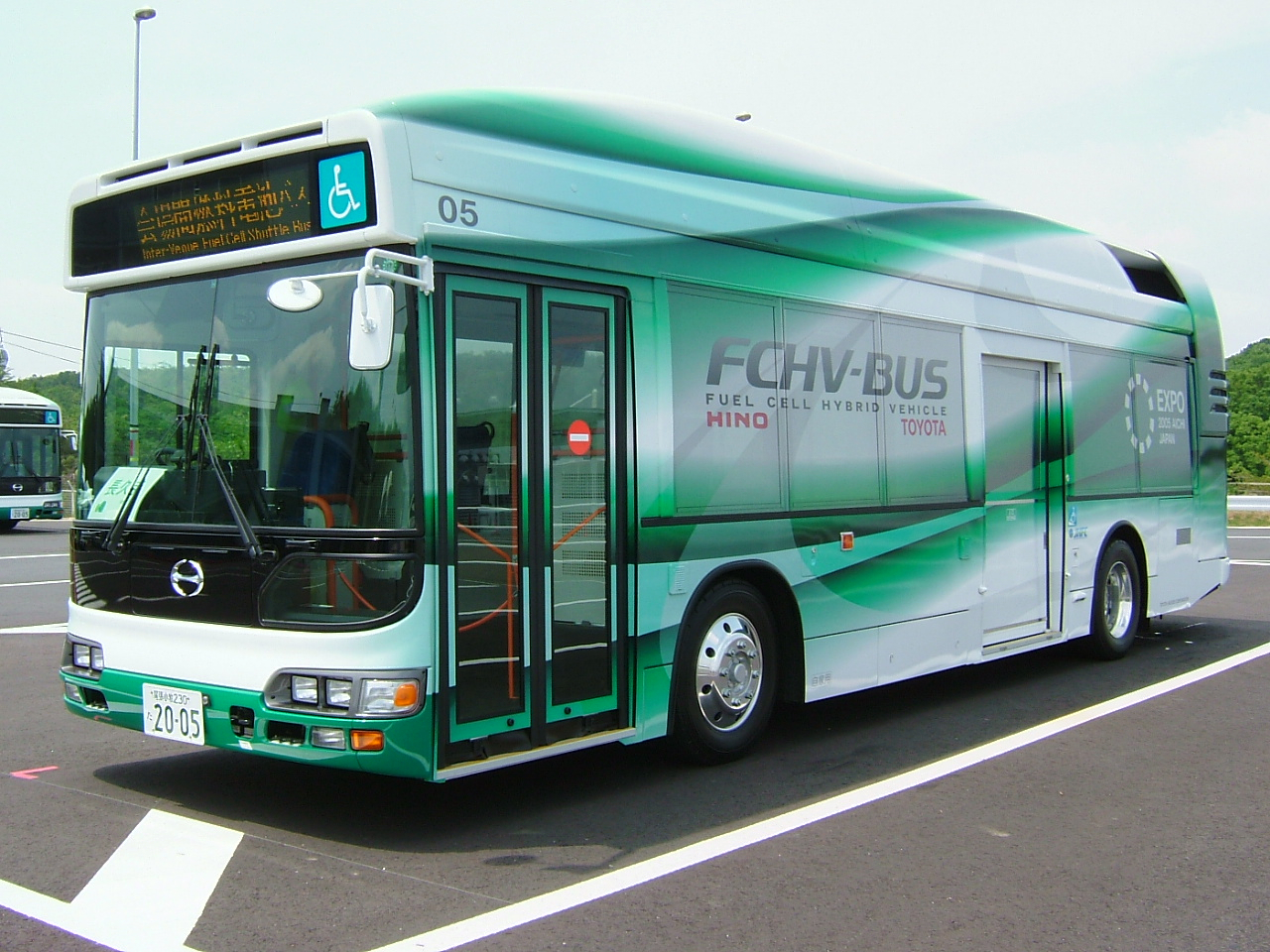
Fuel cell vehicle

California defines a ULEV as a vehicle that has been verified by the California Air Resources Board (CARB), United States to emit 50% less polluting emissions than the average for new cars released in that model year. Under LEV II regulations, the Tier I and TLEV classifications were removed for 2004. The ULEV is one of a number of designations given by the CARB to signify the level of emissions that car-buyers can expect their new vehicle to produce and forms part of a whole range of designations, listed here in order of decreasing emissions:

TLEV (transitional low-emission vehicle)
The least stringent emissions standard in California. California phased-out TLEVs in 2004.

LEV (low-emission vehicle)
The minimum standard for all new cars sold in California as of 2004.

ULEV (ultra-low-emission vehicle)

SULEV (super-ultra-low-emission vehicle)
SULEV emissions are 90% cleaner than the average new model year car.

PZEV (partial-zero-emission vehicle)
A PZEV meets SULEV tailpipe emission standards, but has no evaporative emissions (i.e., no unburned fuel leaves the fuel system). A PZEV has a 15-year / 150,000-mile warranty on its emission control components.

AT PZEV (advanced technology partial-zero-emission vehicle)
An AT PZEV meets the PZEV requirements but also meets some of the necessary conditions of a ZEV. AT PZEV include dedicated compressed natural gas vehicles and hybrid vehicles with engine emissions that meet PZEV standards.

ZEV (zero-emissions vehicle)
A ZEV has no tailpipe emissions. These include battery electric vehicles and hydrogen vehicles (fuel cell vehicles).

== See also ==
- Low-emission vehicle
- United States emission standards
