= Society of the Irish Motor Industry =

- Abbreviation: SIMI
- Formation: 1 February 1968; 58 years ago
- Merger of: Society of Irish Motor Traders; Irish Motor Traders Association
- Type: Trade association
- Purpose: Automotive industry
- Region served: Ireland
- Director General: Brian Cooke
- Dep. Director General: Tom Cullen
- Website: simi.ie

The Society of the Irish Motor Industry, known as SIMI, is an Irish trade association representing the automotive industry in Ireland with its membership including dealers, vehicle distributors and wholesalers.

== History ==
There were two motor trade organisations in Ireland, the Society of Irish Motor Traders and the Irish Motor Traders Association. It was proposed at a Society of Irish Motor Traders annual dinner held on 26 January 1967 to dissolve both the society and the traders association to form a singlular organisation due to changes in the motor industry and company structure along with overlapping interests between the organisations.

SIMI was formed on 1 February 1968 at an annual dinner in the Intercontinental Hotel in Dublin which marked the inauguration of the organisation. William G. Wilkinson, former president of the Society of Irish Motor Traders and later president of SIMI, also officially announced that there were plans to host a motor show in Ireland with assistance from the Society of Motor Manufacturers and Traders and from the Scottish Motor Traders Association. The first Irish motor show hosted by SIMI was held between November 15-23 in the RDS in Ballsbridge, Dublin.
