= Honda Dualnote =

Overview
- Manufacturer: Honda
- Production: 2001

Body and chassis
- Class: Concept car
- Body style: 4-door saloon
- Layout: mid-engined, all-wheel drive
- Related: Honda Insight

Powertrain
- Engine: 3.5 L DOHC i-VTEC V6 (gasoline hybrid)
- Electric motor: Three motor IMA system
- Transmission: 6-speed automated manual

The Honda Dualnote (also branded as the Acura DN-X) was a hybrid sports car concept manufactured by Honda. The car was initially unveiled at the 2001 Tokyo Motor Show.

== Background ==
In 1997, Honda introduced the Insight concept car, the first vehicle to feature the company's innovative Integrated Motor Assist electric hybrid system. The production version, launched in Japan in 1999, was the first hybrid car to be sold in North America. Although the Insight and its competitor, the Toyota Prius, were praised for their pioneering hybrid technology, both were criticized for their modest performance. Honda developed the Dualnote concept as a response, aiming to create a vehicle that balanced both performance and efficiency.

In 2002, the same vehicle was launched as the Acura DN-X at the New York International Auto Show.

== Model information ==
=== Design ===
The Honda Dualnote concept represented a significant departure from the brand's established design language. The four-seater featured a sleek, wedge-shaped body with a distinctive two-tone paint scheme. Its rear doors had a hidden profile to maintain a clean, coupe-like look. Inside, the cabin was designed with four individual seats separated by a full-length transmission tunnel, which limited rear passenger space due to the rear-mounted engine. The interior was equipped with a sophisticated triple-screen display system. The first screen, located in front of the driver, provided essential information like speed, fuel, and RPM, while also handling text messages and phone calls. A central screen displayed the navigation system, including turn-by-turn directions and a night vision feature using infrared cameras to detect pedestrians. The third screen was a multi-functional information monitor offering email, internet access, and a secondary navigation unit. Most of the car's functions were controlled via voice command.

=== Performance ===
The Dualnote was powered by a 3.5 litres (213.6 cu in) double overhead camshaft (DOHC) i-VTEC V6 motor with Honda's Integrated Motor Assist electric hybrid system. This engine setup was estimated to produce 400 horsepower (298 kW; 406 PS) while still being capable of fuel efficiency of approximately 18 km/L (51 mpg_{‑imp}; 42 mpg_{‑US}) (5.6 L/100 km).

=== Production and development ===
Honda decided not to produce the Dualnote in 2003. However, the Dualnote was the first Honda to feature both variable-rate steering and automatic high beam headlamps. The development of the IMA power unit supported development of the Civic and Accord Hybrid models and the CRZ sportscar.

== In popular culture ==
The Dualnote (and DN-X) has appeared in multiple editions of the Gran Turismo video game franchise.
