= Honda CR-Z =

Motor vehicle by Honda

Honda CR-Z (ZF1/ZF2)
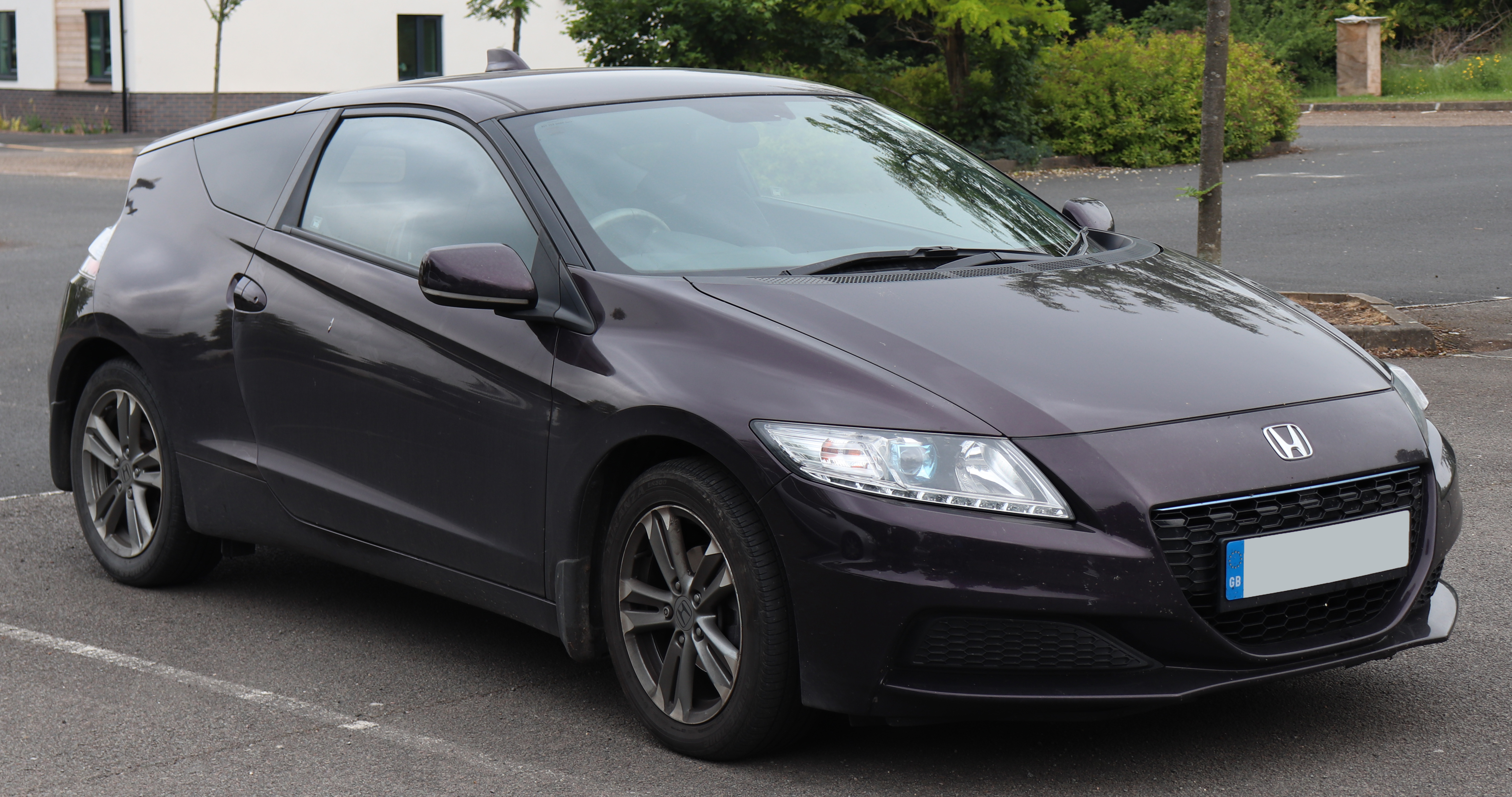

Overview
- Manufacturer: Honda
- Production: 2010–2016
- Model years: 2011–2016
- Assembly: Japan: Suzuka, Mie
- Designer: Norio Tomobe

Body and chassis
- Class: Sport compact car
- Body style: 3-door liftback
- Layout: Front-engine, front-wheel-drive
- Related: Honda Insight; Honda Fit Hybrid

Powertrain
- Engine: Gasoline Hybrid; 1,497cc (1.5 L) LEA SOHC i-VTEC I4
- Electric motor: MF6 DC brushless motor
- Transmission: CVT; 6-speed manual
- Hybrid drivetrain: Honda Integrated Motor Assist (IMA)

Dimensions
- Wheelbase: 2,435 mm (95.9 in)
- Length: 4,080 mm (160.6 in)
- Width: 1,740 mm (68.5 in)
- Height: 1,395 mm (54.9 in)
- Curb weight: 1,211–1,236 kg (2,670–2,725 lb)

Chronology
- Predecessor: Honda Insight (first generation)

The Honda CR-Z is a sport compact hybrid electric vehicle manufactured by Honda and marketed as a "sport hybrid coupe." It combines a gasoline-electric hybrid drivetrain with features typical of a sports car, including a standard six-speed manual transmission and a 2+2 seating layout (except in North America, where it was offered only as a two-seater).

The CR-Z was seen as a spiritual successor to the second-generation Honda CR-X, sharing similarities in name and exterior design.

In the United States, the CR-Z was classified as an Advanced Technology Partial Zero Emissions Vehicle by the California Air Resources Board. It was the third Honda hybrid available with a manual transmission, following the Insight and Civic Hybrid, and the only one in its class to offer this option.

The CR-Z used the sixth generation of Honda's Integrated Motor Assist (IMA) technology, first introduced with the original Insight. Sales began in Japan in February 2010, followed by the United States in August 2010. Production of the CR-Z ended at the end of 2016, to make room for the Accord Hybrid and Clarity.

== History ==
The design and production of the CR-Z followed two other Honda hybrid concept cars: the Honda Remix, introduced at the 2006 Los Angeles Auto Show, and the Honda Small Hybrid Sports, introduced at the 2007 Geneva Motor Show.

The Honda CR-Z was introduced as a concept vehicle on October 23, 2007, at the 2007 Tokyo Motor Show. Honda said the name "CR-Z" stood for "Compact Renaissance Zero" — reflecting the idea of a renaissance in the design of compact cars. At the show, CEO Fukui stated that a production model is "in the works" and that the car was intended to be "sporty, incredibly efficient and inexpensive". The "CR-Z" name was previously used as a grade level in 1985 and 1986 as the Honda Ballade CR-Z, which was sold alongside the original Ballade Sports CR-X in Japan.

The CR-Z was first shown in America at the 2008 Detroit North American International Auto Show. At the 2009 Tokyo Motor Show, Honda displayed a revised "CR-Z Concept 2009". The 2009 concept of the CR-Z had a very similar design to the production model. In January 2010, Honda introduced the production CR-Z at the 2010 North American International Auto Show in Detroit. At its introduction in 2010, it won the Car of the Year Japan Award.

=== Refresh ===
In 2016, the Honda CR-Z received a minor refresh. It received a change to the front and rear bumper, as well as a slightly revised interior. It also gained the EX-L trim from the refresh with a small increase in price. The base trim was renamed as LX and priced starting at $20,295 with a manual transmission, and $20,945 with a continuously variable transmission or CVT. The EX trim increased to $22,140 with a manual transmission, and $22,790 with a CVT. The new EX-L trim started at $24,440 with a manual transmission, and $25,090 with a CVT. The refresh changed a few colors as well. The North Shore Blue Pearl color changed to the Aegean Blue Metallic color, the Crystal Black Pearl color changed to the Jet Black color, and Premium White Pearl changed to Ivory Pearl. On the EX trim, the secondary interior red color changed to orange. The CR-Z also gained a few new wheel designs for the refresh. Honda had previously confirmed that a second generation of the CR-Z was under development, possibly for the 2018 model year, which never came to fruition.

== Safety ==
CR-Z models has received an average rating for side crash safety, an excellent (5 out of 5 stars) rating for rollover, and a 4 out of 5 star rating for frontal crash safety for 2012 and newer models. The 2011 model has an average frontal crash safety rating (3 out of 5 stars). Dual front airbags, side airbags and head-protecting side curtains are standard equipment. Antilock brakes (ABS), electronic brakeforce distribution (EBD).

ANCAP test results* Honda CR-Z 1.5L variants (2011)
| Test | Score |
|---|---|
| Overall | 5 /5 stars |
| Frontal offset | 14.56/16 |
| Side impact | 16/16 |
| Pole | 2/2 |
| Seat belt reminders | 3/3 |
| Whiplash protection | Not Assessed |
| Pedestrian protection | Adequate |
| Electronic stability control | Standard |

== Development ==
The project leader, Norio Tomobe, worked previously as chief engineer on Honda's Mobilio Spike and Elysion.

The basic concept of the CR-Z was to create a fun-to-drive sports car with driving characteristics of a Honda. Chief chassis engineer Terukazu Torikai explained in a video that during the development process “this car was brought to Europe at each prototype stage to be tested under various road conditions to evaluate whether the desired performance had been achieved.”

== Powertrain ==
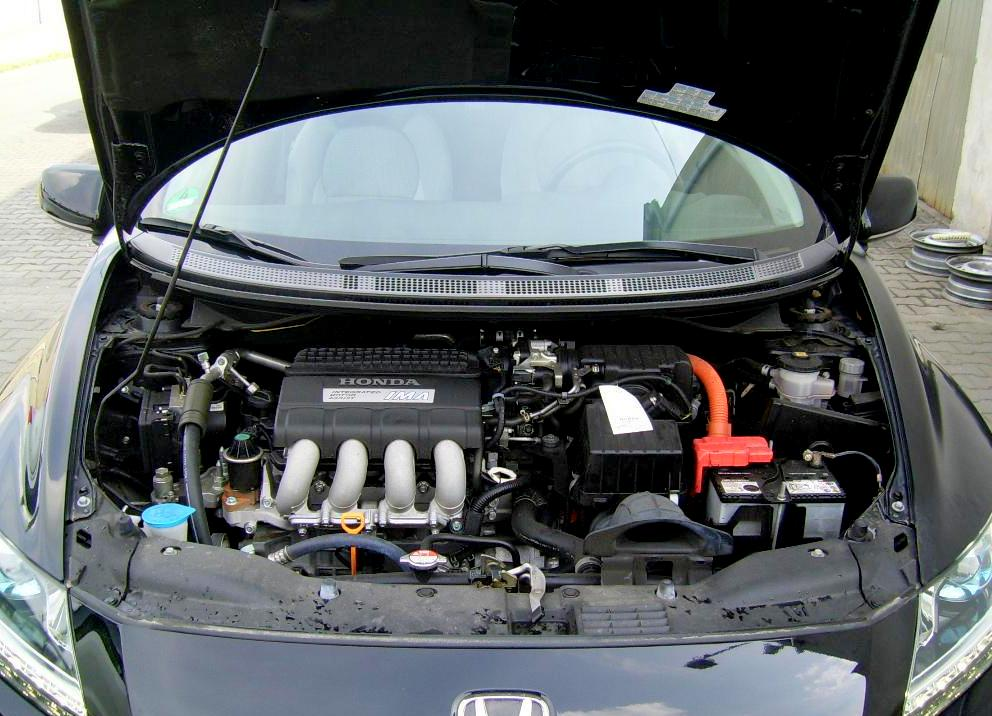
Engine bay of a Honda CR-Z.

The CR-Z is powered by a 1.5 L (1,497 cc; 91.4 cu in) i-VTEC SOHC 16-valve straight-four engine, designated LEA, with Honda's Integrated Motor Assist (IMA) hybrid-electric system. A six-speed manual transmission is standard equipment and a continuously variable transmission (CVT) is available. The system delivers a combined peak output of 121 bhp (90 kW; 123 PS) at 6000 rpm and 128 lb⋅ft (174 N⋅m) at 1000 to 1500 rpm (123 lb⋅ft (167 N⋅m) on CVT-equipped models). The gasoline engine contributes 111 bhp (83 kW; 113 PS) at 6000 rpm and 106 lb⋅ft (144 N⋅m) at 4800 rpm for the CVT version; the electric motor produces 10 kW (13 hp; 14 PS) at 1,500 rpm and 79 N⋅m (58 lb⋅ft) at 1,000 rpm

On November 21, 2012, Honda released the 2013 CR-Z to the United States market, which other than minor cosmetic changes, included a more powerful electric motor (up from 10 to 15 kW [13 to 20 hp; 14 to 20 PS]), and a new, higher voltage (144V), 0.6 kWh lithium-ion battery pack. The 2013 CR-Z delivers a combined peak output of 130 hp (97 kW; 132 PS) at 6,000 rpm and 140 lb⋅ft (190 N⋅m) of torque (127 lb⋅ft [172 N⋅m] on CVT-equipped models), a gain of 8 hp (8 PS; 6 kW) and 12 lb⋅ft (16 N⋅m) of torque (4 lb⋅ft (5 N⋅m) on CVT equipped models).

A new Plus Sport System was now standard. If the battery is more than 30 percent charged and the CR-Z is traveling over 18 mph (29 km/h), the driver can press the "S+" button on the steering wheel to deliver increased acceleration for up to five seconds. Manual-transmission versions also receive both a larger clutch and a new lower final drive ratio. EPA-rated fuel economy figures increased by 1 mpg city for CVT equipped models, and 1 mpg highway for those with the six-speed manual transmission.

An early road test of a Japanese-market CR-Z resulted in 0–100 km/h (0–62 mph) in 10.5 seconds and the quarter mile in 17.6 seconds. Inside Line performed the 0–60 mph (0–97 km/h) test in 8.8 seconds, and Motor Trend, in 8.3 seconds.

== Fuel economy ==
Japanese fuel economy ratings are 4.0 litres per 100 kilometres (59 mpg_{‑US}) for CVT and 4.4 litres per 100 kilometres (53 mpg_{‑US}) for MT in 10•15 mode; and 4.4 litres per 100 kilometres (53 mpg_{‑US}) for CVT and 4.9 litres per 100 kilometres (48 mpg_{‑US}) for MT in JC08 mode.

The 2011 CR-Z U.S. EPA ratings are 31 miles per US gallon (7.6 L/100 km; 37 mpg_{‑imp}) for city and 37 miles per US gallon (6.4 L/100 km; 44 mpg_{‑imp}) for highway with manual transmission. The model with CVT transmission has a rating of 35 miles per US gallon (6.7 L/100 km; 42 mpg_{‑imp}) for city driving cycle and 39 miles per US gallon (6.0 L/100 km; 47 mpg_{‑imp}) for highway. Beyond U.S. EPA estimates, among drivers reporting real-world fuel economy the CR-Z averages nearly 39 mpg overall.

When comparing fuel economy to the CR-Z's older cousin, according to fueleconomy.gov, the 1988 gasoline-powered Honda CR-X HF had an EPA rating of 41 miles per US gallon (5.7 L/100 km; 49 mpg_{‑imp}) city driving, and 49 miles per US gallon (4.8 L/100 km; 59 mpg_{‑imp}) highway driving. The CR-Z is ranked number four on 2011 EPA top ten list of fuel efficient vehicles for CVT equipped model and number ten for manual-transmission-equipped model.

== Price and sales ==
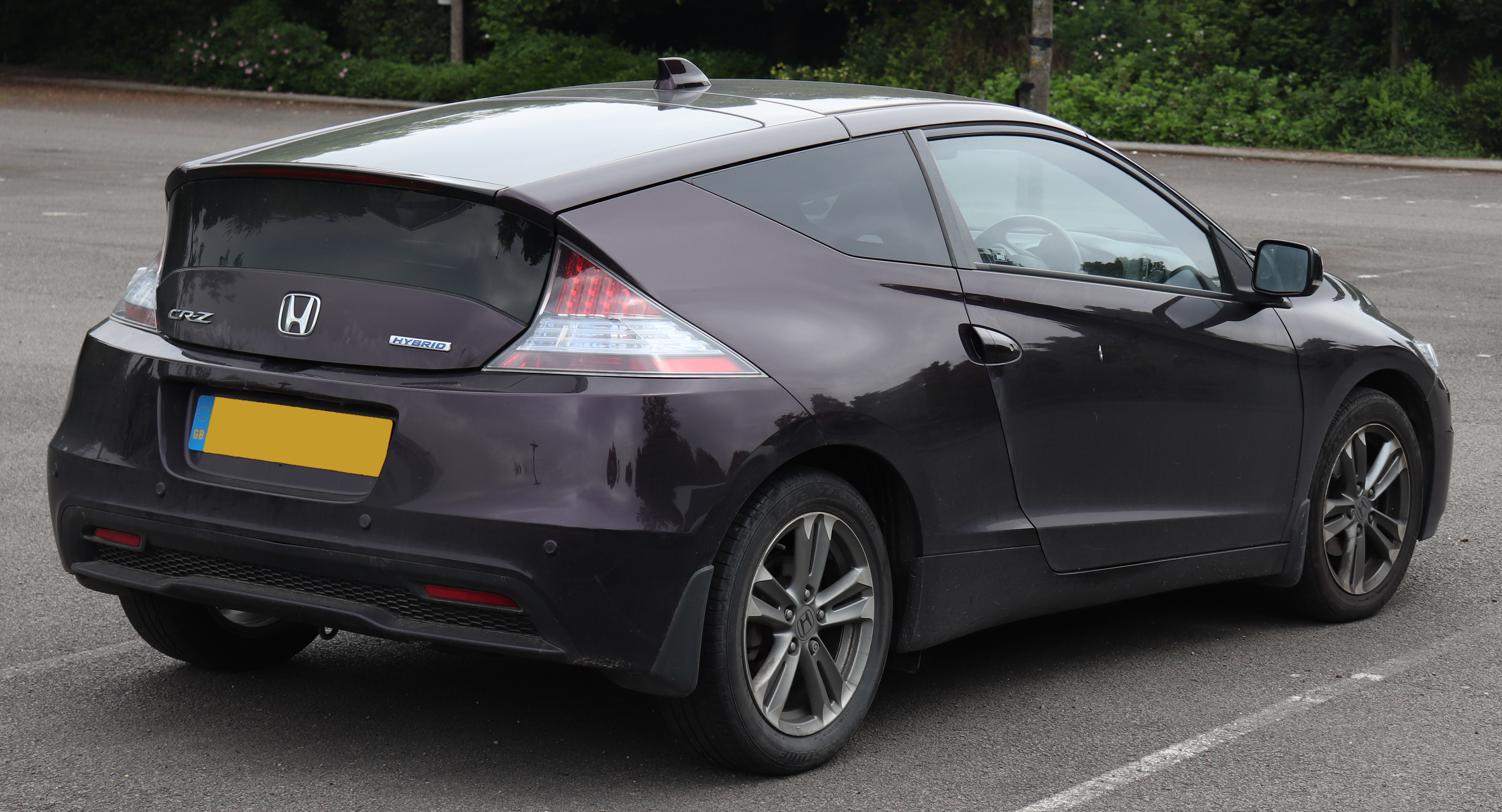
Rear view

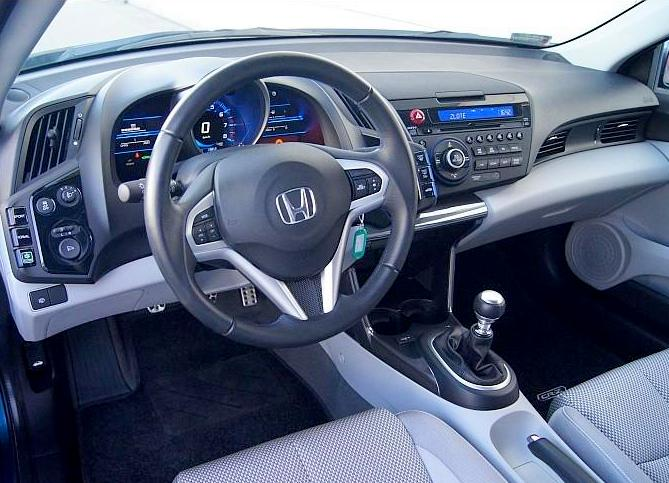
Interior

=== Japan ===
Sales of the CR-Z began in Japan on August 24, 2010 at a starting price of ¥2.3 million (~US$25,340) before any government subsidies. Honda announced that in less than one month it had received orders for more than 10,000 vehicles, far exceeding its sales forecast.

As of the end of August 2010, more than 19,000 CR-Z were delivered and sales orders received are three times higher than expected, which led to Japanese media comparing its success with the NSX in the 1990s, another sports car from Honda. In an interview in early February 2011, a Honda executive disclosed that Honda produces around 200,000 hybrids a year in Japan.

=== North America ===
Sales in North America started on February 26, 2010. The 2011 CR-Z was offered in three trim levels: base, EX, and EX with Navigation. The base CR-Z started at US$19,950, the CR-Z EX at US$21,510 and the EX with navigation trim was priced at US$23,310. The CR-Z pricing was similar to the now discontinued Honda Insight and had a lower price than the market leader Toyota Prius.

After its launch in late August 2010, there were 3,349 Honda CR-Z sold as of end of October 2010. It ranked as the fourth most sold hybrid in the U.S. for September and October of that year. U.S. sales for year 2010 reached 5,249 units, and ranked 11th in hybrid sales for that year. For year 2011 cumulative sales of the CR-Z in the U.S. reached 9,635 units through August, ranking number four in hybrid sales in 2011 and outsold only by the Hyundai Sonata Hybrid, Honda Insight, and Toyota Prius.

In addition to commercials airing during sporting events, Honda held a marketing competition available to universities throughout the United States. This competition allowed students to create public relations and social media campaigns for the vehicle. A team from Syracuse University won first place in the competition, followed by runners-up New England School of Communications and University of La Verne.

=== Europe ===
The CR-Z was launched in the European market in mid-2010 after having been revealed at the 2010 Geneva Motor Show and was retired in 2014.

=== South Africa ===
Sales in South Africa were scheduled to begin on the 30 August 2010.

=== Malaysia ===
The CR-Z was launched for the Malaysian market on November 3, 2011, which made it the first in Southeast Asia to offer the three-door hybrid. Within a month, Honda received over 300 orders, over three times its target. The introduction of the CR-Z was a result of the 2012 Malaysian Budget that extended the full import duty and excise duty exemption to imported hybrid vehicles and electric cars to 31 December 2013. The 6-speed manual model was offered first, with plans to bring in the CVT version in 2012; in addition to white, three more colors will be offered by early 2012.

=== Australia ===
Honda announced that it would begin importing the CR-Z in mid-2011 after showing the car at the 2011 Australian International Motor Show in June but the launch was delayed by the earthquake and tsunami in Japan.

The CR-Z was finally launched in December 2011 with a base price of A$34,990 plus on-road costs in two grades: Sport and Luxury. Grades were identical except that Sport was only available with manual transmission while Luxury was only available with CVT automatic transmission and the addition of satellite navigation and glass roof.

In January 2015 Honda announced that it would cease selling the CR-Z in Australia citing rationalization of its hybrid model lineup but the CR-Z did not sell strongly in the Australian market with only 69 reported sales in 2014.

=== New Zealand ===
It was launched in New Zealand in December 2011.

=== Indonesia ===
Introduced in Indonesia International Motor Show 2012 in September 2012, the CR-Z was launched in February 2013. Honda CR-Z was the third hybrid car released in Indonesia after Toyota Prius and Toyota Camry Hybrid. Both the 6-speed manual or CVT automatic transmissions were available.

=== Philippines ===
Honda Cars Philippines Inc. introduced the CR-Z hybrid coupe to the Philippine market in August 2013. The CR-Z was offered in three variants; a standard trim, Modulo, and Mugen.

=== Pakistan ===
Honda Atlas Cars (Pakistan) Limited introduced the CR-Z hybrid coupe to the Pakistani market in December 2013 with a price tag of Rs.3,269,000 for the manual transmission and Rs. 3,419,000 for the Automatic. An additional Rs. 80,000 was charged for the Pearl/Metallic Colors only.

=== Sri Lanka ===
Honda CRZ was launched in Sri Lanka the same time it was launched in Japan.

== Aftermarket ==
Two Honda Performance Development CR-Z Racers entered the 25-hour of Thunderhill endurance race held on December 4–5, 2010 at Willows, California. The car, first shown to the public at 2010 SEMA Show, was fully stripped down with lowered suspension. A turbo charger was bolted to the engine raising output to 175 hp (130 kW) and 155 lb⋅ft (210 N⋅m) of torque, furthermore, the Integrated Motor Assist setup was modified utilizing components from Mission Motors and a push-to-pass function was added, making a total of 200 hp (149 kW) and 175 lb⋅ft (237 N⋅m) of torque when the button is pressed. One of the two entrants battled from a near 10-lap deficit to finish second in the Endurance 3 class, after suffering early in the race from two five-minute "stop-and-hold" penalties caused by refueling problems. The other entrant scored pole position of the class but failed to finish the race.

One of the most notable Honda CR-Z showcased during the SEMA Show in 2010 was built by Bisimoto, producing a claimed 533 hp (397 kW) thanks to a 64mm billet turbo, as well as custom pistons and valvetrain

=== CR-Z Mugen ===
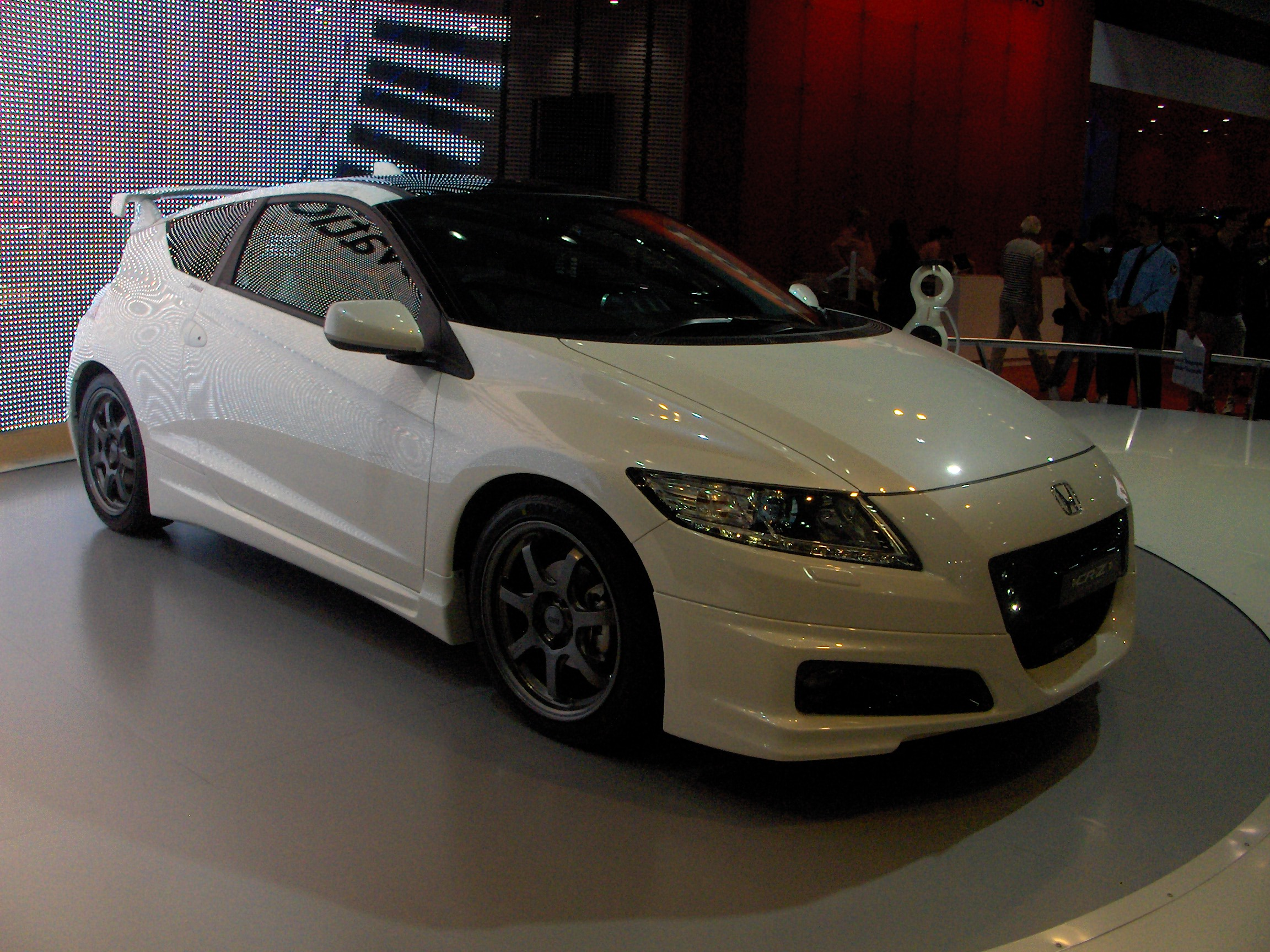
Honda CR-Z Mugen at the 2010 Australian International Motor Show.

A sportier and quicker variant called the CR-Z Mugen came with plenty of aftermarket parts from Honda's Motorsport division, Mugen. Parts include an Aero Package, a tweaked sports suspension, a special glossy black grille with daytime running lights, a triangular sports exhaust, carbon fiber shift knob, a set of 17-inch bronze/silver wheels in 7-spoke and minor interior cosmetic bits.

The car is powered by a 1.5-liter engine which has been equipped with a supercharger and a revised ECU. Thanks to these tweaks, the hybrid is rumored to have 178 hp (133 kW / 180 PS) instead of the concept's 197 hp (147 kW / 200 PS). This enables the car to accelerate from 0–60 mph (97 km/h) in 6.1 seconds before hitting a top speed in excess of 130 mph (209 km/h).

The CR-Z Mugen was slated to be launched early 2012 with a base price of approximately £23,000 ($35,820 / €26,780).

=== CR-Z Mugen RZ ===
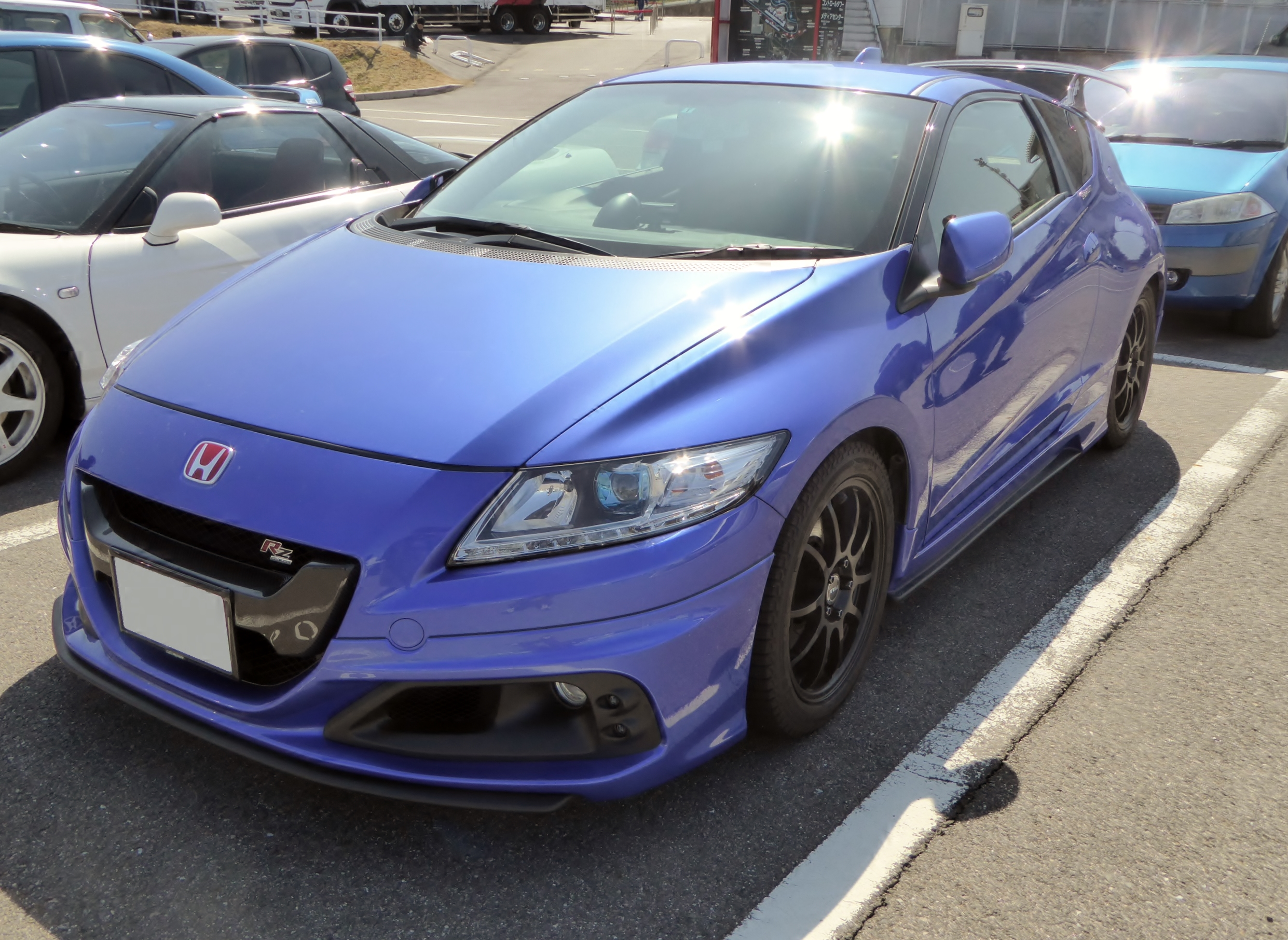
CR-Z Mugen RZ (Japan)

Honda's Motorsport Division Mugen has announced plans to offer a high-performance Honda CR-Z in Japan. Production was limited to 300 units.

Dubbed the Mugen RZ, the model features an aerodynamic body kit with a front spoiler, a revised grille and modified side skirts. It also features a rear diffuser, an adjustable wing and a sports twin exhaust system. Other highlights include an adjustable suspension, high-performance brakes and 17-inch alloy wheels.

The cabin has two-tone seats, a carbon fiber gear knob, a boost meter and an individually-numbered plaque.

Power is provided by a supercharged 1.5-liter engine that produces 156 HP (115 kW) and 185 Nm (136 lb-ft) of torque. It is backed up by an IMA hybrid system that develops 20 HP (15 kW) and 78 Nm (58 lb-ft) of torque.

Honda Performance Development (HPD)

Beginning August 21, 2014, Honda North America's racing division, HPD, released a line of performance parts for the CR-Z available through North American Honda dealers.

The parts line-up includes a supercharger kit, limited-slip differential, performance suspension, cat-back exhaust, rear diffuser, 18 inch alloy wheels, larger brake calipers and rotors, and decals and badges. The supercharger kit can only be installed on manual transmission equipped vehicles and requires the dealer to send the car's ECU directly to HPD for reprogramming. This would allow an estimated 197 HP and 176 ft-lb of torque to be produced using 91 octane fuel.

If the supercharger kit was equipped at a Honda dealer, the original powertrain warranty would not be voided and carry over after installation was complete. Cars with ECU's that have gone through HPD's programming also receive an individually numbered plaque placed just below the radio unit.

=== Spoon Sports CR-Z ===
Japanese tuning company Spoon Inc. created a version of the CR-Z that was 135 kg (298 lb) lighter.

== Motorsport ==
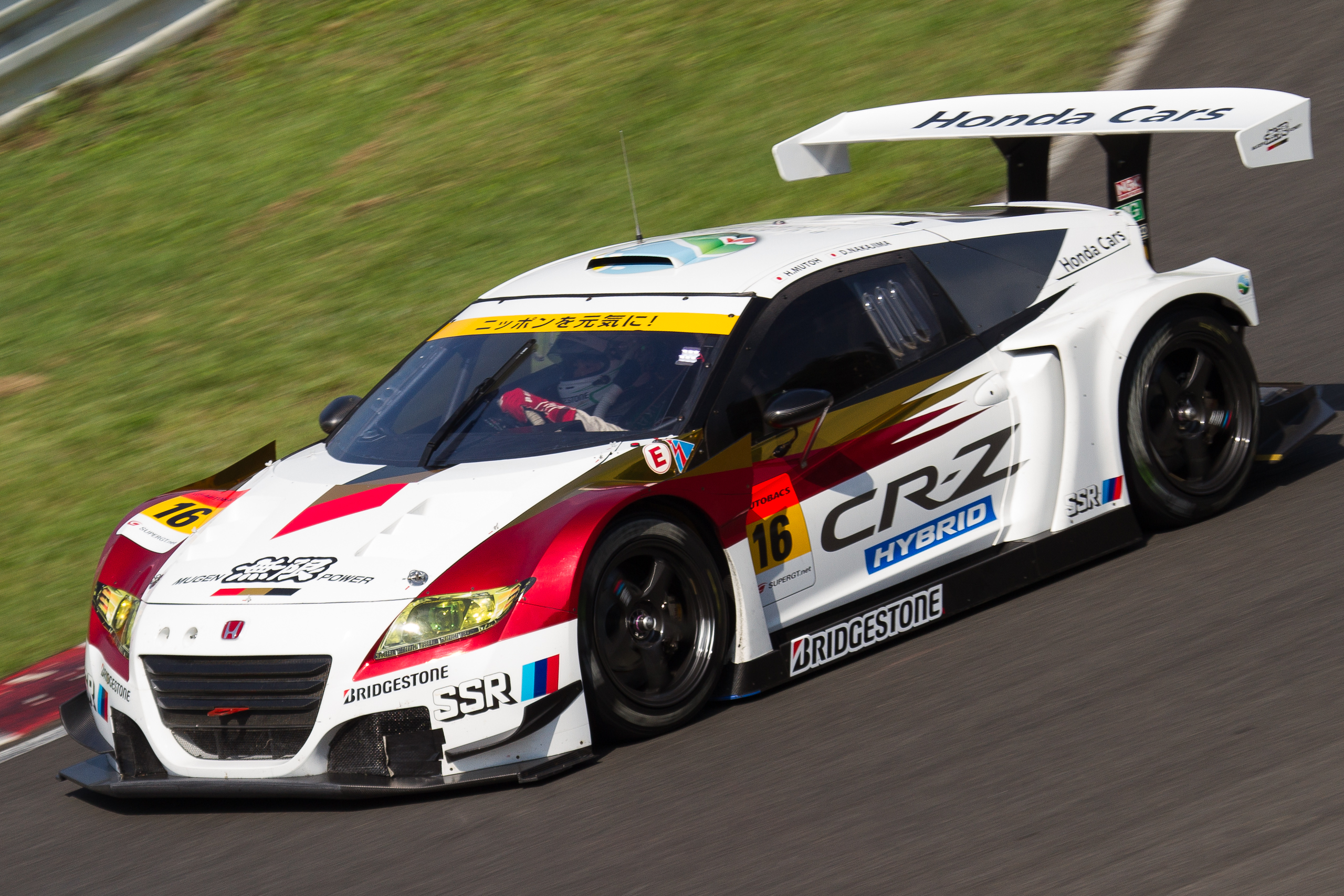
Team Mugen's Honda CR-Z GT during a practice session in Sportsland Sugo.

In 2012, Honda announced that a CR-Z would compete in the GT300 class of the Japanese Super GT racing series, called the CR-Z GT. The car used a 2.8-liter HR28TT twin-turbocharged V6 sourced from Honda's LMP2 sports cars and was paired with a hybrid system developed exclusively for the CR-Z GT. It completed its debut at the fourth round of the 2012 Super GT Series at Sportsland Sugo, fielded by Mugen Motorsports.

CR-Z GTs were used in the series by Team Mugen and Autobacs Racing Team Aguri across three seasons of Super GT competition. Team Mugen's car, driven by Hideki Mutoh and Yuhki Nakayama, would go on to win the GT300 class championship in the 2013 Super GT Series. The CR-Z GT continued to race until the end of the 2015 Super GT Series.

== Awards and recognition ==
- Japan Car of The Year 2010–11
- 2010 Good Design Award from the Japan Industrial Design Promotion Organization
- 2010 Green Car of the Year awarded by Motoring UK
- Most Economical & Environment Friendly Sports hybrid in the 2010 RAC Brighton to London Future Car Challenge
- 2011 Wheels Car of the Year
- Selected by Mother Earth News among the "Best Green Cars" of 2011.

== Gallery ==
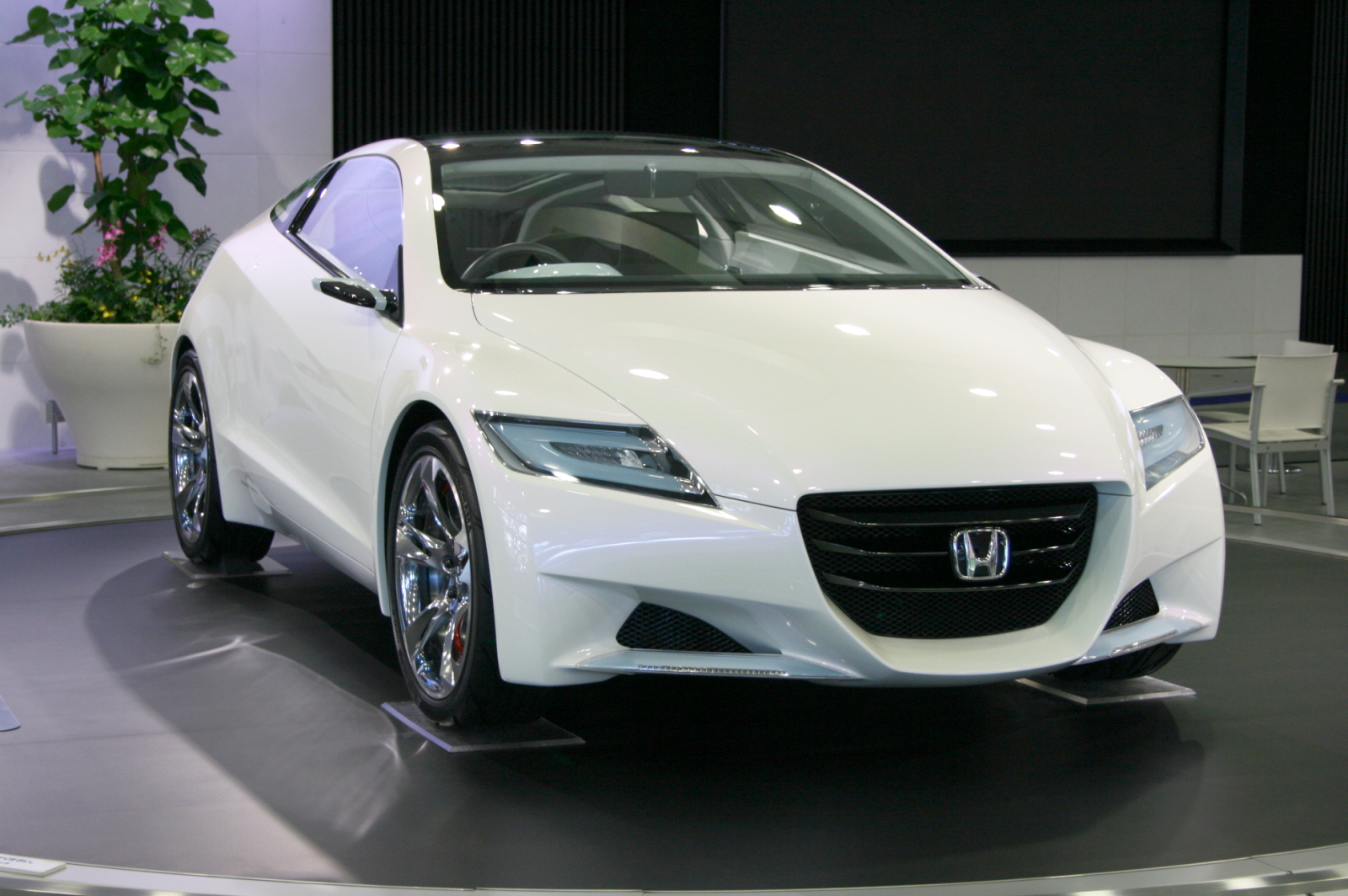
Honda CR-Z Concept 2007.

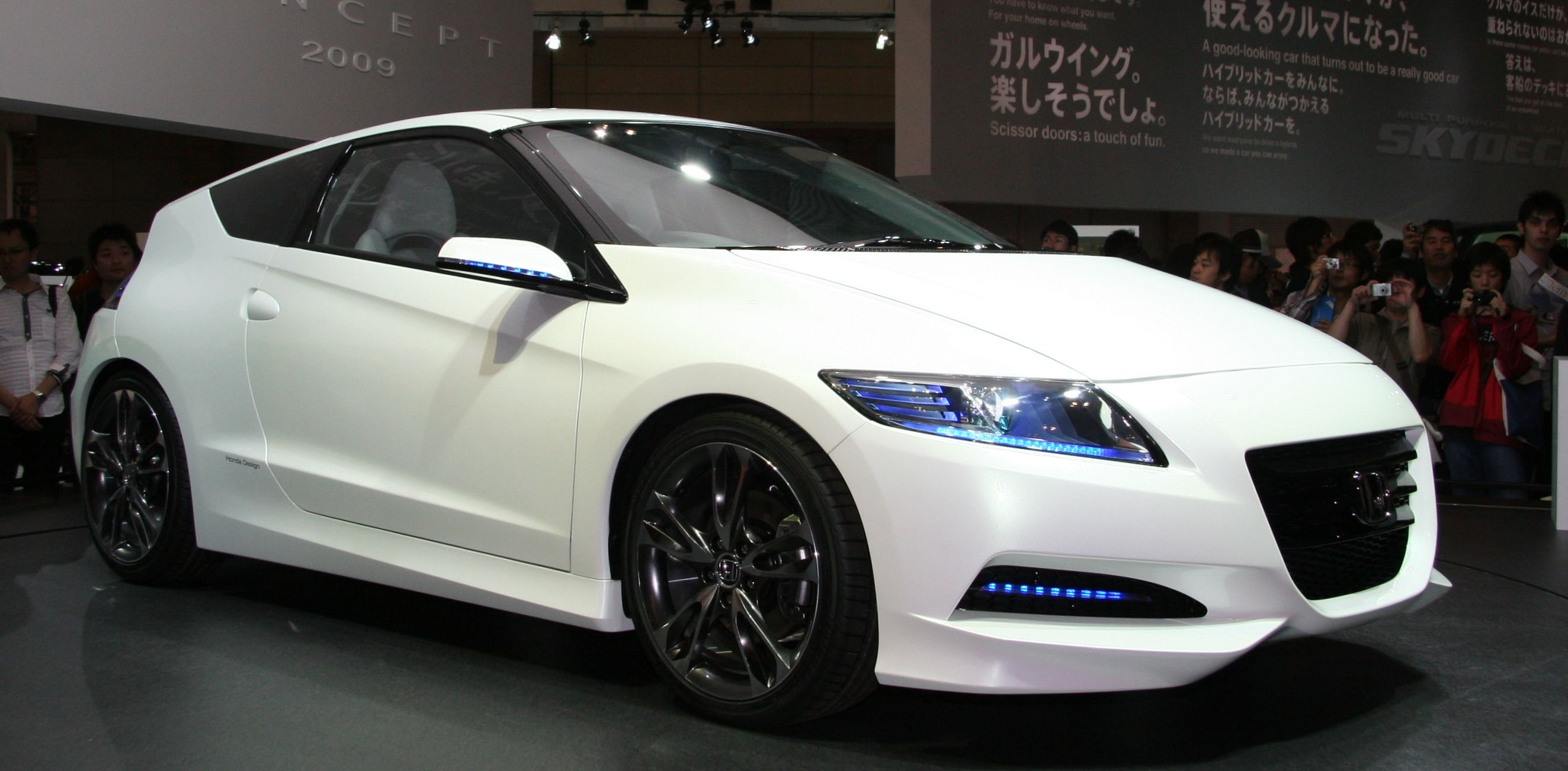
Honda CR-Z Concept 2009.

== Sales ==
| Year | U.S. |
|---|---|
| 2010 | 5,249 |
| 2011 | 11,330 |
| 2012 | 4,192 |
| 2013 | 4,550 |
| 2014 | 3,562 |
| 2015 | 3,073 |
| 2016 | 2,338 |
| 2017 | 705 |
| 2018 | 38 |

== See also ==
- Honda Civic Hybrid
- Honda Insight
- Hybrid electric vehicle
- Honda FCX Clarity
- List of hybrid vehicles
