= Honda LaGreat =

Honda LaGreat (RL1)
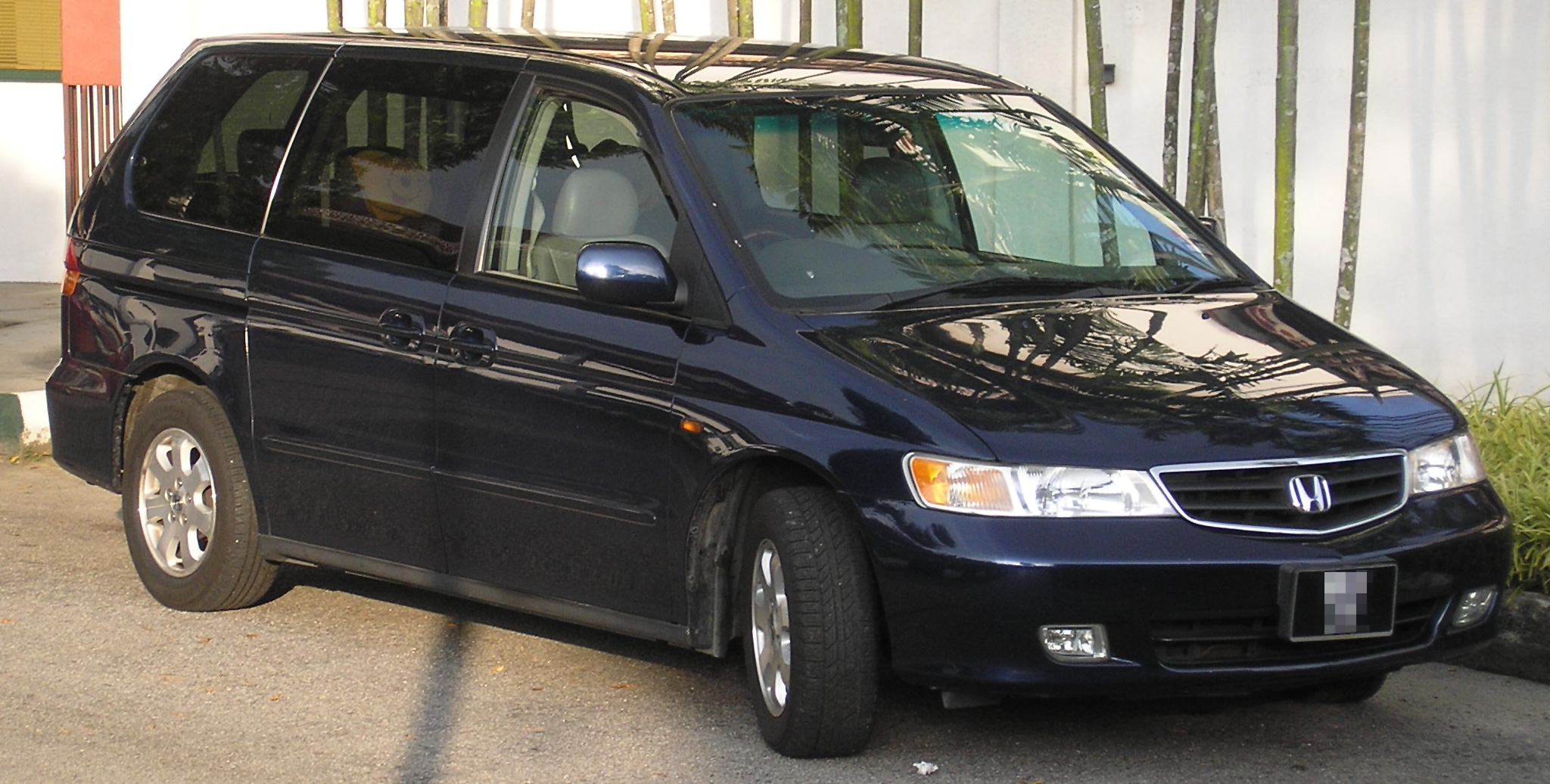

Overview
- Manufacturer: Honda
- Also called: Honda Odyssey (North America)
- Production: 1999–2005
- Assembly: Alliston, Ontario, Canada
- Designer: Mitsuhiro Honda (1996)

Body and chassis
- Class: Minivan
- Body style: 5-door minivan

Powertrain
- Engine: 3.5 L J35 V6
- Transmission: 4-speed B7XA automatic (1999-01); 5-speed BYBA automatic; (2002-04)

Dimensions
- Wheelbase: 118.1 in (3,000 mm)
- Length: 201.2 in (5,110 mm)
- Width: 75.6 in (1,920 mm)
- Height: 69.7 in (1,770 mm); 68.5 in (1,740 mm) (LX)

Chronology
- Predecessor: Honda Odyssey (RA1-RA5)
- Successor: Honda Elysion

The Honda LaGreat, known in some markets as the Honda RL1, is a passenger van produced by Japanese automaker Honda for the Japanese market. Produced in Alliston, Ontario, Canada, the LaGreat was a rebadged version of the second generation North American Odyssey. The LaGreat was announced in 1999 as a larger and more luxurious model than the existing Japanese Honda Odyssey. Production of the model continued until 2005, when it was succeeded by the Elysion.

== Background ==
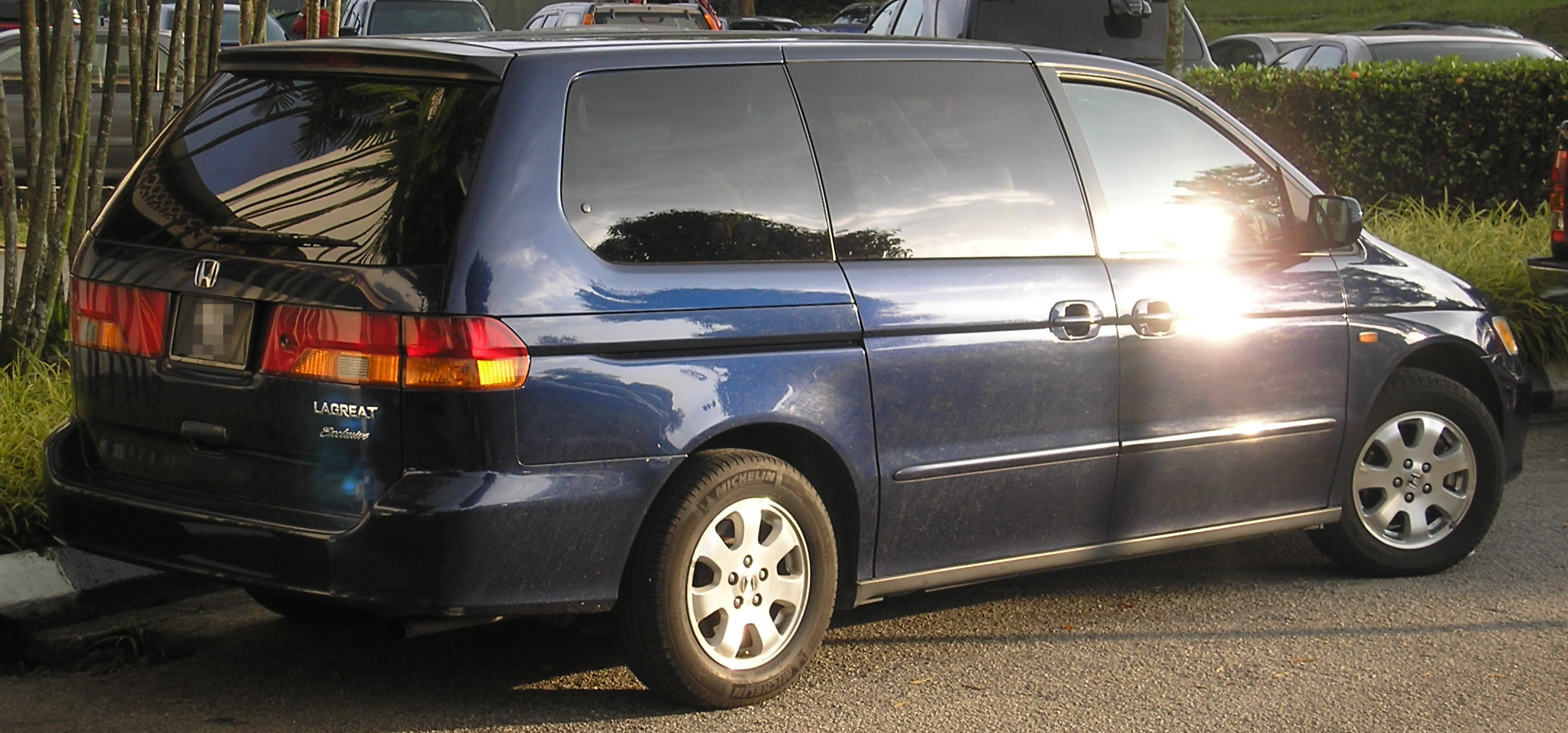
Rear view

With the success of the existing Odyssey minivan, Honda elected to design a luxury medium-sized passenger carrier for the consumer market. Honda marketed the LaGreat as an all-family vehicle, with abundant practicality and reliability.

The LaGreat was offered with a more powerful six-cylinder engine, which initially produced 210 PS (154 kW) and was later upgraded to produce 240 PS (177 kW). Additionally, Honda offered the option of seating eight adults, through a bench seat in both the middle and third rows. At the time, the LaGreat was one of the largest minivans available in Japan, rivaling the size of the Toyota Estima and Chrysler Grand Voyager. Leather seats were standard and a moonroof was optional on the top-end Exclusive variant.

== Technology ==
The Honda LaGreat was the first passenger van available with a navigation system and a rear DVD entertainment unit. Additionally, from 2002 to 2005, the LaGreat had optional fog lights and side curtain airbags.

== Criticism ==
The LaGreat failed to meet Honda's expected sales figures, primarily due to the van's price. Additionally, the van failed to appeal to the Japanese market base due to its larger size and the fact that its fuel economy was worse than the competition. Honda sold luxury vehicles in Japan at Honda Clio dealerships.
