= Integrated Motor Assist =

Honda hybrid vehicle powertrain technology

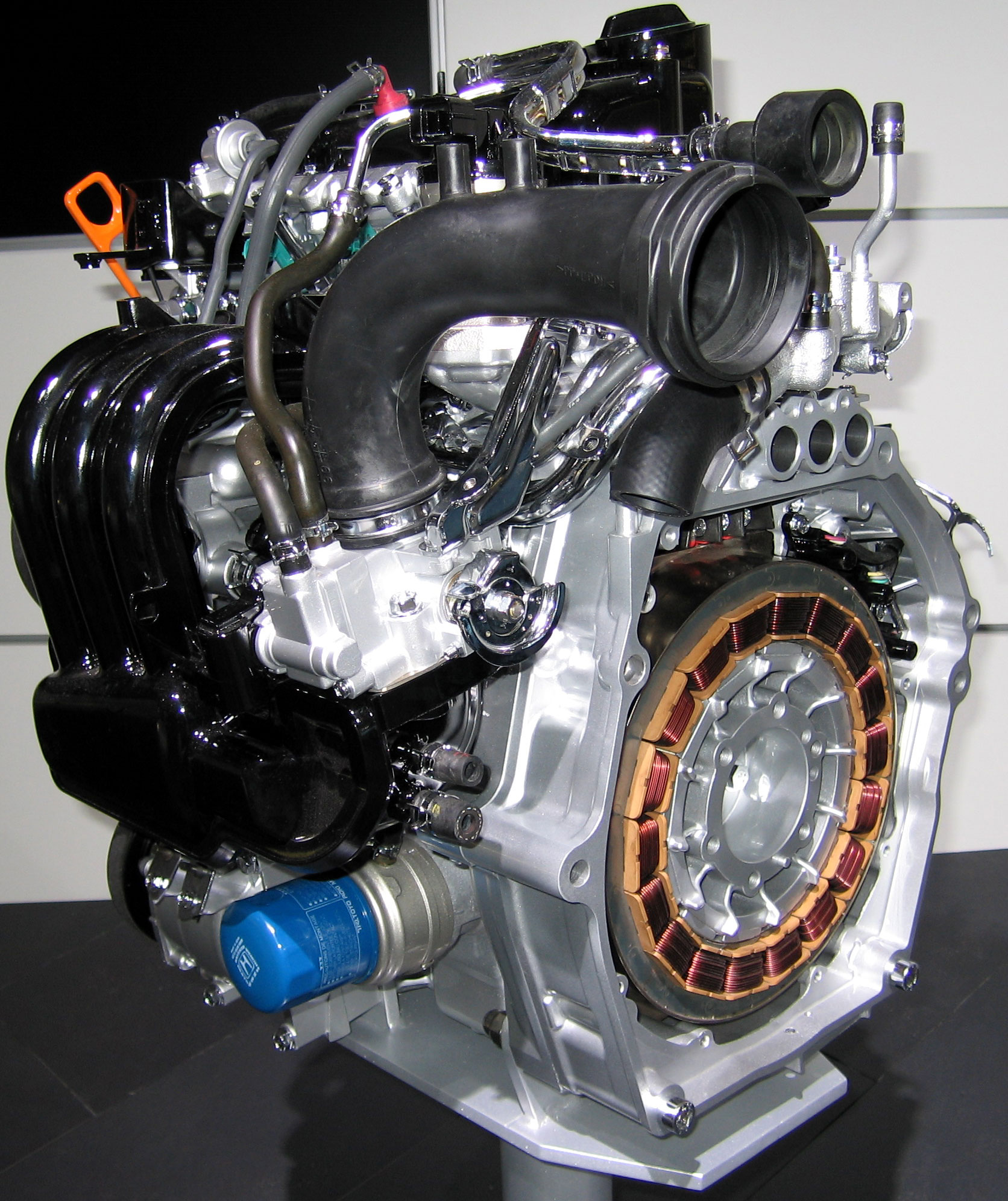
Honda Insight IMA, 1999.

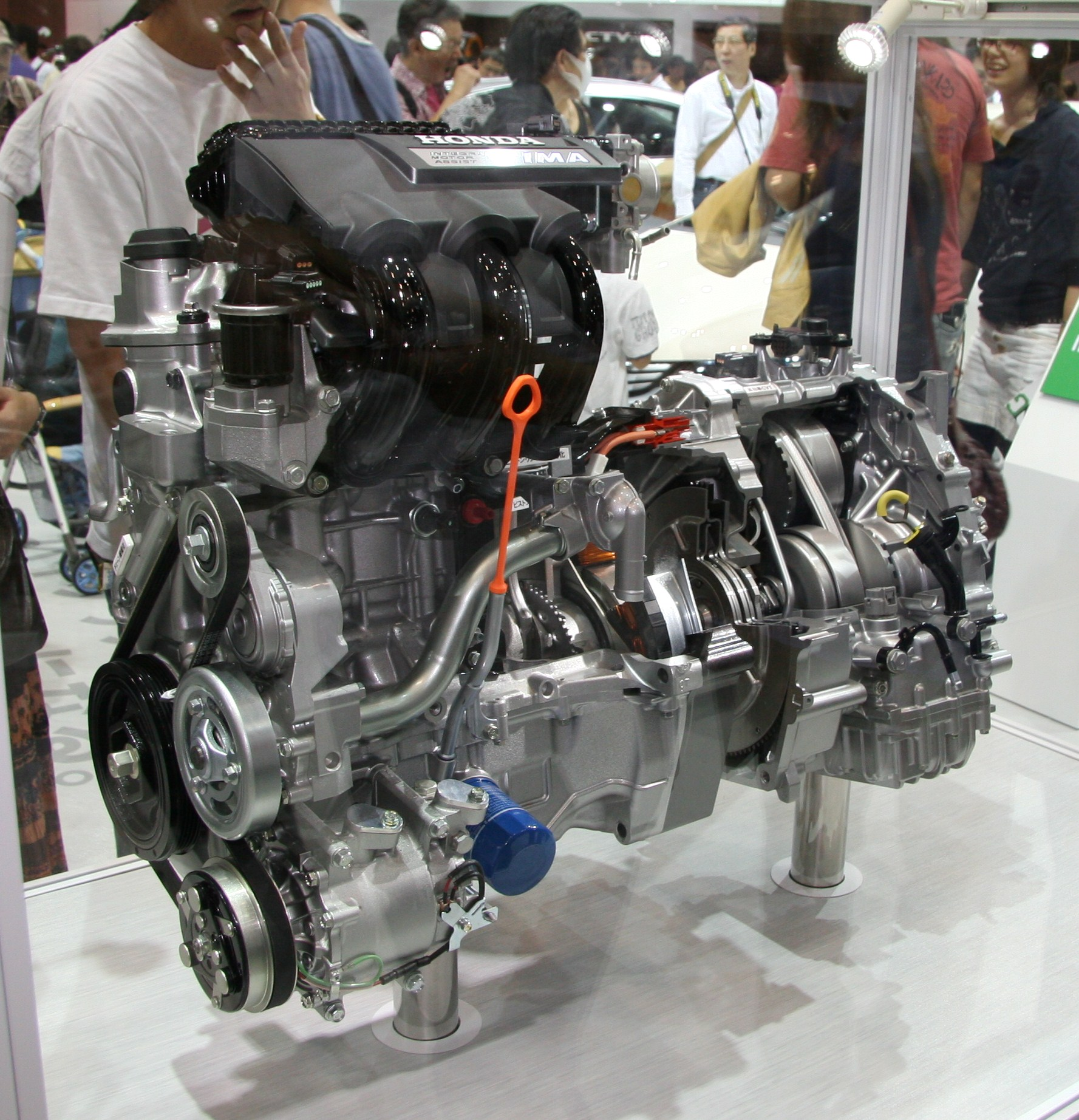
Honda Insight IMA, 2009.

Integrated Motor Assist (IMA) is a hybrid vehicle powertrain technology developed by Honda, used in the Honda Insight, the Honda Civic Hybrid, and the Honda Accord Hybrid.

It was first introduced in 1999 with the debut of the first-generation Honda Insight. It uses an electric motor positioned between the vehicle's internal combustion engine and transmission. The motor performs multiple functions, serving as a starter motor, generator, engine balancer, and providing power assist during acceleration. The system is regarded as one of the earliest examples of what are now called mild hybrid systems.

IMA was Honda's primary hybrid system through the 2000s and early 2010s, and was employed in several models including the Honda Civic Hybrid, Honda Accord Hybrid, and Honda CR-Z, before being phased out in favor of Honda's newer hybrid systems.

== Overview ==
The first-generation IMA system was a mild hybrid design intended to operate exclusively in conjunction with the gasoline engine, without the ability to power the vehicle on electricity alone. In later versions, such as the 2006 Honda Civic Hybrid, the electric motor could propel the vehicle under certain conditions without engaging the engine. However, unlike systems such as Toyota's Hybrid Synergy Drive or the Global Hybrid Cooperation platform developed by General Motors and DaimlerChrysler, Honda's IMA featured a less powerful electric motor that limited its ability to decelerate or move the vehicle independently.

=== Regenerative braking ===
IMA incorporates regenerative braking, which captures kinetic energy during braking that would otherwise be lost as heat. This energy is stored and later used to assist acceleration. The system provides benefits such as enhanced acceleration, reduced engine workload, and extended brake component life by decreasing reliance on mechanical brakes. Supplementing engine output also allowed the use of smaller, more fuel-efficient gasoline engines, improving highway fuel economy compared to conventional vehicles.

=== Start-stop functionality ===
The IMA system also provides start–stop capabilities. When the vehicle comes to a complete stop, the gasoline engine automatically shuts off to reduce idling emissions and fuel consumption. The electric motor restarts the engine quickly when the driver releases the brake pedal (or, in manual transmission models, engages a gear). IMA-equipped vehicles also include a conventional starter motor as a backup, allowing the vehicle to operate when the high-voltage hybrid system is inactive. However, since the IMA system also replaces the alternator, prolonged operation in this mode would eventually discharge the 12 volt accessory battery, requiring an external recharge.

== List of vehicles using IMA ==
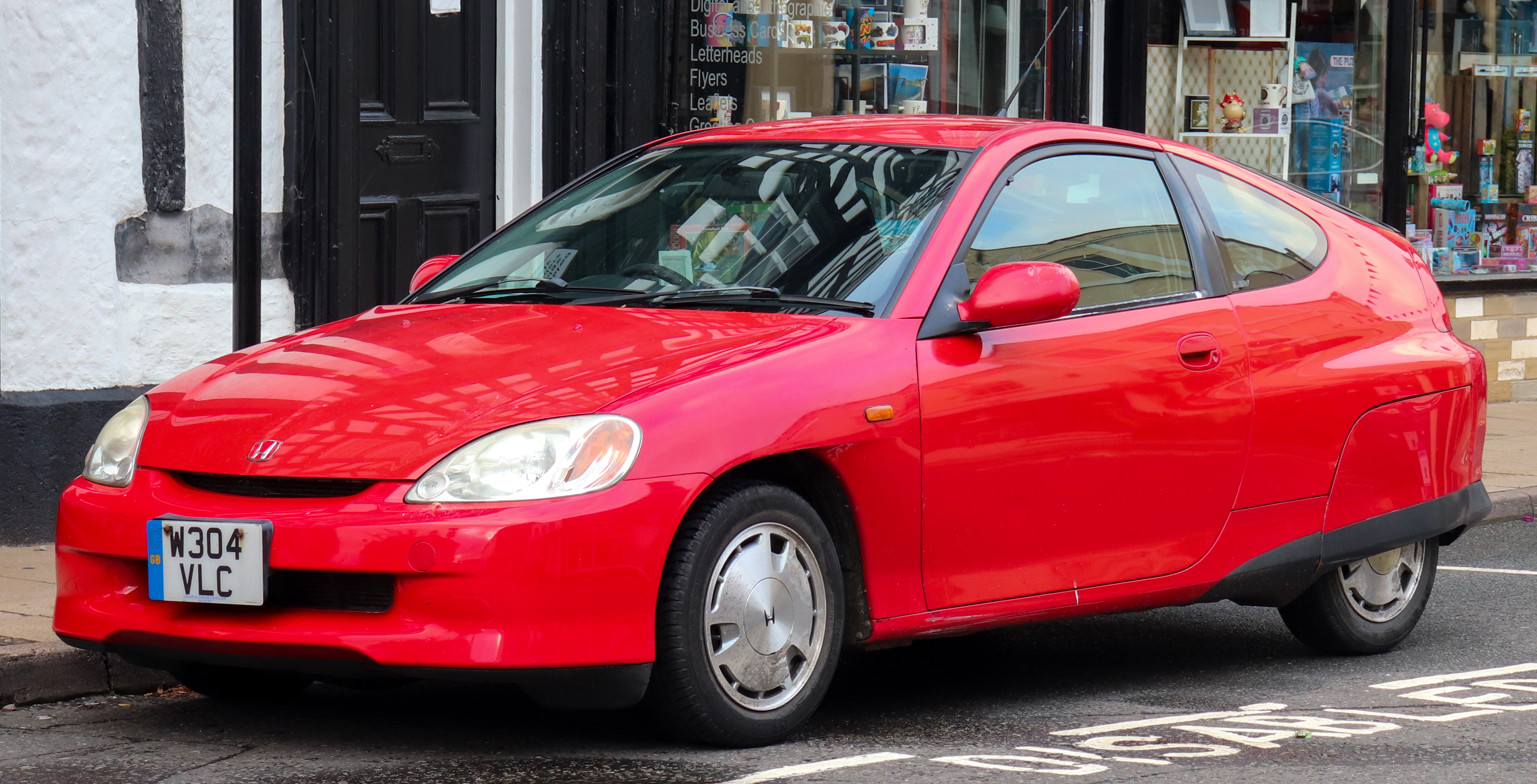
First-generation Honda Insight, the first vehicle to use the IMA system

- Honda J-VX (1997 concept car)
- Honda Insight (1999–2006, 2010–2014)
- Honda Dualnote (2001 concept car)
- Honda Fit Hybrid (2010–2014)
- Honda Fit Shuttle Hybrid (2010–2015)
- Honda Civic Hybrid (2003–2015)
- Honda Accord Hybrid (2005–2007)
- Honda Freed Hybrid (2008–2016)
- Honda CR-Z (2010–2016)
- Acura ILX Hybrid (2013–2014)
