= Honda Small Hybrid Sports Concept =

Motor vehicle by Honda

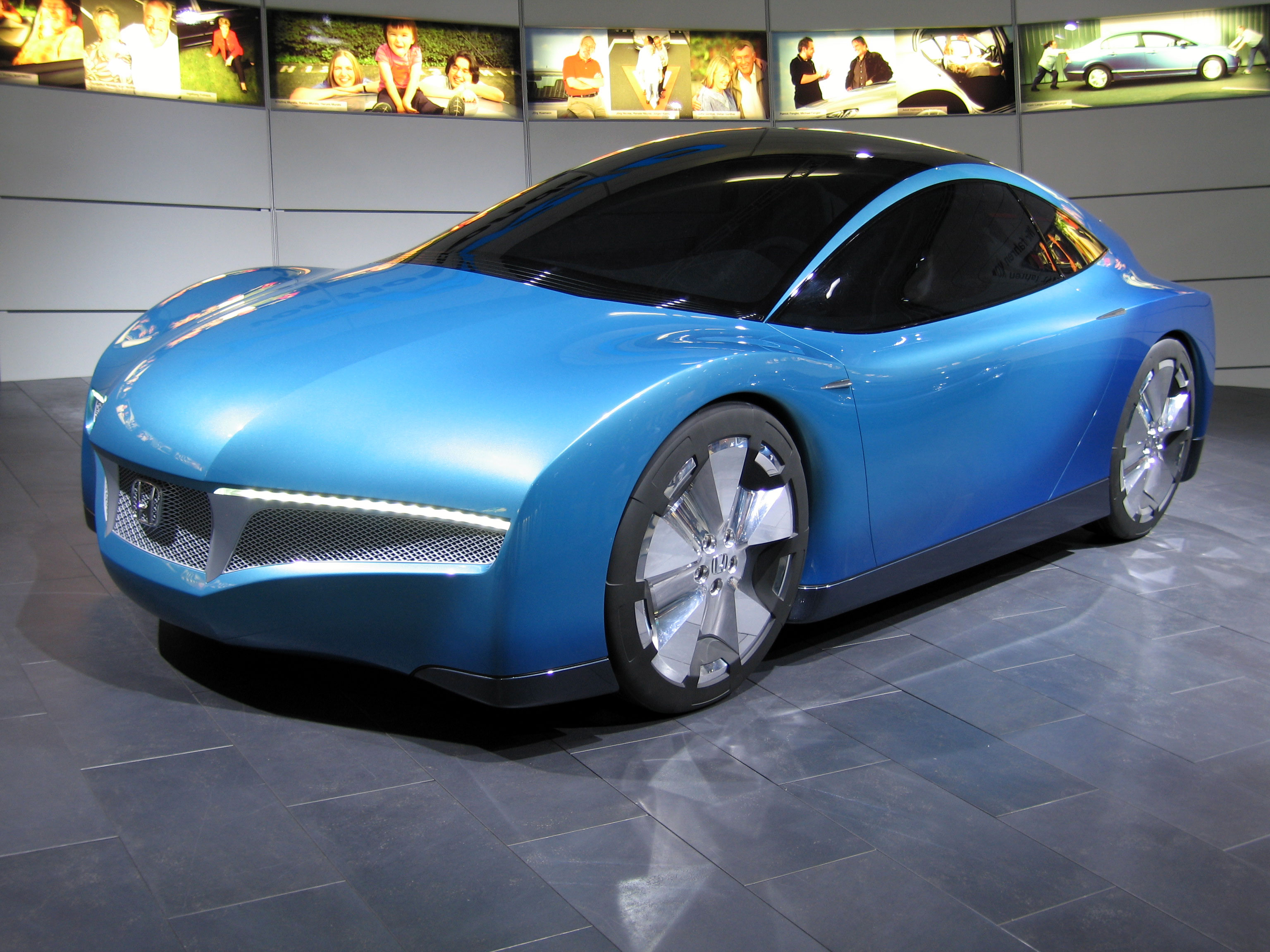

Overview
- Manufacturer: Honda
- Production: 2007

Body and chassis
- Class: Concept car
- Body style: 2-door coupe

Powertrain
- Transmission: CVT

Dimensions
- Wheelbase: 2,350 mm (92.5 in)
- Length: 4,000 mm (157.5 in)
- Width: 1,760 mm (69.3 in)
- Height: 1,270 mm (50.0 in)

Honda Small Hybrid Sports Concept is front-engine, front wheel drive hybrid concept car developed by Honda. The premiere of the concept car took place at the Geneva Motor Show in 2007. The car was designed by the European branch of Honda, based in Offenbach am Main, to combine the idea of a sports car that is efficient and ecological.

The car was supposed to be powered by a hybrid Inline-4 with CVT. The car's suspension was mounted on 20-inch rims with 165/60 tires.

The same year, the Small Hybrid Sports Concept was followed by the Compact Renaissance Zero concept in the 2007 Tokyo Motor show.
