= Honda J-VX =

Overview
- Manufacturer: Honda
- Production: 1997

Body and chassis
- Class: Concept car
- Body style: 3-door hatchback/ sports coupe
- Doors: Scissor

Powertrain
- Engine: 1.0 L VTEC 3-cylinder
- Electric motor: Honda IMA electric motor
- Transmission: CVT

Dimensions
- Wheelbase: 2,360 mm (93 in)
- Length: 3,840 mm (151 in)
- Width: 1,750 mm (69 in)
- Height: 1,255 mm (49.4 in)

The Honda J-VX was the hybrid sports concept car manufactured by Honda. It was the first Honda car to employ the Integrated Motor Assist electric hybrid system and was initially unveiled at the Tokyo Motor Show in October 1997.

It achieved 30 km/L (71 mpg_{‑US}) and featured a 1.0 liter, three-cylinder VTEC engine, supercapacitor electrical storage, an all-glass roof, airbag-like "air belts", used lightweight materials, and aerodynamic design. Eventually, it would evolve into the Honda VV, a pre-production prototype of the Honda Insight.
