= Honda Elysion =

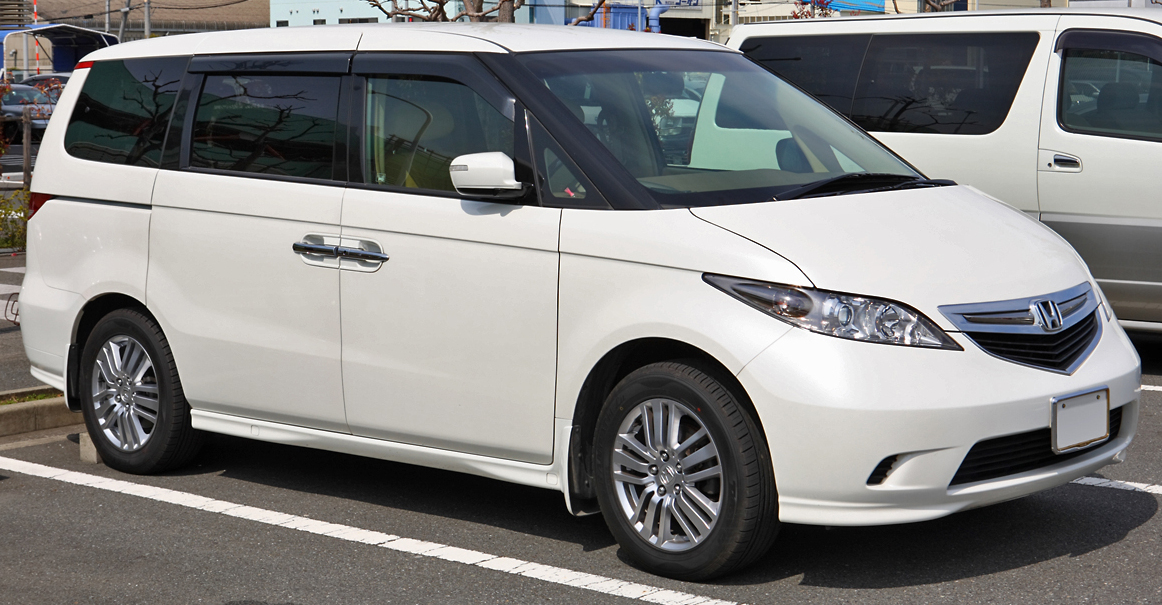

Overview
- Manufacturer: Honda
- Production: 2004–present

Body and chassis
- Class: Minivan
- Body style: 5-door minivan

Chronology
- Predecessor: Honda LaGreat

The Honda Elysion (Japanese: ホンダ・エリシオン, Hepburn: Honda Erishion) is a seven- or eight-seat minivan originally sold in Japan as a competitor to the Toyota Alphard and the Nissan Elgrand. The Honda LaGreat, marketed in the United States as the Honda Odyssey, featured popular styling but was considered impractical in Japan due to its relatively large dimensions. The Elysion was designed with styling cues from the LaGreat but made smaller to be competitive in the Japanese market.

The Elysion was introduced to the Chinese market in June 2012. Japanese production ceased in October 2013, but the model continues to be manufactured and sold in China. Honda derived the vehicle name from Elysium, the paradise of classical Greek mythology.

== First generation (RR; 2004) ==
First generation
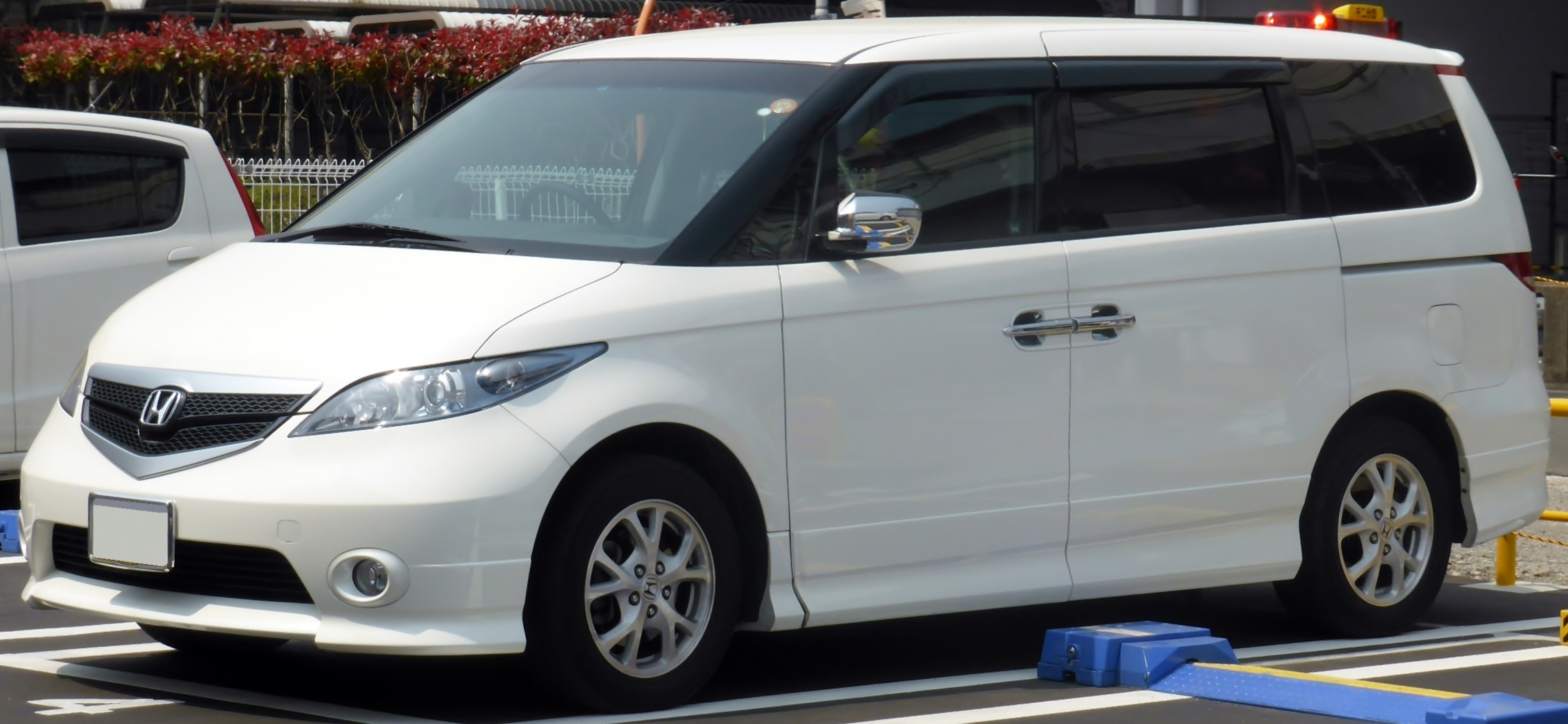
- Elysion G Aero (pre-facelift)

Overview
- Model code: RR1; RR2; RR3; RR4; RR5; RR6
- Production: 2004–2013 (Japan); 2012–2015 (China)
- Assembly: Japan: Sayama, Saitama; China: Wuhan (Dongfeng Honda)
- Designer: Norio Tomobe

Body and chassis
- Layout: Front-engine, front-wheel-drive; Front-engine, four-wheel-drive
- Related: Honda Odyssey (third generation); Honda Accord (Japan and Europe seventh generation)

Powertrain
- Engine: Petrol: 2.4 L K24A I4; 3.0 L J30A V6; 3.5 L J35A V6
- Transmission: 5-speed automatic

Dimensions
- Wheelbase: 2,900 mm (114.2 in)
- Length: 4,920 mm (193.7 in)
- Width: 1,845 mm (72.6 in)
- Height: 1,810 mm (71.3 in)
- Kerb weight: 2,020 kg (4,453 lb)

Chronology
- Successor: Honda Odyssey (fifth generation) (Japan)

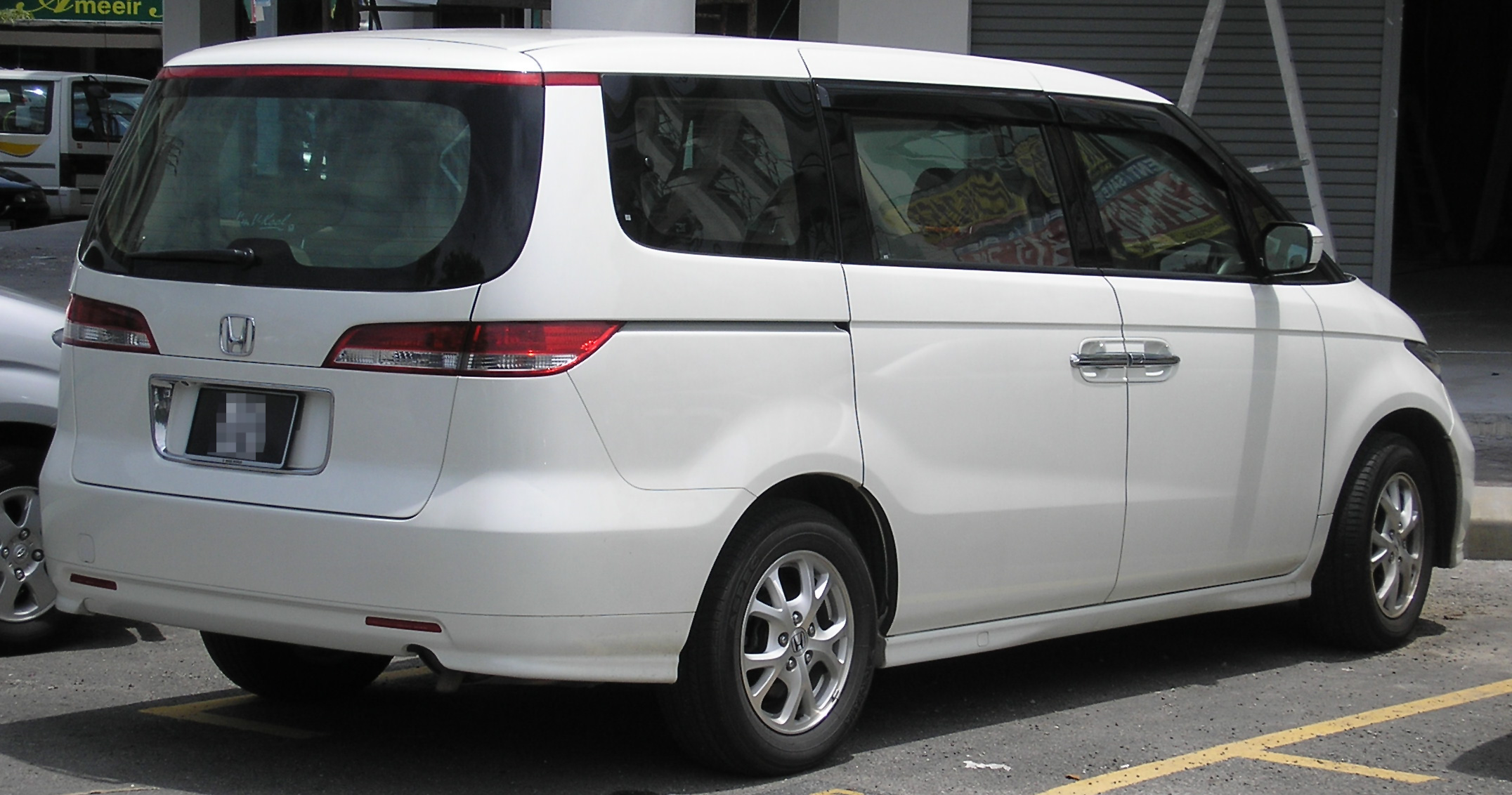
Elysion rear view

The first-generation Elysion was previewed at the 2003 Tokyo Motor Show as the "ASM" concept, and went on sale on 13 May 2004. A mild restyle was introduced on 29 September 2005, adding Aero and VG Premium trim levels. On 13 January 2006, the G Aero HDD Navi and VG HDD Navi Aero editions were introduced. A further styling revision was made on 21 December 2006, accompanied by an interior update.

The Elysion was offered with either a 2.4-litre DOHC direct-injection K24A with i-VTEC producing 160 PS (118 kW; 158 bhp), or a 3.0-litre SOHC J30A V6 with i-VTEC producing 250 PS (184 kW; 247 bhp). The V6 was also available with Variable Cylinder Management (VCM). The top-spec Prestige model used the J35A V6 from the Honda Legend, producing 300 PS (221 kW; 296 bhp) with the option of all-wheel drive; all-wheel-drive variants had power reduced to 279 PS (205 kW; 275 bhp).

=== Concept ===
The Elysion was first shown as the Honda ASM concept at the 2003 Tokyo Motor Show and entered production approximately six months later with revised headlights, a redesigned front grille, and updated interior trim. It was officially launched for the Japanese domestic market in mid-2004.

=== Safety ===
The Elysion body structure combines high-rigidity steel with Honda G-Con technology and a double-platform floor with a low centre of gravity.

The top-specification VZ model is equipped with an intelligent highway cruise control (IHCC) system and a collision mitigation sensor (CMS) using front-mounted millimetre-wave radar to warn the driver of an imminent collision, automatically pre-tensioning the seatbelts and priming the brakes. The radar also provides a night-vision display of objects ahead on the vehicle's 8-inch navigation screen. Additional safety equipment includes ABS, vehicle stability assist (VSA), traction control, sideslip control, and adaptive front-lighting system (AFS) with projector HID headlights.

=== Powertrain ===
The 2.4-litre i-VTEC K24A produces 160 PS (118 kW; 158 bhp) and 218 N⋅m (161 lb⋅ft) of torque, sharing its specification and gearing with the contemporary Odyssey. The 3.0-litre V6 J30A uses VCM to deactivate three cylinders on one bank under light load, with a dashboard ECO indicator illuminating during three-cylinder operation.

All first-generation Elysion models are fitted with ventilated disc brakes at all four corners with ABS and electronic brakeforce distribution (EBD).

=== Trims and specifications ===
Six trim levels are available, along with two special Aero HDD editions. Three 2.4-litre front-wheel-drive trims are offered: M, G, and X. Three 3.0-litre front-wheel-drive trims are also available: VG, VX, and VZ. Four-wheel drive is an option on all models.

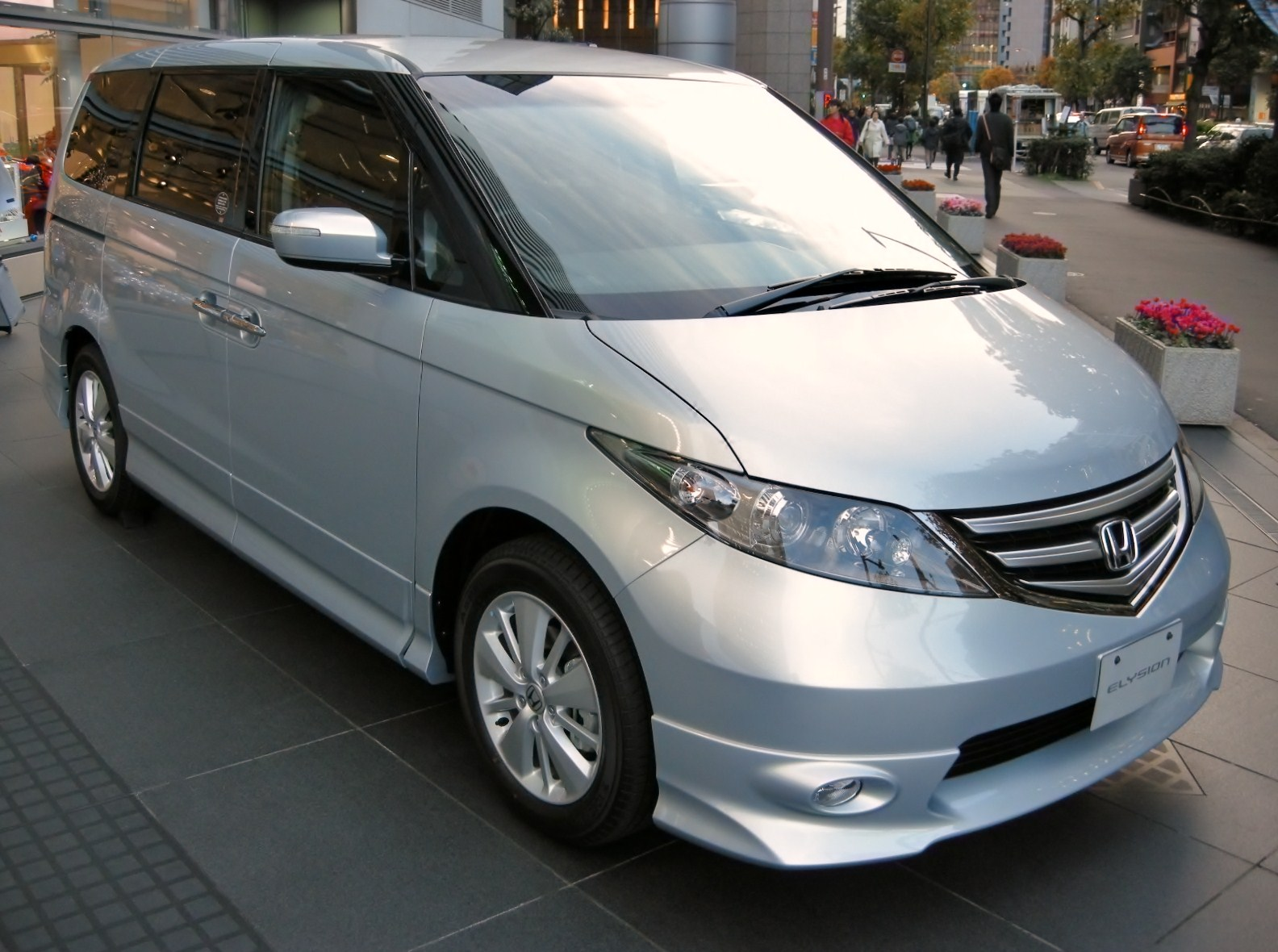
Elysion (facelift)

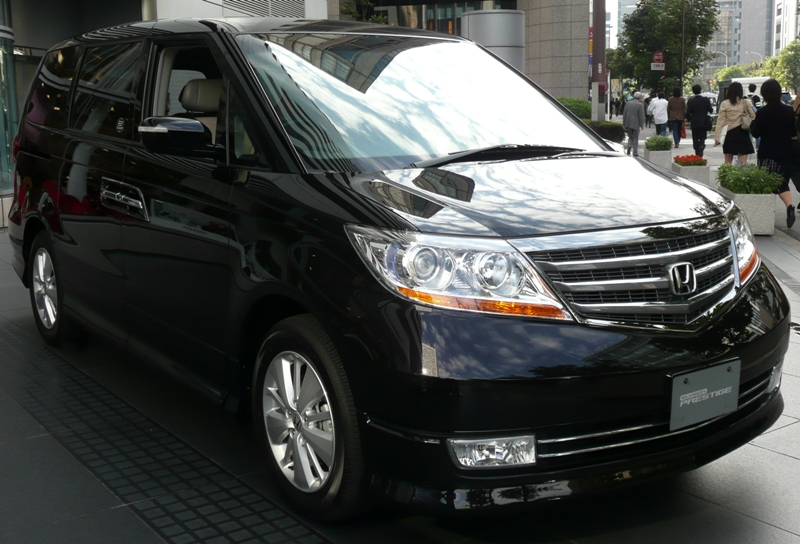
Elysion Prestige

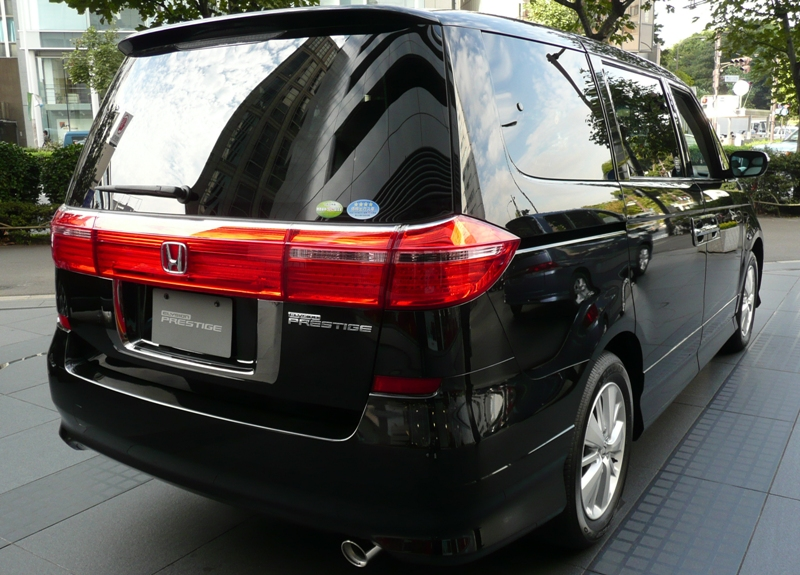
Elysion Prestige rear view

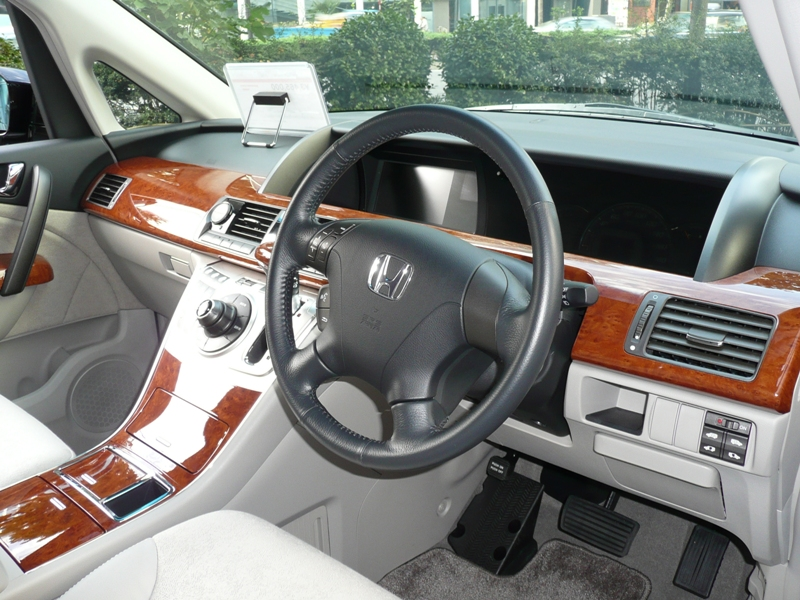
Elysion Prestige interior

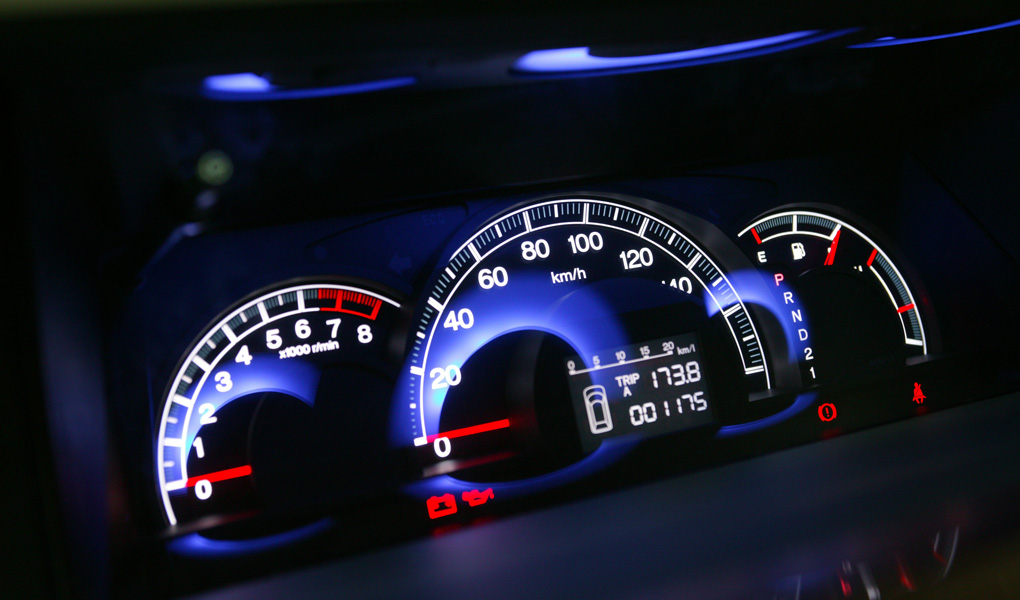
Instrument cluster

=== Chinese market ===
Honda announced the introduction of the Elysion to the Chinese market in 2012. The vehicle was launched on 7 June 2012 with a 2.4-litre i-VTEC K24Z5 engine and five-speed automatic transmission, assembled locally by Honda's Chinese joint venture Dongfeng Honda. It was positioned as a corporate people-mover.

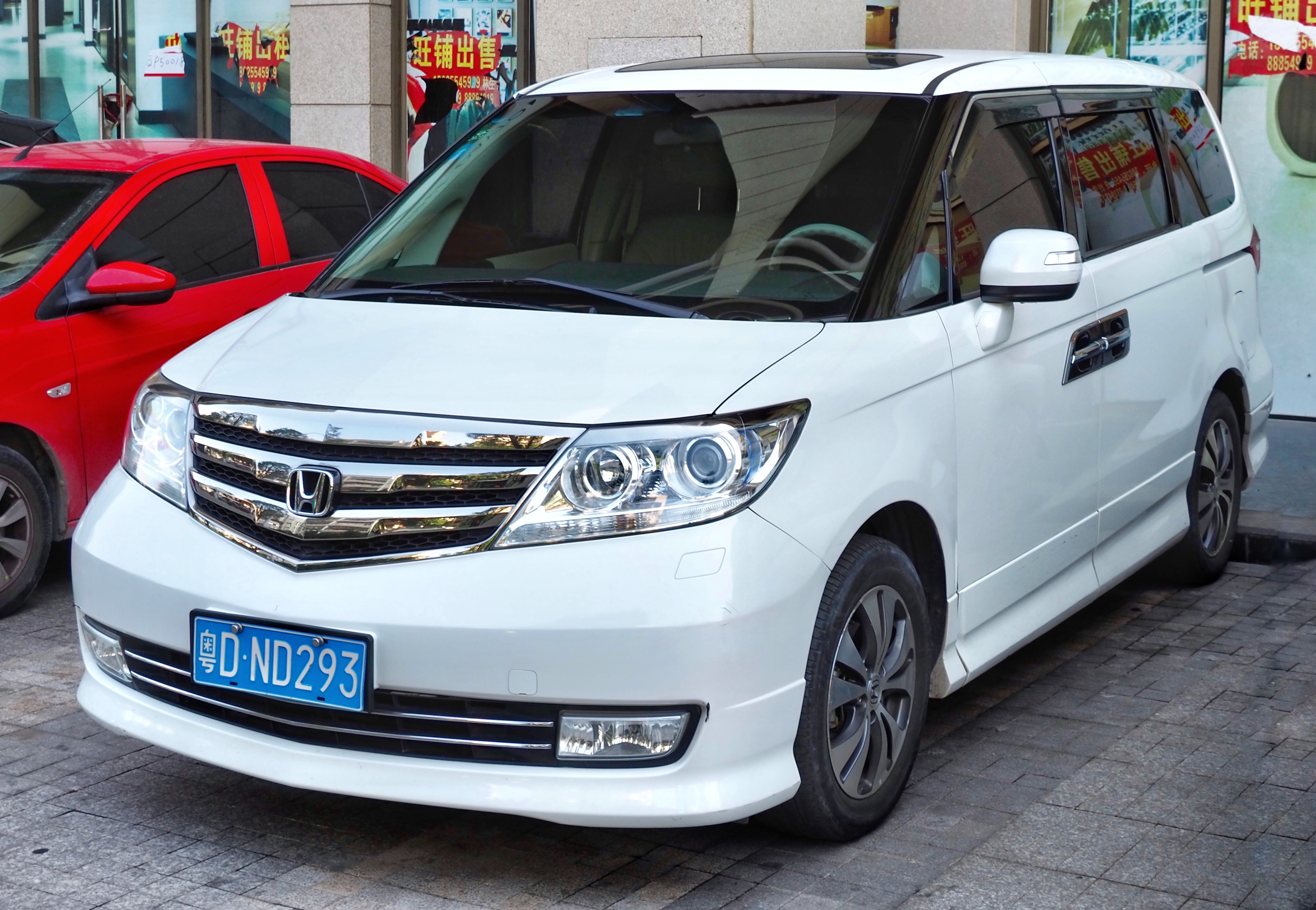
Elysion (China; pre-facelift)

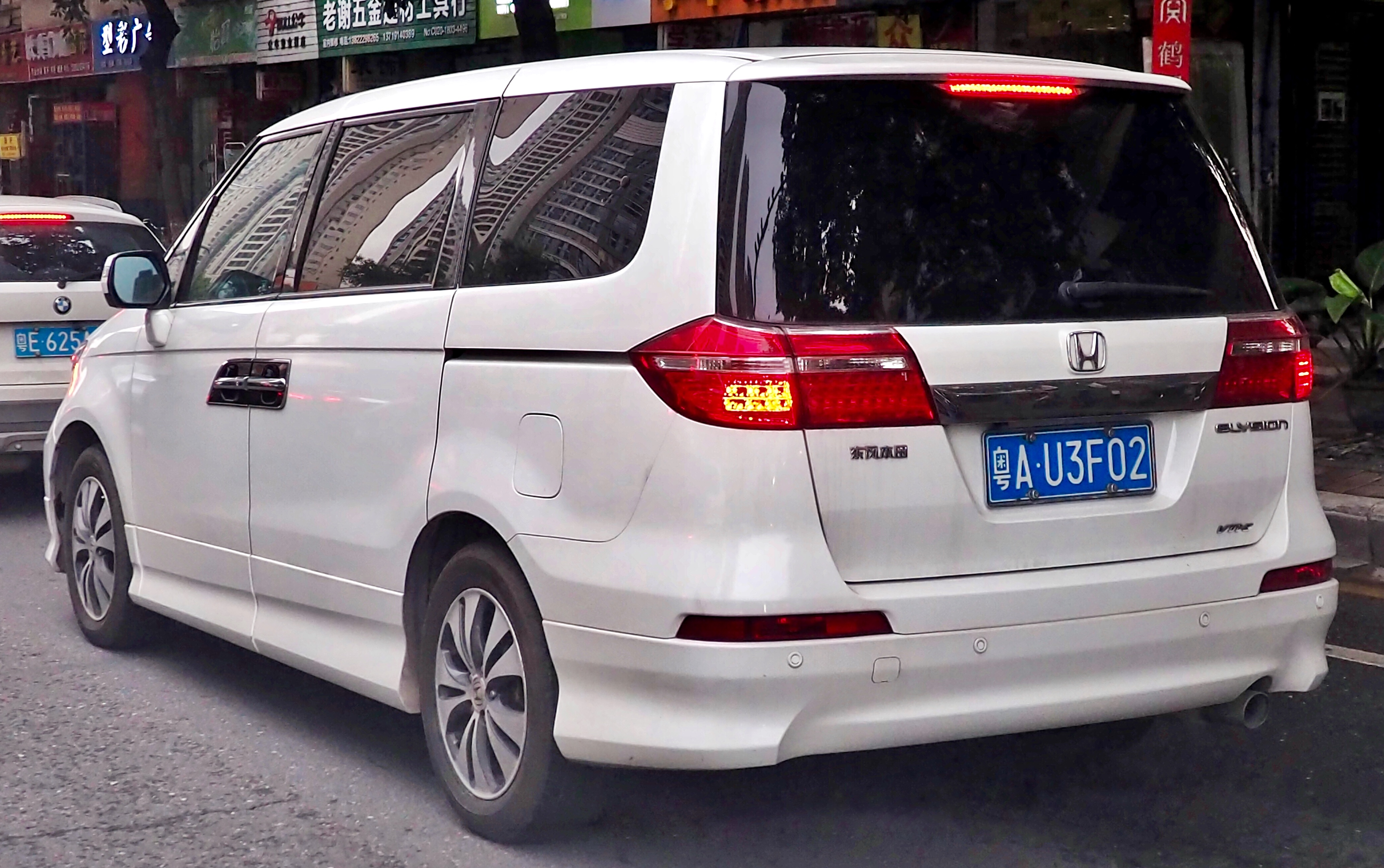
Elysion rear view (China; pre-facelift)

== Second generation (RC; 2015) ==
Second generation
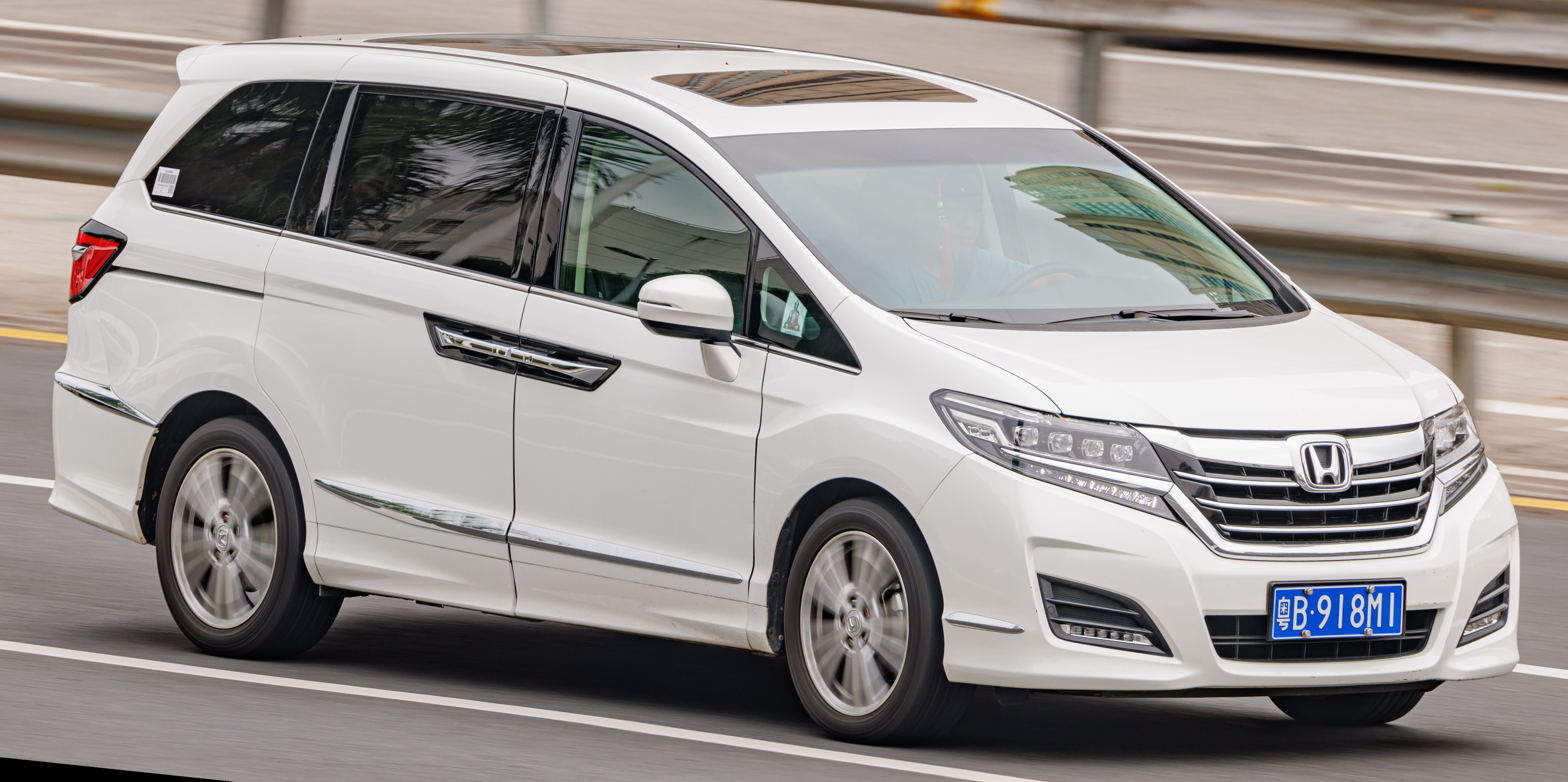

Overview
- Model code: RC1; RC2
- Also called: Honda Odyssey (fifth generation)
- Production: 2015–present
- Assembly: China: Wuhan (Dongfeng Honda)

Body and chassis
- Layout: Front-engine, front-wheel-drive

Powertrain
- Engine: Petrol: 2.0 L LFA1/LFB1/LFA-H4 I4 i-VTEC (hybrid); 2.4 L K24V6 I4
- Electric motor: Permanent magnet synchronous motor (hybrid)
- Transmission: CVT

Dimensions
- Wheelbase: 2,900 mm (114.2 in)
- Length: 4,940 mm (194.5 in)
- Width: 1,845 mm (72.6 in)
- Height: 1,710 mm (67.3 in)

Previewed by the Honda Concept M at the 2013 Shanghai Auto Show, the second-generation Elysion for the Chinese market is based on the fifth-generation Odyssey. It was unveiled at the Guangzhou Auto Show on 20 November 2015 and launched on 9 January 2016. It is 20 mm (0.8 in) longer and 100 mm (3.9 in) lower than the first generation.

The second-generation Elysion is produced and sold exclusively in China by Dongfeng Honda, where it was sold alongside the fifth-generation Odyssey produced by Guangqi Honda.

A hybrid variant went on sale in September 2019, featuring a revised front grille and bumper. The model received a facelift in December 2021, with the hybrid variant redesignated the e:HEV Sport Hybrid.

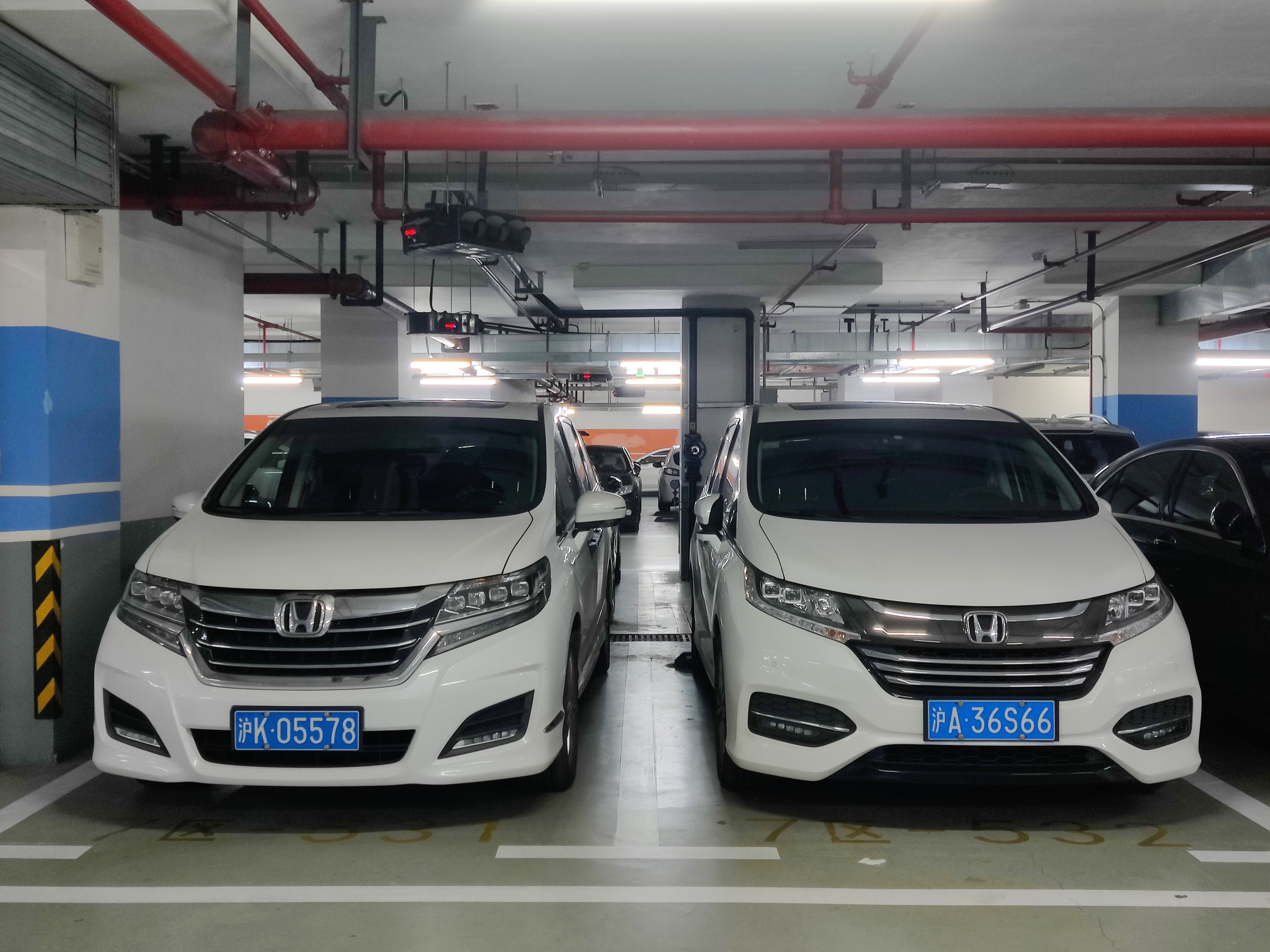
Honda Elysion II and Odyssey V (China)

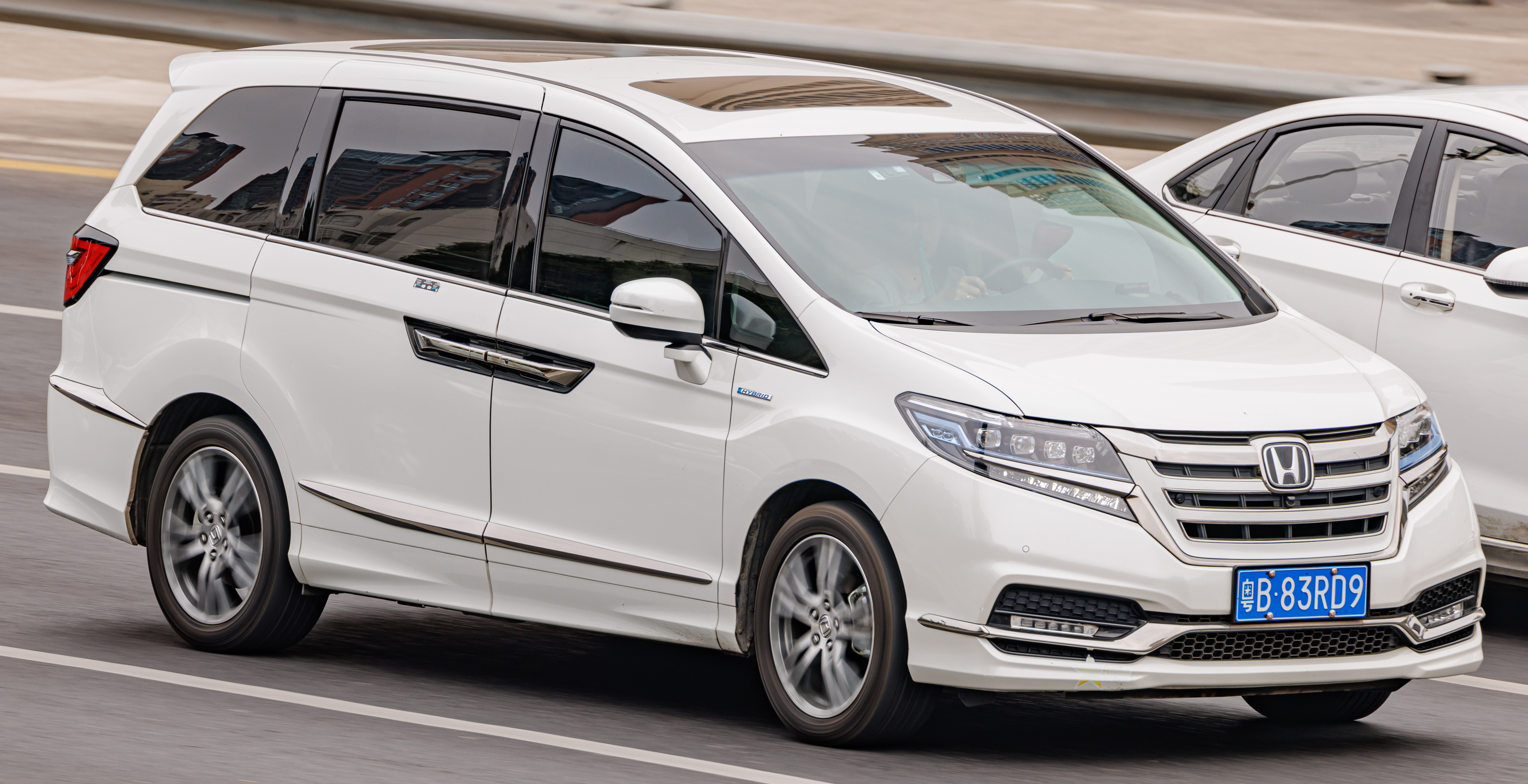
Honda Elysion Hybrid (pre-facelift, China)

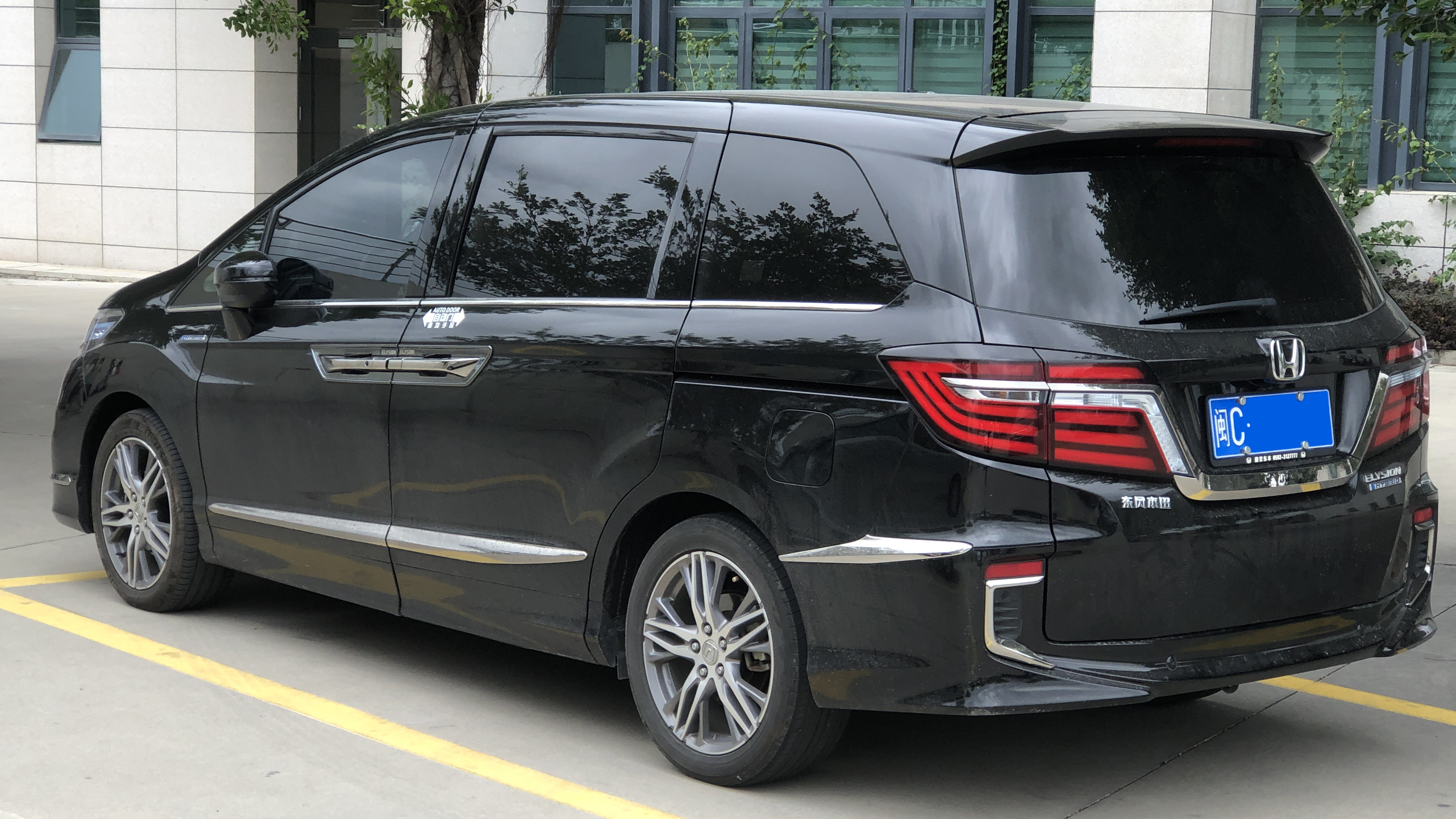
Honda Elysion Hybrid (pre-facelift, China) rear view

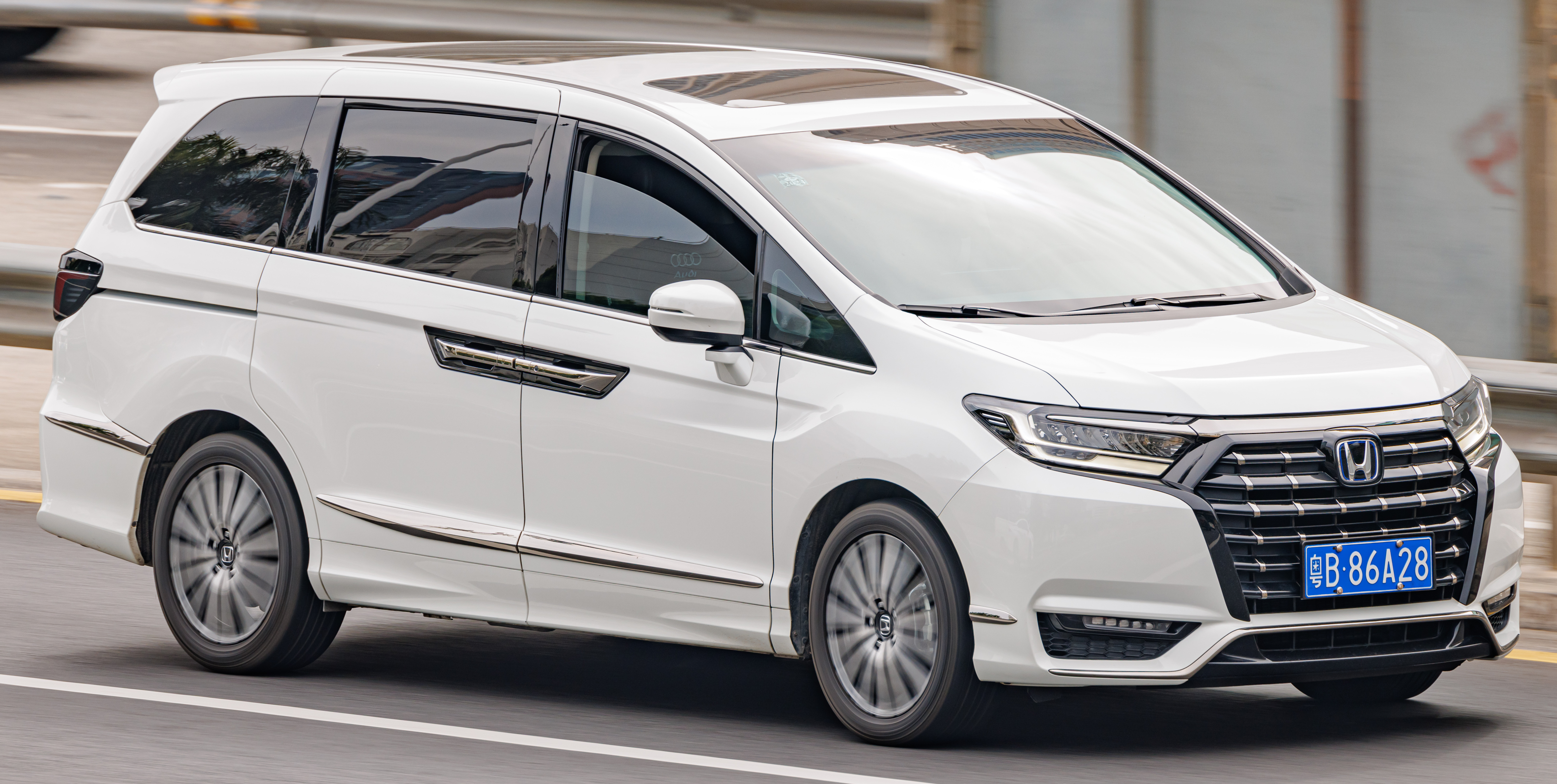
Honda Elysion Hybrid (facelift, China)
