= Hybrid electric vehicles in the United States =

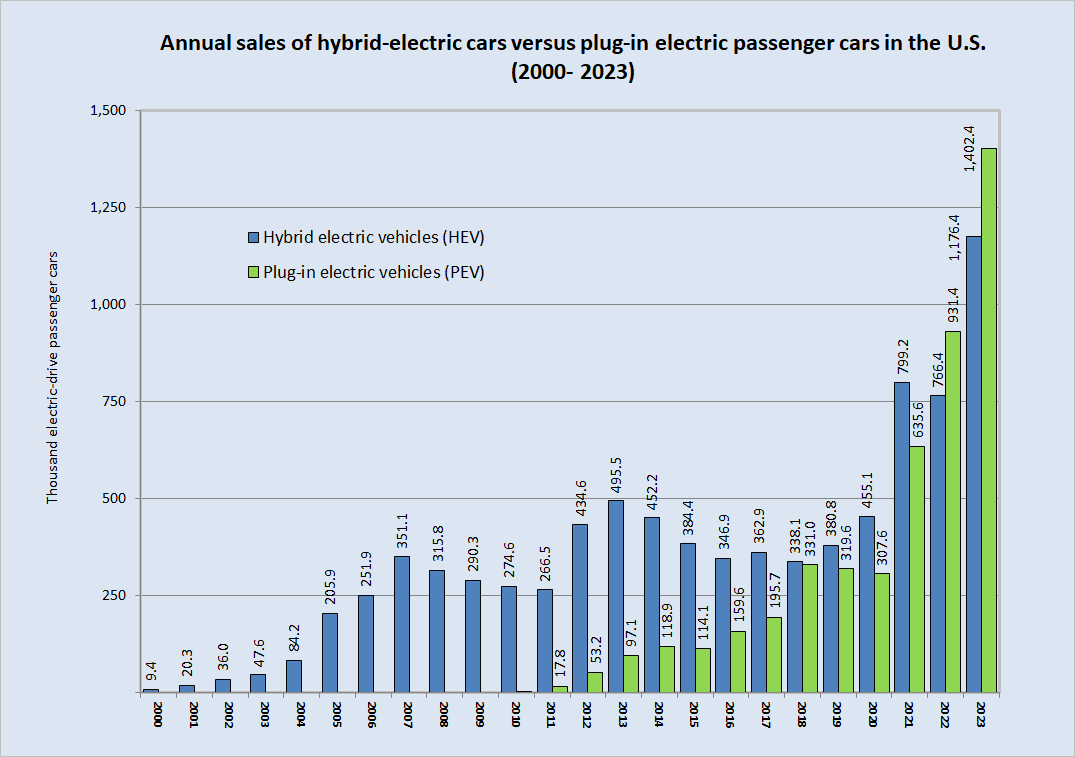
Comparison of annual sales of passenger hybrid electric and plug-in electric vehicles in the U.S. through 2023.

The fleet of hybrid electric vehicles in the United States, with 8.5 million units sold through December 2023, is the second largest in the world after Japan. American sales of hybrid electric vehicles represented about 36% of the global stock of hybrids sold worldwide through April 2016.

Sales of hybrid vehicles in the U.S. began to decline following the 2008 financial crisis, and after a short recovery, reached its peak in 2013 with almost 500,000 units sold and a record market share of 3.19%, but began to decline again in 2014 due to low gasoline prices and increased sales of plug-in electric cars. The market share slightly recovered in 2019 to 2.3%, and 3.2% in 2020. Since their inception in 1999, a total of 5,803,917 hybrid electric automobiles and sport utility vehicles have been sold in the country through 2020.

The top selling hybrid electric vehicle in the country is the conventional Toyota Prius, which has sold 1,643,000 units since 2000 through April 2016, representing a 40.8% market share of all hybrids sold in the U.S. since 1999. Cumulative sales of the Prius nameplate totaled 1,932,805 units delivered through April 2016, representing a 48.0% market share of total hybrid sales in the U.S.

California has been the state leading hybrid sales in the U.S., followed by New York and Florida. In terms of new hybrids sold per capita, the District of Columbia was the leader. From January to July 2013, the three cities with the highest electric drive car registrations, including hybrids, all-electric cars and plug-in hybrids, were all located in California: Atherton (19.4%) and Los Altos (16.1%) in the Silicon Valley, followed by Santa Monica (15.0%), located in Los Angeles County.

Purchases from the Obama administration occurring for 25% of Ford and General Motors hybrid-electric vehicles sold between January 2009 and late 2010. During this period hybrids accounted for about 10% of the 145,473 vehicles bought by the U.S. General Services Administration.

== Markets and sales ==
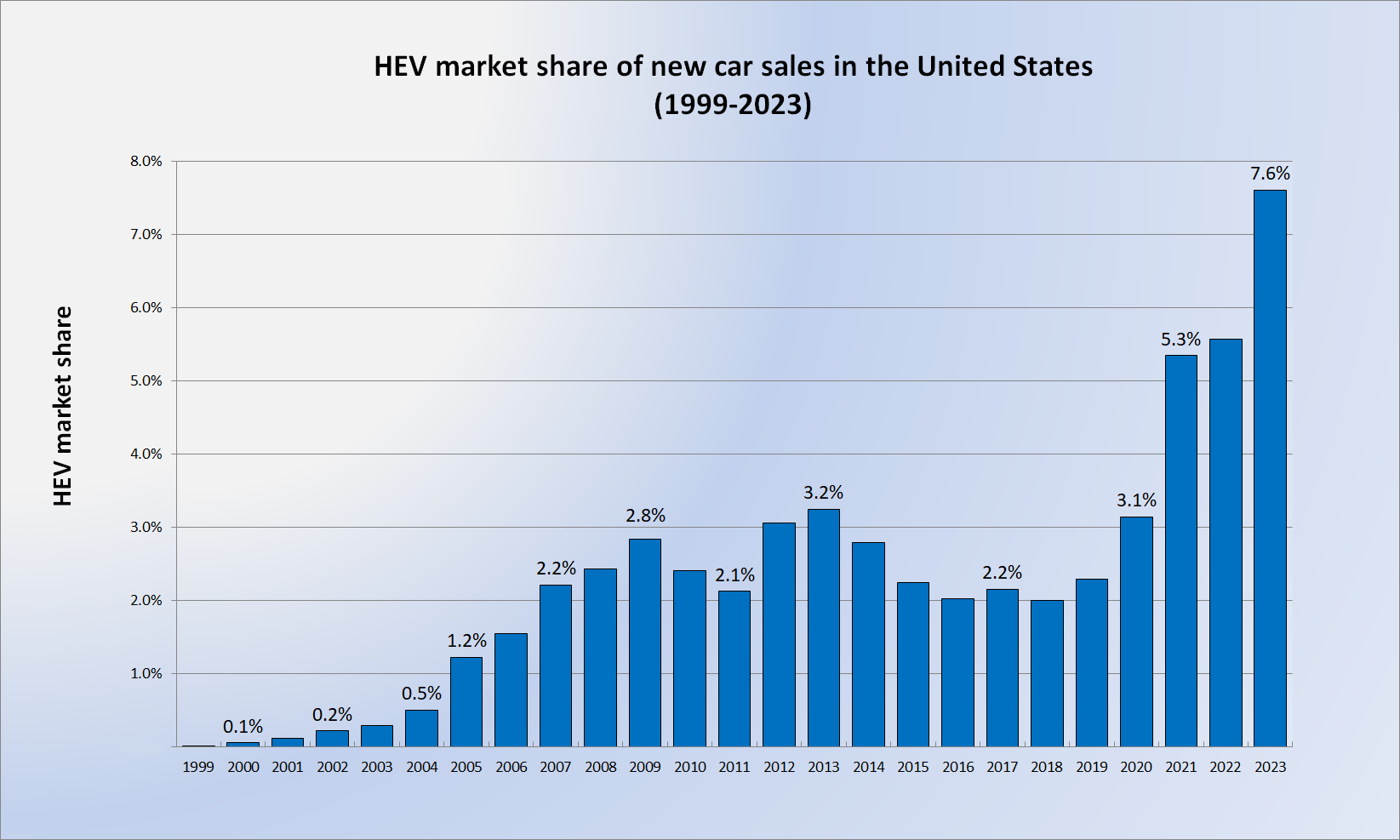
HEV market share of new car sales in the U.S. between 1999 and 2023.

The market of hybrid electric vehicles in the United States is the second largest in the world after Japan with cumulative sales of 5.4 million units through December 2019. American sales of hybrid electric vehicles represented about 36% of the stock of hybrids sold worldwide through April 2016. Cumulative hybrid car sales in the American market passed the 1 million milestone in 2007, the 2 million mark in May 2011, the 3 million milestone in October 2013, and 4 million in April 2016, allowing the U.S. to rank as the world's second largest hybrid market after Japan.

Sales of hybrid vehicles in the U.S. began to decline following the 2008 financial crisis, and after a short recovery, began to decline again in 2014 due to low gasoline prices, and had a small rebound in 2019. Hybrid sales in the American market achieved its highest market share ever in 2013, capturing 3.19% of new carsales that year. At the end of 2015 the hybrid take rate had fallen to 2.21%, dropped to 1.99% in 2016, slightly recovered to 2.4% in 2019.

A total of 5,374,000 hybrid electric automobiles and sport utility vehicles (SUVs) have been sold in the country through December 2019. Sales are led by the Toyota Prius, which passed the 1 million mark in April 2011, and has sold 1,643,000 units since 2000 through April 2016, representing a 40.8% market share of all hybrids sold in the U.S. since their inception in 1999. The Toyota Prius family is the market leader with 1,932,805 units sold through April 2016, representing a 48.0% market share of total hybrid sales in the U.S. Out of the 9.0145 million hybrids sold worldwide by Toyota Motor Company through April 2016, the United States accounted for 44.7% of TMC global hybrid sales.

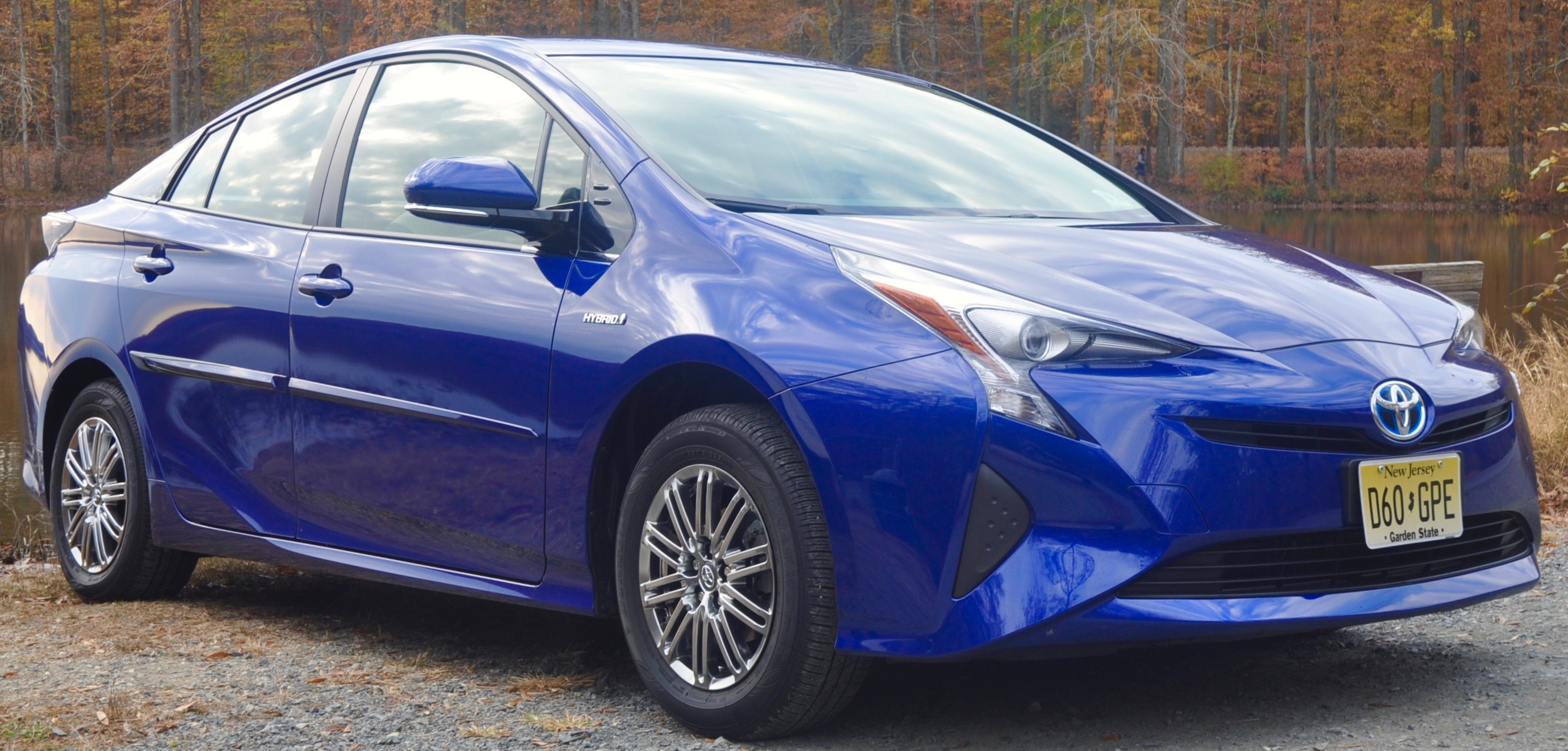
The Toyota Prius is the top selling hybrid car in the U.S., with more than 1.6 million units sold since 2000 thru April 2016.

Sales of Prius family vehicles in California represented 26% of all Prius purchases in the U.S. during 2012. With 60,688 units sold during this year, the Prius became the best selling nameplate in California, ahead of the previous leader, the Honda Civic (57,124 units) and the third ranked, the Toyota Camry (50,250 units). Again in 2013, the Prius nameplate was the best selling vehicle in California with 69,728 units sold in the state, ahead of the Honda Civic (66,982) and the Honda Accord (63,194). Nationwide, the best selling vehicle in 2013 was the Ford F-Series pickup, which has been the best selling vehicle for more than three decades.

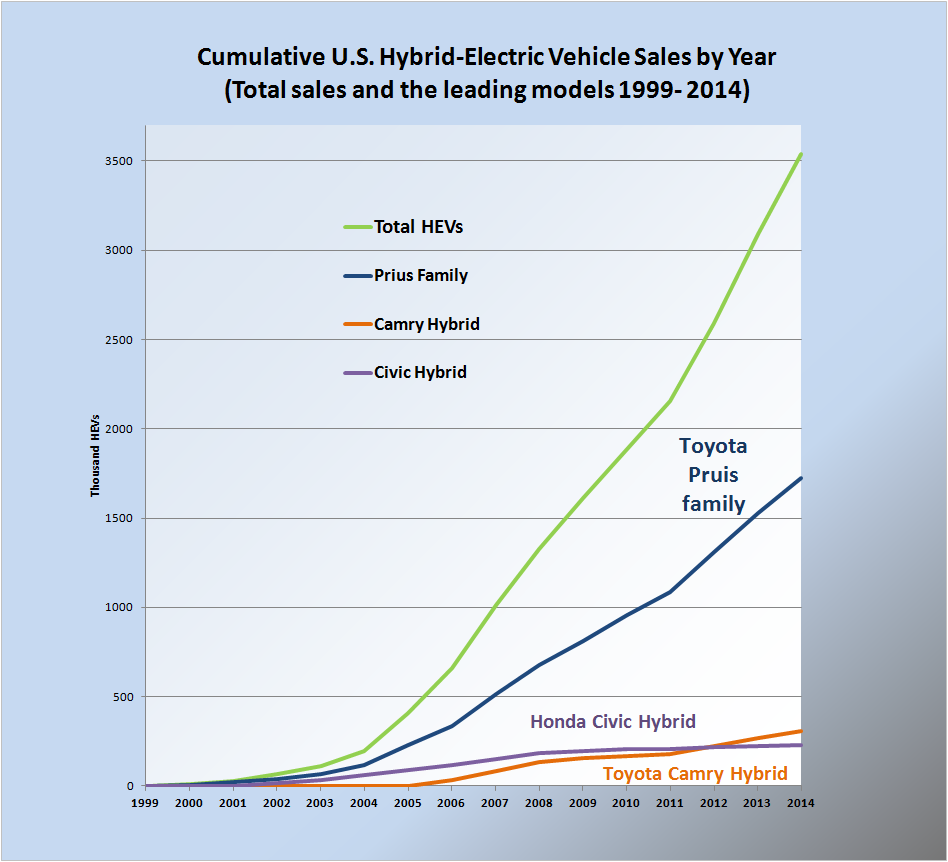
Historical trend of U.S. cumulative HEV sales from 1999 to 2014.

As of April 2016, sales of the conventional Prius are followed by the Toyota Camry Hybrid, with 345,640 units sold since 2006, the Honda Civic Hybrid, with cumulative sales of 234,610 vehicles since 2002, the Ford Fusion Hybrid with 166,341 units since 2009, and the Toyota Prius c with 165,075 units since 2012. Among the hybrids built by American manufacturers, the siblings Lincoln MKZ/Mercury Milan/Fusion Hybrids rank first, with combined sales of 200,899 units since 2009 through 2015, followed by the Ford Escape Hybrid and its sibling the Mercury Mariner Hybrid with combined sales of 130,803 vehicles between 2004 and 2012, when the hybrid lineup was discontinued. Ranking next is the Ford C-Max Hybrid, with 72,330 units sold since 2012 through 2015, and the Chevrolet Malibu Hybrid with 38,204 units since 2008.

2012

A total of 434,498 hybrid electric vehicles were sold during 2012, and the hybrid market share of total new car sales in the country was 3.0%, up from 2.1% in 2011. The top five selling hybrids during 2012 were the Toyota Prius liftback (147,503), the second generation Camry Hybrid (45,626), Prius v (1,669), Prius c (35,733), and the Hyundai Sonata Hybrid (20,754). Toyota sold 223,905 Priuses among the various HEV family members in the U.S. in 2012, representing together a market share of 51.5% of all hybrid sold in the country that year.

2013

During 2013 hybrid sales totaled 495,685 units, up 14.1% from 2012 and representing a market share of 3.19% of new car sales. The top five selling hybrids during this period were the conventional Prius (145,172), second generation Camry Hybrid (44,448), Prius c (41,979), second generation Fusion Hybrid (37,270), and the Prius v (34,989). Combined Prius family vehicles reached 222,140 units representing a market share of 44.8%, down from 51.5% in the year 2012, while Ford Motor Company increased its market share of the conventional hybrid market from 7.5% in 2012 to 14.7% in 2013.

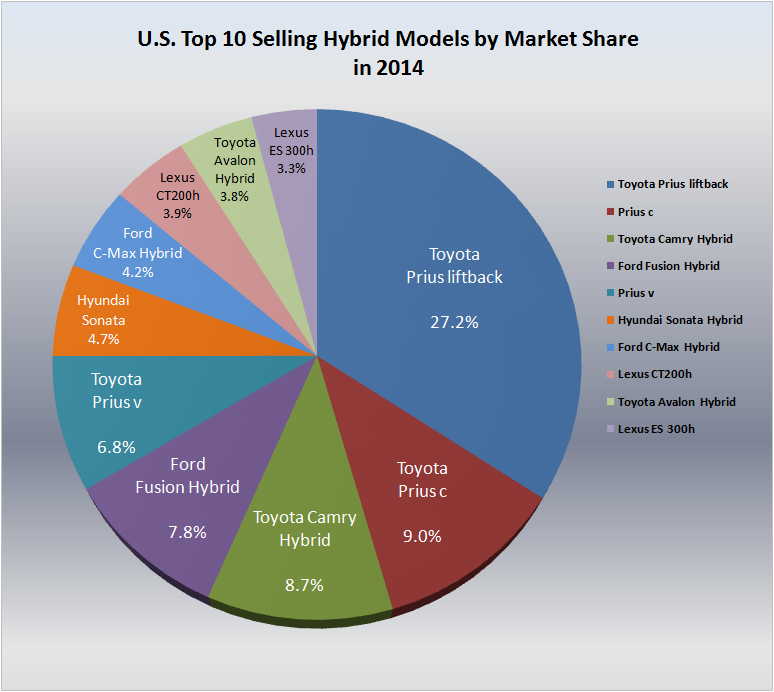
Market share of U.S. top 10 selling HEV models in 2014.

Ford experienced record sales of its hybrids models in the U.S. during 2013, with 72,795 units sold, almost triple the 2012 total. During the second quarter of 2013 Ford achieved its best hybrid sales quarter ever, up 517% over the same quarter of 2012. In 2013 Toyota's hybrid market share in the U.S. declined from 2012 totals due to new competition, particularly from Ford with the arrival of new products such as the C-Max Hybrid and the new styling of the Fusion. Except for the Prius c, sales of the other models of the Prius family and the Camry Hybrid suffered a decline from 2012, while the Fusion Hybrid experienced a 164.3% increased from 2012, and C-Max Hybrid sales climbed 156.6%.

2014

Hybrid sales totaled 452,152 units, down 8.8% from the previous year. The hybrid market share was 2.75% of new car sales, down from 3.19% in 2013, and the lowest since 2011. The best selling Prius Liftback was down 15.4% from 2013, driving the decline in sales of the segment. The top five selling hybrids in 2014 were the conventional Prius (122,776), Prius c (40,570), second generation Camry Hybrid (39,515), second generation Fusion Hybrid (35,405), and the Prius v (30,762), all down from the previous year. Combined Prius family vehicles reached 194,108 units representing a market share of 42.9%, down from 44.8% the previous year. Some of the few models with a significant growth in their year-to-year sales were the Honda Accord Hybrid, Infiniti Q50 Hybrid, Nissan Pathfinder Hybrid, and the Chevrolet Impala eAssist.

=== Geographical distribution ===
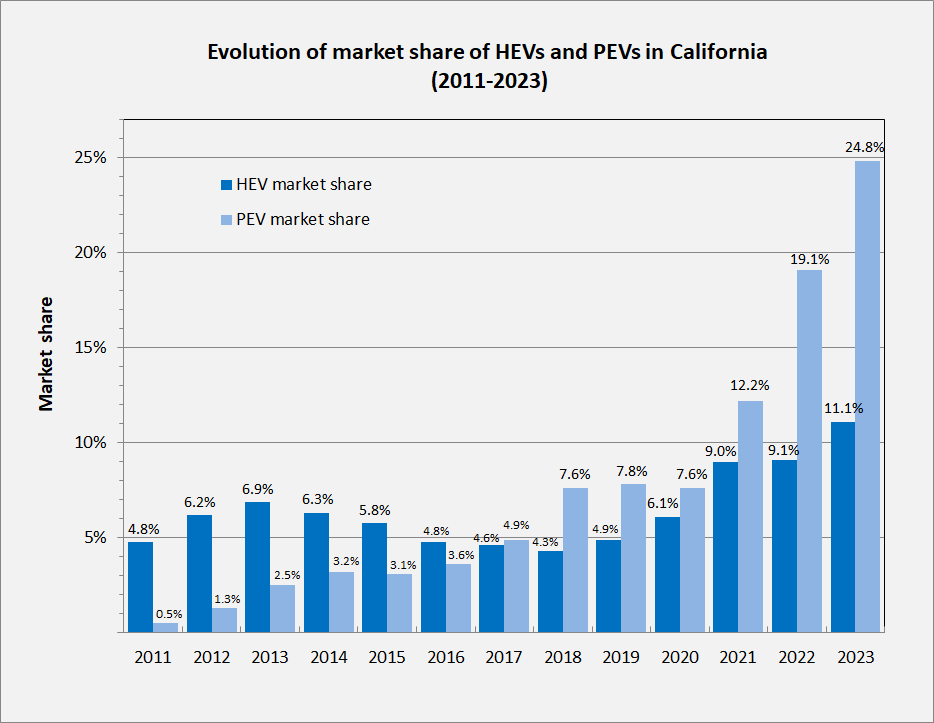
Historical evolution of the market share of sales of hybrid electric vehicles and plug-in electric cars in California (2011-2023).

California has been the state leading hybrid sales in the U.S. with 55,553 vehicles sold in 2009, 74,932 in 2008, and 91,417 in 2007. In 2009 it was followed by New York (15,438) and Florida (14,949). In terms of new hybrids sold per capita, the District of Columbia was the leader in 2009 with 3.79 hybrids per 1000 residents, followed by California (1.54) and Washington (1.53). The top 5 U. S. metropolitan area markets for sales of hybrid electric vehicles in 2009 were Los Angeles (26,677), New York (21,193), San Francisco (15,799), Washington, D.C. (11,595), and Chicago (8,990). From January to July 2013, the three cities with the highest electric drive car registrations, including hybrids, all-electric cars and plug-in hybrids, were all located in California: Atherton (19.4%) and Los Altos (16.1%) in the Silicon Valley, followed by Santa Monica (15.0%), located in Los Angeles County.

The top 5 U. S. metropolitan area markets for sales of hybrid electric vehicles in 2009 were Los Angeles (26,677), New York (21,193), San Francisco (15,799), Washington, D.C. (11,595), and Chicago (8,990). The following table summarizes the top metropolitan area markets in terms of new hybrids sold per capita.

Top U.S. metropolitan markets for hybrid electric vehicles in 2008-2009
Rank; 2009	Metropolitan; Area	New registered hybrids per 1000 households (2009)	Rank; 2008	Metropolitan; Area	New registered hybrids per 1000 households (2008)
1	Portland, OR	8.8	1	Portland, OR	12.17
2	Helena, MT	6.7	2	San Francisco, CA	8.84
3	San Francisco, CA	6.7	3	Monterey, CA	7.16
4	Washington, DC	5.1	4	Santa Barbara, CA	6.94
5	Los Angeles, CA	4.8	5	San Diego, CA	6.57
6	San Diego, CA	4.7	6	Los Angeles, CA	6.08
7	Seattle, WA	4.7	7	Charlottesville, VA	5.42
8	Juneau, AK	4.6	8	Seattle, WA	4.90
9	Santa Barbara, CA	4.4	9	Washington, DC	4.85
10	Monterey, CA	4.3	10	Sacramento, CA	4.85
U.S. metropolitan area average		1.8	U.S. metropolitan area average		2.18

Considering hybrid sales between January 2010 through September 2011, the top selling metropolitan region was the San Francisco Bay Area, with 8.4% of all new cars sold during that period, followed by Monterey-Salinas with 6.9%, and Eugene, Oregon, with 6.1%. The following seven top selling markets are also on the West Coast, including Seattle-Tacoma and Los Angeles with 5.7%, San Diego with 5.6%, and Portland with 5.4%. The Washington D.C. Metro Area, with 4.2%, is the next best selling region out of the West Coast.

== See also ==
- Alternative fuel vehicle
- Comparison of Toyota hybrids
- Electric car
- Flexible-fuel vehicles in the United States
- Green vehicle
- Government incentives for fuel efficient vehicles in the United States
- Hydrogen vehicle
- Plug-in electric vehicle
- Plug-in electric vehicles in California
- Plug-in electric vehicles in the United States
- Plug-in hybrid
