= Government incentives for fuel efficient vehicles in the United States =

The U.S. Energy Policy Act of 2005 established a federal income tax credit of up to $3,400 for the purchase of new hybrid vehicles, purchased or placed into service after December 31, 2005. Vehicles purchased after December 31, 2010 are not eligible for this credit. The law limited the tax credits to the first 60,000 eligible vehicles per carmaker, meaning that credits for popular models will be phase out before the tax break's scheduled expiration date. Note these are credits — dollar for dollar tax savings — not merely deductions. The tax credit is to be phased out two calendar quarters after the manufacturer reaches 60,000 new cars sold in the following manner: it will be reduced to 50% if delivered in either the third or fourth quarter after the threshold is reached, to 25% in the fifth and sixth quarters, and 0% thereafter. The Internal Revenue Service is responsible for certifying that certain passenger autos and light trucks qualify for the credit and the amount of the credit.

Some state governments in the U.S. have introduced special provisions for hybrid vehicles driving in carpool (HOV) lanes.

== Tax incentives ==
=== Energy Policy Act of 2005 ===
The Energy Policy Act of 2005 created incentives to encourage the purchase of low emission vehicles. The Energy Independence and Security Act of 2007 expanded these incentives to include emerging electric vehicle, and plug in hybrid, technology. The Energy Improvement and Extension Act of 2008 only acted to push back tax credit-claiming deadlines and include more electric vehicles in existing incentive programs. Many speculated that more recent stimulus legislation would greatly expand existing incentive programs, but the legislation failed to include such provisions. When passed, the American Recovery and Reinvestment Act of 2009 focused more on green infrastructure than personal transportation incentives. The act did allocate money, however, to equip government agencies with more efficient vehicles, created a grant program for diesel owners wishing to outfit their cars with cleaner burning technology, and added a significant tax incentive program for plug-in hybrids.

The tax incentives that are the result of the Energy Policy Act of 2005 are offered to make pricier, but more environmentally friendly vehicles more appealing. Because the process of manufacturing many low emission vehicles (LEV), for example, a hybrid engine, is more technology intensive, and therefore more expensive, than the process of manufacturing a standard gasoline engine, the up-front cost of a hybrid automobile is greater than that of a car with comparable performance. Many potential buyers will require economic incentive to purchase a more expensive LEV over an automobile that runs on gasoline, so a tax credit is offered to effectively cheapen the LEV and encourage the purchase of more environmentally friendly automobiles.

The characteristics and availability of an offered tax credit will vary based on the characteristics and popularity of the car in question, respectively. The size of the offered tax credit typically corresponds in value to the amount of money that the technology in question adds to the manufacture price of the car. For example, hydrogen fuel cell vehicles that are in the early stages of development are more expensive and receive a larger tax credit than a diesel car that is cheaper to make. Existing incentive programs are also set to phase out after a given maker sells 60,000 hybrid vehicles, so more popular models like the Toyota Prius are no longer subject to a tax credit.

Incentives may also vary based on how well the car in question performs in these “green” categories. For example, the buyer of a Tesla Roadster, a fully electric vehicle, will receive a much larger tax credit than the buyer of a standard hybrid, which will pollute much more during its lifespan. The federal government now lists models that are pre-approved to receive a tax credit; some other models may qualify on an ad hoc basis.

=== US Department of Energy's Tax Credit Requirements ===
The Department of Energy has specific requirements that car manufactures must meet, in order to receive tax credits from the government.

- The Vehicle must be made by a manufacturer, and cannot be a previously purchased vehicle that has been converted into a Hybrid.
- The Vehicle must be treated as a motor vehicle for it to fall under title II of the clean air act.
- The Vehicle must be propelled to a significant extent by electricity. Must have a battery with the capacity of 4 kilowatt hours or more. The battery must also be capable of being recharged from an external source of electricity.

Vehicles that have already been certified can qualify for the tac credit by meeting these additional requirements.

- The vehicle must be new, and the original use for the vehicle by the taxpayer receiving the credit should not change.
- The tax credit will only be given to the original purchaser of the vehicle, and not to a secondhand owner. If the vehicle is being lease, the tax credit can be claimed by the leasing company alone.
- The vehicle must be used mostly in the United States.
- The vehicle must be placed in service by the taxpayer by 2010 or later.

=== Classifications for tax credit certified vehicles ===
- Diesel: Because diesel engines are typically more fuel efficient, and can run on cleaner blends of diesel fuel, diesel powered car buyers qualify for federal tax credits. Many Volkswagen diesel models are currently pre-approved for a tax credit of between $1,000 and $1,700. Because diesels are less common in the U.S. than standard gasoline cars, there are many more remaining tax credits for these Volkswagen models than there are for popular hybrid models like the Toyota Prius.
- Alternative fuel vehicles: Currently the only pre-approved alternative fuel vehicle is the Honda Civic GX, which runs on compressed natural gas (CNG), a fossil fuel that burns cleaner than standard gasoline. Currently the standard credit for a qualified alternative fuel vehicle is $4,000. Other than the Civic GX, a number of models produced after 2004 may qualify for tax credits.
- Electric vehicles: Government tax credit programs are planned for electric and plug-in hybrid vehicles, but no specific models have yet been certified.

=== Phase out credits ===
The 60,000-vehicle cap applies to all nameplates across an automaker's business, and as such, Lexus hybrids are accounted as part of Toyota Motor Company production, or Mercury hybrids are part of Ford Motor Company hybrid production. As of mid-2010 three auto manufactures have reached the 60,000 cap, Toyota reached it in 2007, Honda in 2008, and as of April 1, 2010, all Ford hybrid vehicles are also no longer eligible for tax credits.

The new qualified plug-in electric vehicle credit phases out for a PEV manufacturer over the one-year period beginning with the second calendar quarter after the calendar quarter in which at least 200,000 qualifying vehicles from that manufacturer have been sold for use in the United States. For this purpose cumulative sales are accounted after December 31, 2009. Qualifying PEVs are eligible for 50% of the credit if acquired in the first two quarters of the phase-out period, and 25% of the credit if bought in the third or fourth quarter of the phase-out period.^{[179]} Both the Nissan Leaf electric vehicle and the Chevrolet Volt plug-in hybrid, launched in December 2010, are eligible for the maximum $7,500 tax credit.^{[182]} The Toyota Prius Plug-in Hybrid, released in January 2012, is eligible for a $2,500 tax credit due to its smaller battery capacity of 5.2 kWh.^{[183]} All Tesla Motors cars are eligible for the 7,500 tax credit.

=== Historical credit rankings ===
Hybrid tax credits from lowest to highest:

- 2006–07 Chevrolet Silverado Hybrid 2wd, $250
- 2006–07 GMC Sierra Hybrid 2wd, $250
- 2008 Lexus LS 600h, $450 (purchased on/before 9/31/07) / $0 (purchased on/after 10/1/07)
- 2006–07 Chevrolet Silverado Hybrid 4WD, $650
- 2006–07 GMC Sierra Hybrid 4WD, $650
- 2005 Honda Accord Hybrid, $650 (purchased on/before 12/31/07) / $325 (purchased 1/1/08-6/30/08) / $162.50 (purchased 7/1/08-12/31/08) / $0 (purchased on or after 1/1/09)
- 2006 Honda Accord Hybrid (w/o updated control calibration), $650 (purchased on/before 12/31/07) / $325 (purchased 1/1/08-6/30/08) / $162.50 (purchased 7/1/08-12/31/08) / $0 (purchased on or after 1/1/09)
- 2007 Saturn VUE Green Line, $650
- 2010 Mercedes-Benz S400 Hybrid, $1,150
- 2007–08 Saturn Aura Green Line, $1,300
- 2008 Chevrolet Malibu Hybrid, $1,300
- 2006–07 Honda Accord Hybrid (w/ updated control calibration), $1,300
- 2005–06 Honda Insight CVT, $1,450 (purchased on/before 12/31/07) / $725 (purchased 1/1/08-6/30/08) / $362.50 (purchased 7/1/08-12/31/08) / $0 (purchased on or after 1/1/09)
- 2007 Lexus GS 450h, $1,550 (purchased on/before 30 September 2006) / $775 (purchased 10/01/06-03/31/07) / $387.50 (purchased 04/01/07-09/30/07) / $0 (purchased on or after 10/01/07)
- 2009–10 Chevrolet Malibu Hybrid, $1,550
- 2009 Saturn Aura Hybrid, $1,550
- 2008–09 Saturn Vue Hybrid, $1,550
- 2005 Honda Civic Hybrid (SULEV) MT & CVT, $1,700 (purchased on/before 12/31/07) / $850 (purchased 1/1/08-6/30/08) / $425 (purchased 7/1/08-12/31/08) / $0 (purchased on or after 1/1/09)
- 2009 Cadillac Escalade Hybrid 4WD, $1,800
- 2005–07, 09 Ford Escape Hybrid 4WD, $1,950 (purchased on/before 31 March 2009) / $975 (purchased 04/01/09-09/30/09) / $487.50 (purchased 10/01/09-03/31/10) / $0 (purchased on/after 04/01/10)
- 2006–07, 09 Mercury Mariner Hybrid 4WD, $1,950 (purchased on/before 31 March 2009) / $975 (purchased 04/01/09-09/30/09) / $487.50 (purchased 10/01/09-03/31/10) / $0 (purchased on/after 04/01/10)
- 2009 Mazda Tribute Hybrid 4WD, $1,950
- 2006–08 Honda Civic Hybrid CVT, $2,100 (purchased on/before 12/31/07) / $1,050 (purchased 1/1/08-6/30/08) / $525 (purchased 7/1/08-12/31/08) / $0 (purchased on or after 1/1/09)
- 2006–08 Lexus RX 400h 2WD or 4WD, $2,200 (purchased on/before 30 September 2006) / $1100 (purchased 10/01/06-03/31/07) / $550(purchased 04/01/07-09/30/07) / $0 (purchased on or after 10/01/07)
- 2008 Ford Escape Hybrid 4WD, $2,200 (purchased on/before 31 March 2009) / $1,100 (purchased 04/01/09-09/30/09) / $550 (purchased 10/01/09-03/31/10) / $0 (purchased on/after 04/01/10)
- 2008 Mercury Mariner Hybrid 4WD, $2,200 (purchased on/before 31 March 2009) / $1,100 (purchased 04/01/09-09/30/09) / $550 (purchased 10/01/09-03/31/10) / $0 (purchased on/after 04/01/10)
- 2009–10 Cadillac Escalade Hybrid 2WD, $2,200
- 2010 Cadillac Escalade Hybrid 4WD, $2,200
- 2009–10 Chevrolet Silverado Hybrid, $2,200
- 2008–10 Chevrolet Tahoe Hybrid, $2,200
- 2009 Chrysler Aspen Hybrid, $2,200
- 2009 Dodge Durango Hybrid, $2,200
- 2009–10GMC Sierra Hybrid, $2,200
- 2008–10 GMC Yukon Hybrid, $2,200
- 2007–10 Nissan Altima Hybrid, $2,350
- 2007 Toyota Camry Hybrid, $2,600 (purchased on/before 30 September 2006) / $1300 (purchased 10/01/06-03/31/07) / $650(purchased 04/01/07-09/30/07) / $0 (purchased on or after 10/01/07)
- 2006–08 Toyota Highlander Hybrid 2WD or 4WD, $2,600 (purchased on/before 30 September 2006) / $1300 (purchased 10/01/06-03/31/07) / $650(purchased 04/01/07-09/30/07) / $0 (purchased on or after 10/01/07)
- 2005–07 Ford Escape Hybrid 2WD, $2,600 (purchased on/before 31 March 2009) / $1,300 (purchased 04/01/09-09/30/09) / $650 (purchased 10/01/09-03/31/10) / $0 (purchased on/after 04/01/10)
- 2008–09 Ford Escape Hybrid 2WD, $3,000 (purchased on/before 31 March 2009) / $1,500 (purchased 04/01/09-09/30/09) / $750 (purchased 10/01/09-03/31/10) / $0 (purchased on/after 04/01/10)
- 2008–09 Mercury Mariner Hybrid 2WD, $3,000 (purchased on/before 31 March 2009) / $1,500 (purchased 04/01/09-09/30/09) / $750 (purchased 10/01/09-03/31/10) / $0 (purchased on/after 04/01/10)
- 2008–09 Mazda Tribute Hybrid 2WD, $3,000
- 2005–08 Toyota Prius $3,150 (purchased on/before 30 September 2006) / $1575 (purchased 10/01/06-03/31/07) / $787.50 (purchased 04/01/07-09/30/07) / $0 (purchased on or after 10/01/07)
- 2010 Ford Fusion Hybrid, $3,400 (purchased on/before 31 March 2009) / $1,700 (purchased 04/01/09-09/30/09) / $850 (purchased 10/01/09-03/31/10) / $0 (purchased on/after 04/01/10)
- 2010 Mercury Milan Hybrid, $3,400 (purchased on/before 31 March 2009) / $1,700 (purchased 04/01/09-09/30/09) / $850 (purchased 10/01/09-03/31/10) / $0 (purchased on/after 04/01/10)

== State Incentives ==
The main federal incentive for consumers to purchase fuel efficient vehicles is to give tax credits. States also have their own incentive programs to further incentivize fuel efficient vehicles in their own states. These incentives range from more tax credits, to discounts on insurance, to price reductions on car registration fee's. Some states offer free parking for electric vehicles, or rebates to people who install charging stations at their home or business. Almost every state has a different approach to get more people to reduce their cars carbon footprint. The states incentivize programs to get people to purchase efficient vehicles, because it reduces negative externalities such as air pollution, and increases the likelihood of lower income families to have the opportunity to purchase clean air vehicles.

- Arizona- taxpayers can receive a $75 tax credit to install an EV charging outlet at their own home. Some hybrids may qualify for reduced license fees. Arizona has allowed 10,000 EV and plug in hybrids to gain access to the HOV lanes, but this incentive has reached its capacity.
- California- The state government offers rebates through the Clean Vehicle Rebate Project (CVRP) where taxpayers who purchase an EV or plug in hybrid can receive $2,500. Restrictions on eligibility have been placed due to limited funding and high demand. California allows for an unlimited amount of EV's and Plug in Hybrids to access the states HOV lanes. A majority of Californias utility plants offer discounted rates for charging the cars on off peak hours.
- Colorado- The state government has incentivized consumers on purchasing EV's giving out $5,000 grants that are available instantaneously after the purchase.
- Connecticut- up to $3,000 can be regained via rebate with Connecticut Hydrogen and Electric Automobile Purchase Rebate (CHEAPR) program.
- Delaware- The state government offers a $2,200 rebate to lease or buy an EV. They also have a $1,100 rebate to convert a combustion engine into a pure electric vehicle.

== Carpool lane incentives ==
As of July 29, 2005 Arizona Revised Statutes from the 47th session Chapters 28-2416 and 28-737 allow hybrid vehicles that have been approved by the EPA as meeting, at a minimum, the United States Environmental Protection Agency Ultralow Emission Vehicle Standard with a US$8 special plates/hybrid sticker displayed on said vehicle to use the High Occupancy Vehicle (HOV) lanes regardless of the number of passengers. Arizona has not instituted this policy, as it is awaiting clarification of the federal Hybrid HOV waiver from the EPA. On January 16, 2006, SB 1179 was introduced that would reaffirm the HOV benefit, pending federal clearance.

In California, hybrids with an EPA estimate of 45 mpg_{‑US} (5.2 L/100 km; 54 mpg_{‑imp}) or higher meet the requirements to drive in California's carpool lanes with only one passenger.

Virginia has also provisions for hybrid vehicles. For example, the Toyota Camry Hybrid was eligible, but must have been specially tagged by June 30, 2006 to be eligible for I-95 and I-395 exemption. Exemption for I-66 and Dulles Toll Road HOV usage continues even for registrations beyond June 30.

== See also ==
- Energy Improvement and Extension Act of 2008
- Government incentives for plug-in electric vehicles
