= Ford Fusion Hybrid =

Mid-sized hybrid car by Ford (2010–2020)

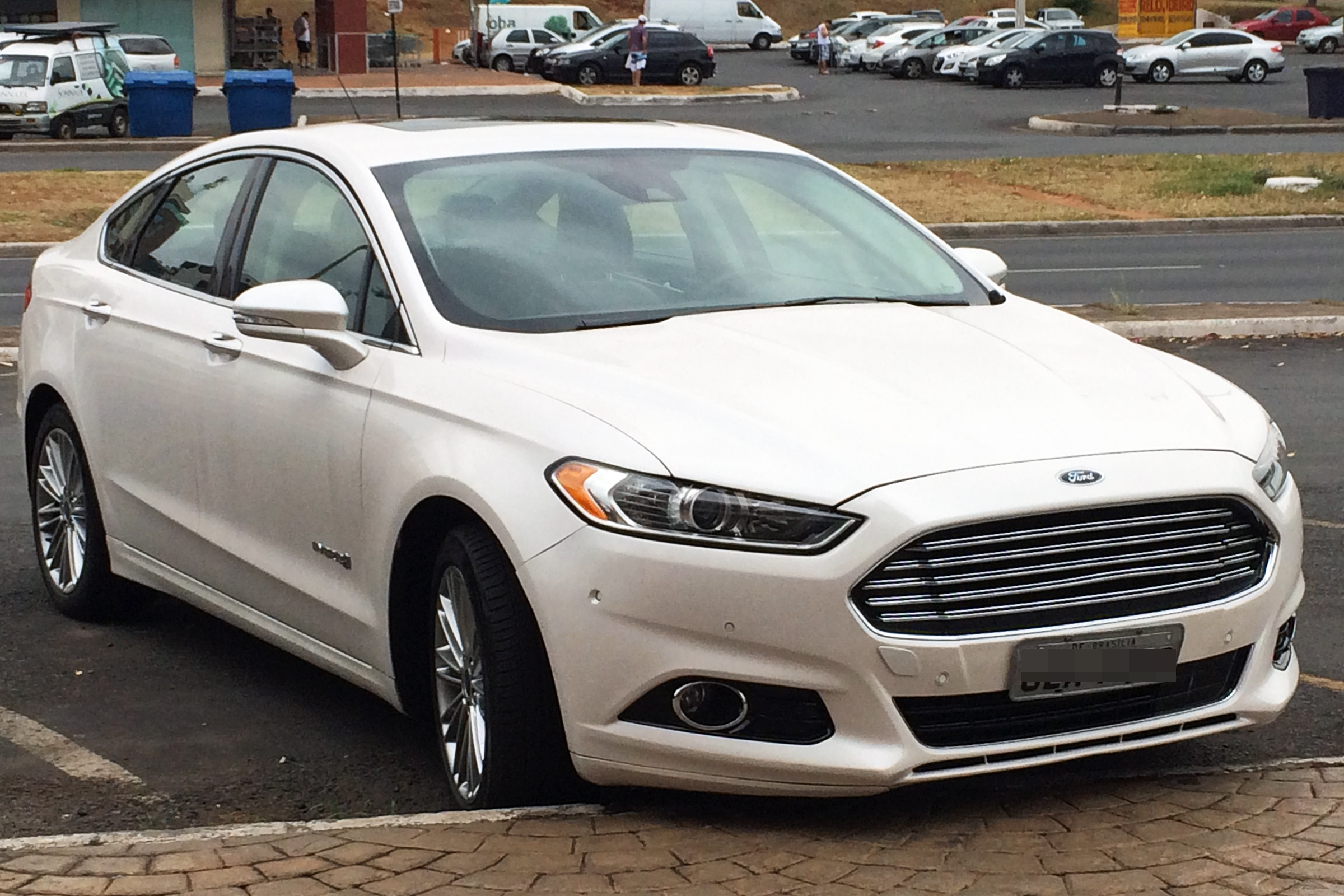

Overview
- Manufacturer: Ford
- Production: 2008–2020
- Model years: 2010–2020
- Assembly: Hermosillo, Sonora, Mexico

Body and chassis
- Class: Mid-size
- Body style: 4-door sedan
- Layout: FF layout

The Ford Fusion Hybrid is a gasoline-electric hybrid powered version of the mid-sized Ford Fusion sedan manufactured and marketed by Ford across two generations. A plug-in hybrid version, the Ford Fusion Energi, was released in the U.S. in February 2013.

The first generation was launched to the U.S. market in March 2009 for model year 2010, together with two badge-engineered variants, the Mercury Milan Hybrid (2010–2011) and the Lincoln MKZ Hybrid (2011–2012), marketed by Ford's respective brands. The second generation hybrid models (2013–2020) were launched under both Ford and Lincoln brands; went on sale in the U.S. in October 2012 and ended production with model year 2020.

The U.S. Environmental Protection Agency (EPA) rated the 2010 Ford Fusion Hybrid at 39 mpg_{‑US} (6.0 L/100 km; 47 mpg_{‑imp}) combined city/highway. The second generation hybrid improved the fuel economy rating to 42 mpg_{‑US} (5.6 L/100 km; 50 mpg_{‑imp}) for combined city/highway driving. The EPA rated the Energi's combined city/highway fuel economy in all-electric mode at 88 miles per gallon gasoline equivalent (MPG-e) (2.7 L gasoline equivalent/100 km; 106 mpg_{-imp}). In hybrid operation (charge-sustaining mode), the Energi has a combined fuel economy of 38 mpg_{‑US} (6.2 L/100 km; 46 mpg_{‑imp}).

The Fusion Hybrid won the 2010 North American Car of the Year Award, and the entire 2013 Ford Fusion line-up, including the Fusion hybrid and plug-in variants, won the 2013 Green Car of the Year. As of December 2016, over 285,000 units of the Fusion hybrid family were sold in the United States since 2009, including the plug-in hybrid variant. As of December 2016, sales of the Fusion Energi totaled 43,327 units delivered in its main market, the U.S.

== First generation (2010) ==
First generation
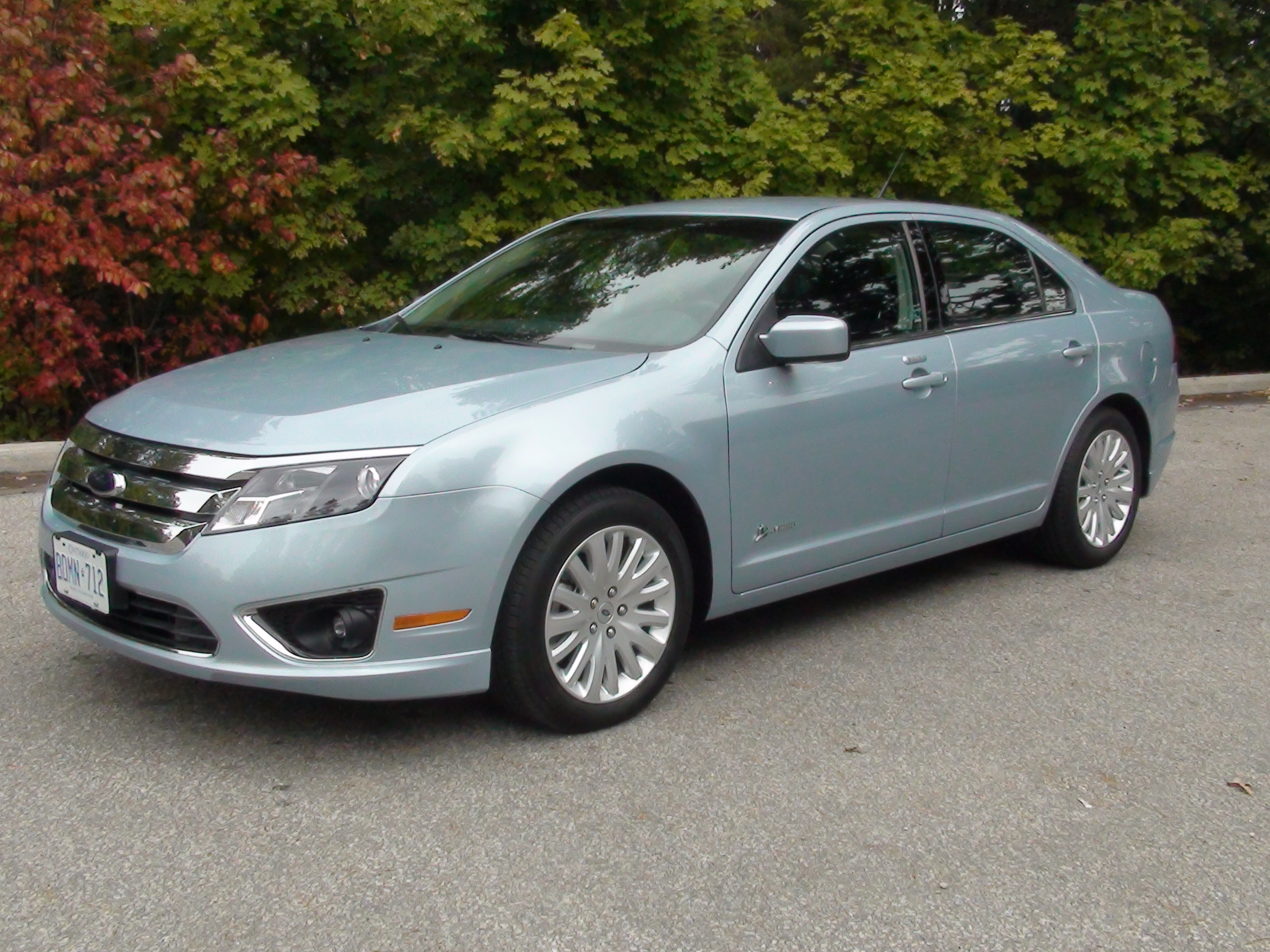

Overview
- Production: December 2008–2012
- Model years: 2010–2012

Body and chassis
- Platform: Ford CD3 platform
- Related: Mercury Milan Hybrid; Lincoln MKZ Hybrid; Ford Fusion

Powertrain
- Engine: Gasoline: I4 2.5 L /156 hp (116 kW) Atkinson cycle Electric: Permanent Magnet AC Synchronous Motor; 106 hp (79 kW) @ 6,500 rpm, 275 volts
- Transmission: Aisin power split device

Dimensions
- Wheelbase: 107.4 in (2,728 mm)
- Length: 190.6 in (4,841 mm)
- Width: 72.2 in (1,834 mm)
- Height: 56.9 in (1,445 mm)
- Curb weight: 3,720 lb (1,690 kg)

=== History and development ===
The hybrid electric version of the Fusion was announced at the 2005 North American International Auto Show, along with the public introduction of the original 2006 Fusion. At that time Ford announced that the hybrid version was scheduled to be introduced in early 2009 for the 2010 model year. Ford formally presented the Fusion at the Greater Los Angeles Auto Show in November 2008.

Along with all other Fusion variants, including two rebadged variants marketed by Mercury and Lincoln, the Hybrid was manufactured at Ford's Hermosillo Stamping & Assembly plant in Sonora, Mexico. Ford set a modest sales target of about 25,000 vehicles a year for the Fusion Hybrid and the similar Mercury Milan.

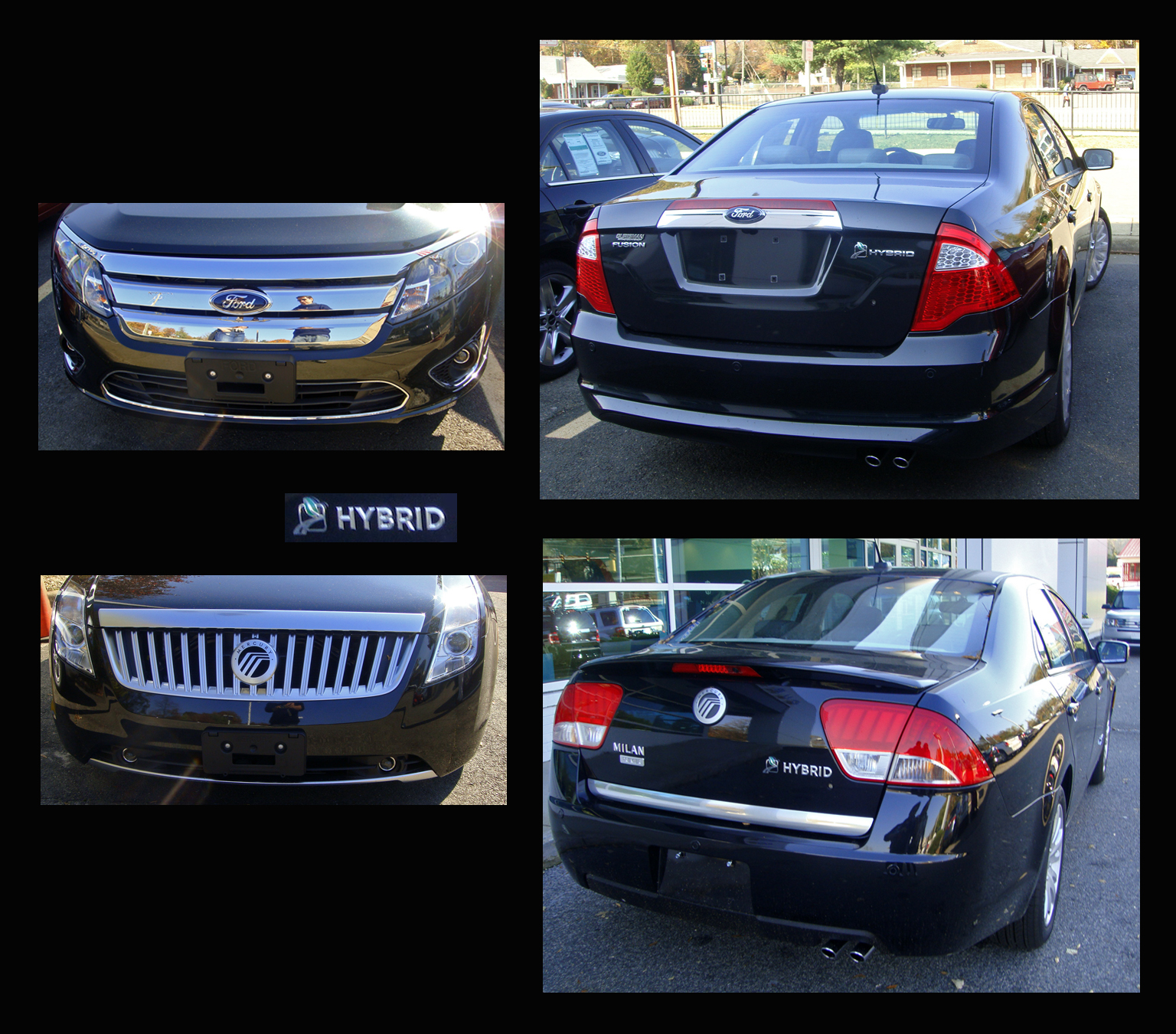
The Milan and Fusion hybrids share the same powertrain but feature different front and rear fascia designs, and distinct headlamps and taillights.

The Fusion Hybrid was made available for press testing in December 2008 and launched to the U.S. market in March 2009, along with the Mercury Milan Hybrid.

Ford had last marketed hybrid vehicles five year prior, with the Ford Escape Hybrid.

The 2011 Lincoln MKZ Hybrid, a rebadged variant of the Fusion, launched in the U.S. market in September 2010, sharing the hybrid powertrain from the Ford Fusion and Mercury Milan hybrids, and delivering an estimated fuel economy of 41 mpg_{‑US} (5.7 L/100 km; 49 mpg_{‑imp}). The MKZ Hybrid offered modest changes to Ford's Smart Gauge with EcoGuide, first introduced in the 2010 Fusion Hybrid.

=== Design and technology ===
The Fusion Hybrid is a "full" hybrid because both propulsion sources, an electric motor powered by a Sanyo supplied 275 V nickel-metal hydride battery, and a 2.5L Atkinson cycle I4 156 hp 136 ft.lb. gasoline engine with intake variable cam timing(iVCT), have substantial power ratings and either can be used alone to propel the vehicle. When braking or decelerating, the Fusion's hybrid system uses regenerative braking, where the electric drive motor becomes a generator, converting the vehicle's momentum back to electricity for storage in the batteries. Ford claims that nearly 94 percent energy recovery is achieved by first delivering full regenerative braking followed by friction brakes during city driving. Under ideal conditions, Ford claims the Fusion Hybrid can cruise 2 miles (3.2 km) at up to 47 miles per hour (76 km/h) on battery power alone.

Between 2000 and 2012, Ford said it had increased its hybrid patents fifty-fold, citing engineer Ming Kuang, technical leader in vehicle controls at Ford Electrification Research and Advanced Engineering, as having expanded Ford's portfoliofrom 10 patents 461. Kuang said "it's about helping make the world my children live in - and the world my children's children will live in - a better place."

=== Safety ===
The Ford Fusion line-up was included in the Insurance Institute for Highway Safety 2010 "Top Safety Pick's" rating for the mid-size category. As of June 2010, Ford Fusion and Mercury Milan hybrids were the only two mid-size hybrid vehicles in the list. Due to the fact that Ford recently modified and strengthened the roof structure of the Flex, Fusion, and MKT vehicles, these 2010 ratings apply only to Lincoln MKZs, Mercury Milan, and Fusions built after April 2010.

=== Fuel economy and environmental performance ===
The U.S. Environmental Protection Agency (EPA) rated the fuel economy for the 2010 Fusion Hybrid at 41 miles per US gallon (5.7 L/100 km; 49 mpg_{‑imp}) city, 36 miles per US gallon (6.5 L/100 km; 43 mpg_{‑imp}) highway. The following table compares fuel economy, carbon footprint, and petroleum consumption between the hybrid version and other drivetrains of the Fusion family as estimated by the EPA and the U.S. Department of Energy:

Economic and environmental performance comparison among the Fusion powertrains available in the U.S. market
Type of Powertrain	Type of fuel	Year model	EPA City mileage (mpg)	EPA Highway mileage (mpg)	Annual fuel cost ^{(1)} ^{(2)} (USD)	Carbon footprint (Ton/yr of CO_{2}) ^{(3)}	Annual Petroleum Use (barrel)
Hybrid electric FWD; Automatic (variable gear ratios), 4 cyl, 2.5L	Gasoline	2011	41	36	$1,083	4.8	8.8
FWD Automatic 6-spd, 4 cyl, 2.5L	Gasoline	2011	23	33	$1,629	7.2	13.2
FWD Automatic (S6), 6 cyl, 3.0L	Gasoline	2011	20	28	$1,840	8.1	14.9
FWD Automatic (S6), 6 cyl, 3.0L	E85 flex-fuel	2011	14	21	$2,269	6.6	5.0
FWD Automatic (S6), 6 cyl, 3.5L	Gasoline	2011	18	27	$2,013	8.9	16.3
AWD Automatic (S6), 6 cyl, 3.0L	Gasoline	2011	18	26	$2,115	9.3	17.1
AWD Automatic (S6), 6 cyl, 3.0L	E85 flex-fuel	2011	13	19	$2,421	7.1	5.3
Notes: (1) Estimates assumes 45% highway driving, 55% city driving, and 15,000 annual miles. (2) Average U.S. prices: $2.82/gallon for gasoline, and $2.42/gallon for E85 fuel. E85 prices vary widely by region. As of early November 2010 the minimum price was $2.02/gallon in Illinois and the maximum price was $2.99/gallon in New York. (3) Direct carbon footprint only and does not account for any potential indirect land use change impacts of biofuels.

Motor Trend found that their Fusion Hybrid delivered only 33.5 mpg_{‑US} (7.0 L/100 km; 40.2 mpg_{‑imp}) in 500 miles (800 km) of mixed driving, 5 mpg off the EPA combined rating. Over another 160 miles (260 km) of testing against a Toyota Camry Hybrid, the same car only achieved 31.8 mpg_{‑US} (7.4 L/100 km; 38.2 mpg_{‑imp}), while the Camry Hybrid delivered 32.7 mpg_{‑US} (7.2 L/100 km; 39.3 mpg_{‑imp}). "If our early numbers hold up, the Fusion Hybrid would be a rare instance of the EPA relapsing into the world of mileage make-believe." However, they noted that when driven very conservatively, the EPA numbers could be achieved. "In typical driving, you might as well throw the Fusion's EPA numbers out the window. But if you decide to really work at it, they're possible." Car and Driver also tested a Fusion Hybrid and achieved no more than 34 mpg_{‑US} (6.9 L/100 km; 41 mpg_{‑imp}) over 300 miles (480 km) of driving, which was greater than the Camry Hybrid (31 miles per US gallon (7.6 L/100 km; 37 mpg_{‑imp})) or Nissan Altima Hybrid (32 miles per US gallon (7.4 L/100 km; 38 mpg_{‑imp})) though not by the margin indicated by the EPA ratings.

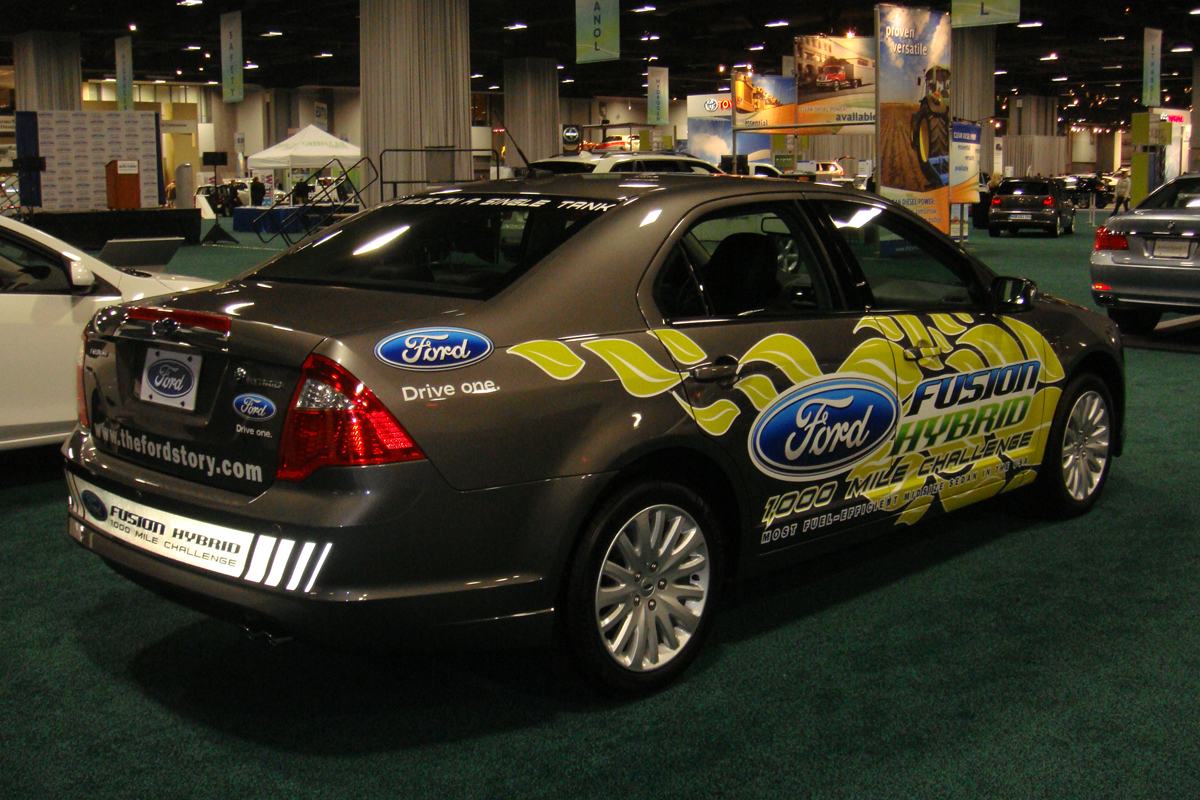
The 2010 Ford Fusion Hybrid promotional vehicle involved in the 1000 Mile Challenge

According to Ford, the vehicle was built to have a fuel efficiency of 41 mpg in the city and 36 mpg on the highway by EPA standards. In December 2008, Autoblog Green staff reported they had obtained in-city mileage of 43.1 mpg on the streets of Los Angeles. In addition, a Los Angeles Times reporter informed in December 2008 that he had obtained 52 mpg in mixed city-highway driving with little difficulty.

On a single-tank publicity stunt conducted in April 2009, a Fusion Hybrid managed 81.5 miles per US gallon (2.89 L/100 km; 97.9 mpg_{‑imp}) on a 1,445.7 mile trip.

Edmunds' InsideLine received a 2010 Fusion Hybrid as a long-term test car. Over 11,000 miles (18,000 km) of driving, their vehicle had only averaged 31.3 mpg_{‑US} (7.5 L/100 km; 37.6 mpg_{‑imp}), with a best tank of 37.7 mpg_{‑US} (6.24 L/100 km; 45.3 mpg_{‑imp}) and a worst tank of 24.4 mpg_{‑US} (9.6 L/100 km; 29.3 mpg_{‑imp}).

Reduced Electric Vehicle Operation of 2010 - 2012 Fusion Hybrid

When owners complained to Ford about greatly reduced gas mileage after nine years of operation because of reduced electric vehicle operation and increased gasoline engine operation, Ford notified their dealers that they were investigating a fix:

TSB #SSM 48238 "Oct 3 2019 8922 - 2010-2012 Fusion HEV, 2010-2011 Milan HEV, 2011-2012 MKZ HEV - Reduced Electric Vehicle Operation
- Some 2010-2012 Fusion hybrid electric vehicle (HEV), 2010-2011 Milan HEV, and 2011-2012 MKZ HEV vehicles may experience reduced electric vehicle operation and increased gasoline engine operation. Do not attempt repairs at this time. Engineering is investigating, monitor OASIS for updates."
- Customer satisfaction program number 22G04 was issued by Ford in September 2022. Ford performed the BECM/PCM update free of charge through Sept 28, 2023. Owners were eligible for a refund if they paid to have this performed at a dealer previously. Title: Application Performance Upgrade 22G04 Certain 2010 – 2012 Model Year Fusion / MKZ / Milan Hybrid Vehicles Hybrid Battery Reduced Electric Vehicle Operation BECM and PCM Software Update

=== Payback time ===
According to Edmunds.com, the price premium paid for the Fusion Hybrid takes five years to recover in fuel savings as compared to its non-hybrid sibling, and is one of the quickest payback periods among top selling hybrids as of February 2012. Edmunds compared the hybrid version priced at US$27,678 with a comparably-equipped gasoline-powered Fusion priced at US$24,493 and found that the payback period is six years for gasoline at US$3 per gallon, for years at US$4 per gallon, and drops to three years with gasoline prices at US$5 per gallon. These estimates assume an average of 15,000 mi (24,000 km) annual driving and vehicle prices correspond to Edmunds.com's true market value estimates. For the same two vehicles, the U.S. EPA estimated the Fusion Hybrid annual fuel cost at US$1,431 while the gasoline-powered Fusion has an annual fuel cost of US$2,320. EPA estimates are based on 45% highway and 55% city driving, over 15,000 annual miles, and gasoline price of US$3.72 per gallon, the national average as of February 2012. The Lincoln MKZ Hybrid has no price premium.

=== SmartGauge for eco driving ===
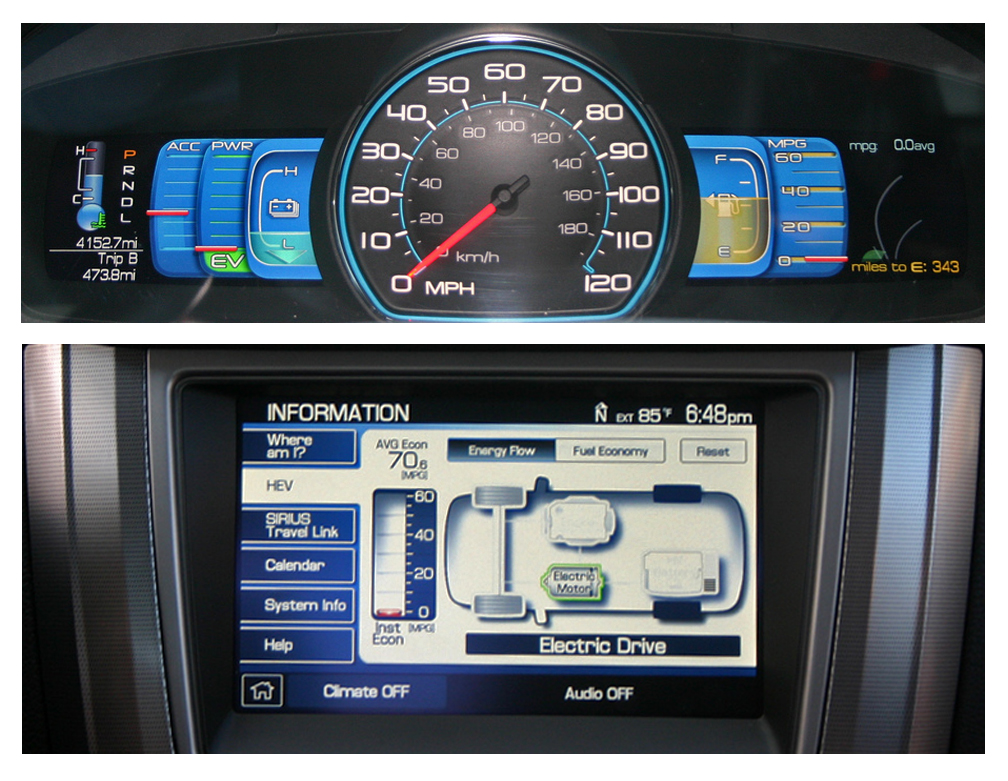
Digital panels to keep track of eco driving style (top) and current drive propulsion (bottom).

The Fusion Hybrid comes with a SmartGauge with the EcoGuide which features two 4.3-inch high-resolution, full-color LCD screens on either side of the vehicle's analog speedometer. The objective of these panel displays is to coach drivers on how to optimize the performance of their hybrid by keeping track of their eco driving improvements.

These screens can be configured to show different levels of driver information, including fuel and battery power levels, and average and instant fuel economy. When set in tutorial mode, the instrument panel in the right side "grows" leaves and vines on-screen to reward fuel-efficient driving. The more leaves and vines that appear, the more efficient the driving behavior is and the more fuel is being saved. Long-term fuel efficiency can also be displayed as a traditional chart. The left side display shows when the car is in pure-electric mode, and shows the state of battery charge.

The 2011 Lincoln MKZ Hybrid, launched in September 2010, offered an improvement of Ford's SmartGauge with EcoGuide introduced with the 2010 Fusion and Milan hybrids.

In 2012, with the introduction of the second generation Fusion, Ford redesigned its SmartGauge with EcoGuide system giving it a newer look and new customizable MyView features. One of the new features, Brake Coach, gives instant feedback on the driver's braking habits and gives advice to maximize the efficiency of the regenerative braking system.

=== Tax credit ===
The Fusion Hybrid qualified for a maximum hybrid tax credit of US$3,400 if purchased by March 31, 2009. The credit dropped to US$1,700 if purchased by September 30, 2009, to US$850 if purchased from October 2009 and March 31, 2010, and phased out on April 1, 2010.

=== Other markets ===
The Brazilian version of the Fusion Hybrid was unveiled at the 2010 São Paulo International Auto Show, with sales began in November 2010. The Fusion Hybrid was the first full hybrid car sold in Brazil. Imported from Mexico, the Fusion Hybrid engine performance and fuel system durability was tested with the Brazilian mandatory E20 to E25 ethanol blends.

== Second generation ==
Second generation
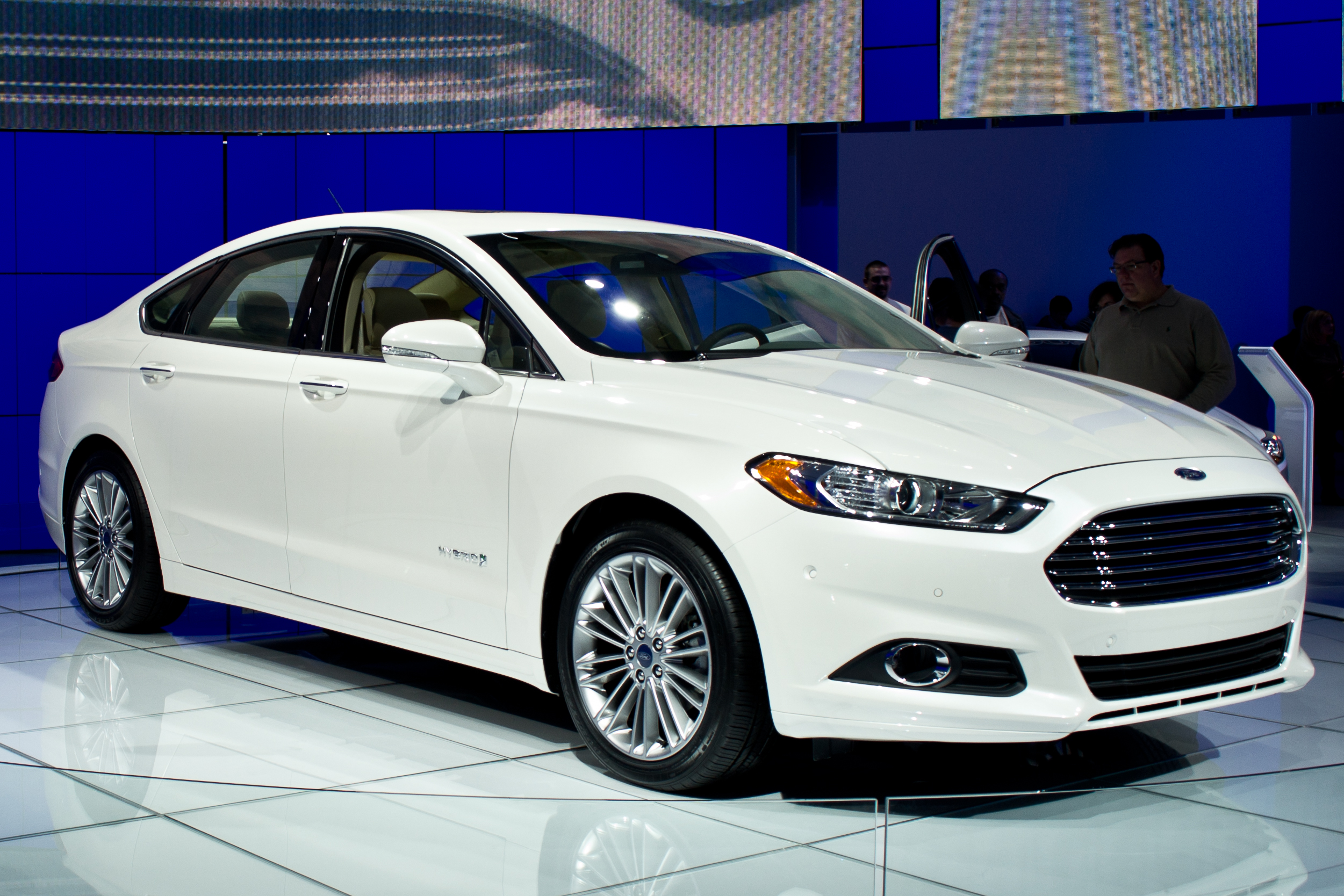

Overview
- Production: 2012–2020
- Model years: 2013–2020

Body and chassis
- Platform: Ford CD4 platform
- Related: Ford Mondeo; Lincoln MKZ

Powertrain
- Engine: 2.0L Duratec 20 Hybrid I4
- Electric motor: Permanent-magnet synchronous AC electric motor
- Transmission: Ford HF35 eCVT
- Battery: 1.4 kWh lithium-ion

Dimensions
- Wheelbase: 112.2 in (2,850 mm)
- Length: 191.7 in (4,869 mm)
- Width: 72.9 in (1,852 mm)
- Height: 58.1 in (1,476 mm)

A complete redesign of the Ford Fusion lineup for the model year 2013 was unveiled at the 2012 North American International Auto Show. The new lineup included three optional engines for the conventional four-cylinder-only gasoline model, a next-generation hybrid version, and a plug-in hybrid version, the Ford Fusion Energi. The Ford Fusion was the first production sedan to offer these three powertrain options. In April 2012 Ford announced that an auto start-stop system would be available for the 1.6-liter EcoBoost engine non-hybrid version. The expected fuel economy was a combined 37 mpg_{‑US} (6.4 L/100 km; 44 mpg_{‑imp}). Sales of the gasoline-powered and hybrid version began in the U.S. in October 2012.

Sales in Europe and Asia, under the Ford Mondeo name, were planned to start in 2013. Ford began taking orders of the Mondeo Hybrid in Germany in August 2014. Production of the Mondeo Hybrid began at Ford's Valencia, Spain, plant in November 2014.

The nickel-metal hydride batteries used in the hybrid first generation were replaced with lithium-ion batteries. The 2013 model year Fusion Hybrid is more fuel efficient than its predecessor, with a US Environmental Protection Agency (EPA) rating of 42 mpg_{‑US} (5.6 L/100 km; 50 mpg_{‑imp}) combined, 44 mpg_{‑US} (5.3 L/100 km; 53 mpg_{‑imp}) in city and 41 mpg_{‑US} (5.7 L/100 km; 49 mpg_{‑imp}) in highway driving.

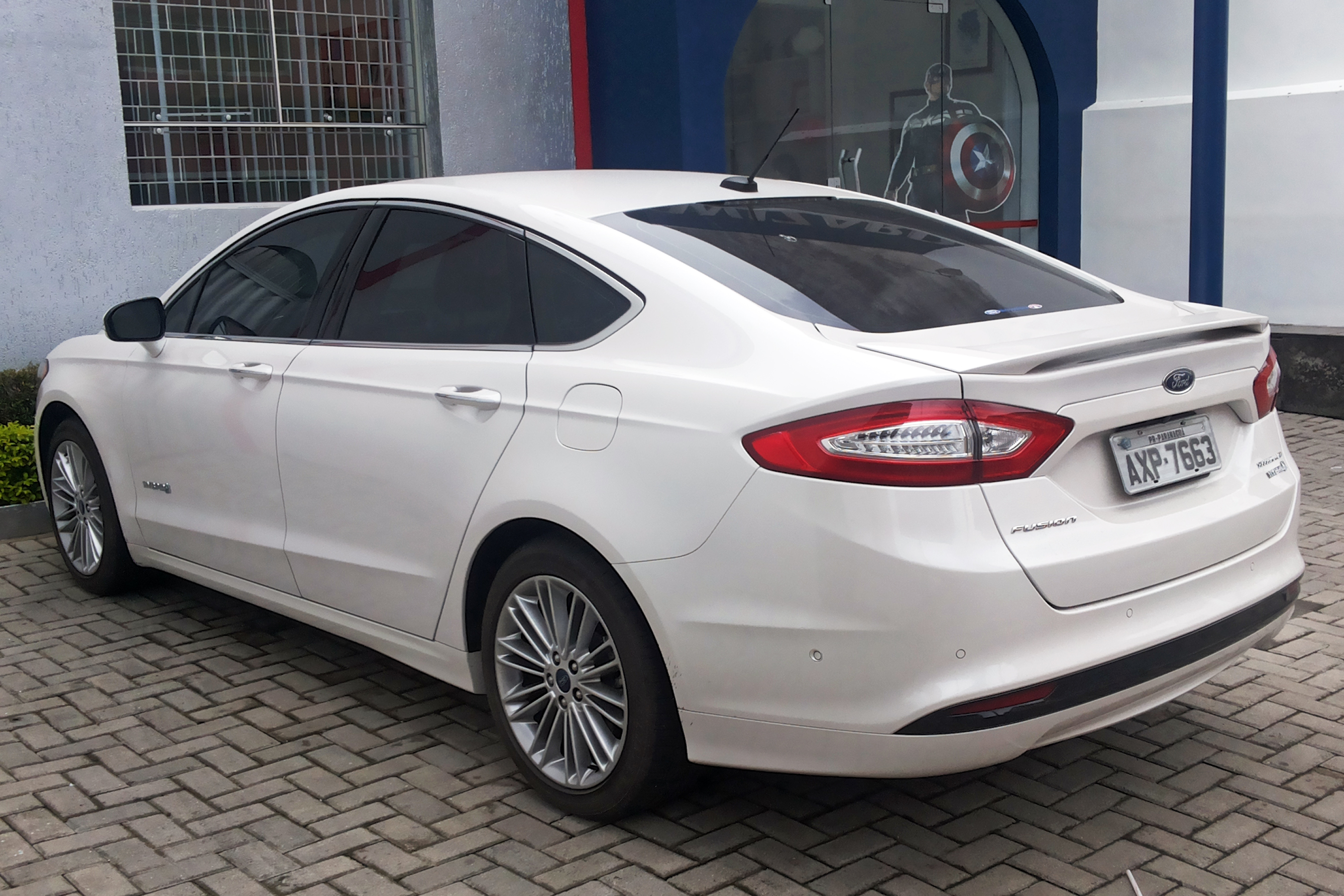
Ford Fusion Hybrid

The second generation hybrid has a powertrain with a 2.0-liter Atkinson-cycle inline-four – downsized from the 2.5-liter unit used in the first generation Fusion Hybrid. Total output is estimated at 185 hp (138 kW) and 130 ft⋅lb (180 N⋅m), running to the front wheels via an electronically controlled continuously variable transmission. The lithium-ion battery pack saves weight and generates more power than the previous NiMH batteries, and raised its maximum speed under electric-only power from 47 to 62 mph (76 to 100 km/h).

The 2013 Fusion Hybrid includes driver assistance and technologies based on sensors, cameras and radar that enable the car to see and respond. Fusion can help drivers maintain proper lane position (Lane Keeping System); adjust vehicle speed to changing traffic conditions through adaptive cruise control; active park assist to help identify suitable parking spaces and help park; and Blind Spot Information System (BLIS) with cross-traffic alert, which consists of sensors in both rear quarter-panels that are able to detect traffic in a driver's blind spot, providing both audible and visual warnings if traffic unseen by the driver is detected. BLIS technology enables cross-traffic alert, even aiding drivers backing out of parking space where visibility is obstructed.

=== Lincoln MKZ Hybrid ===
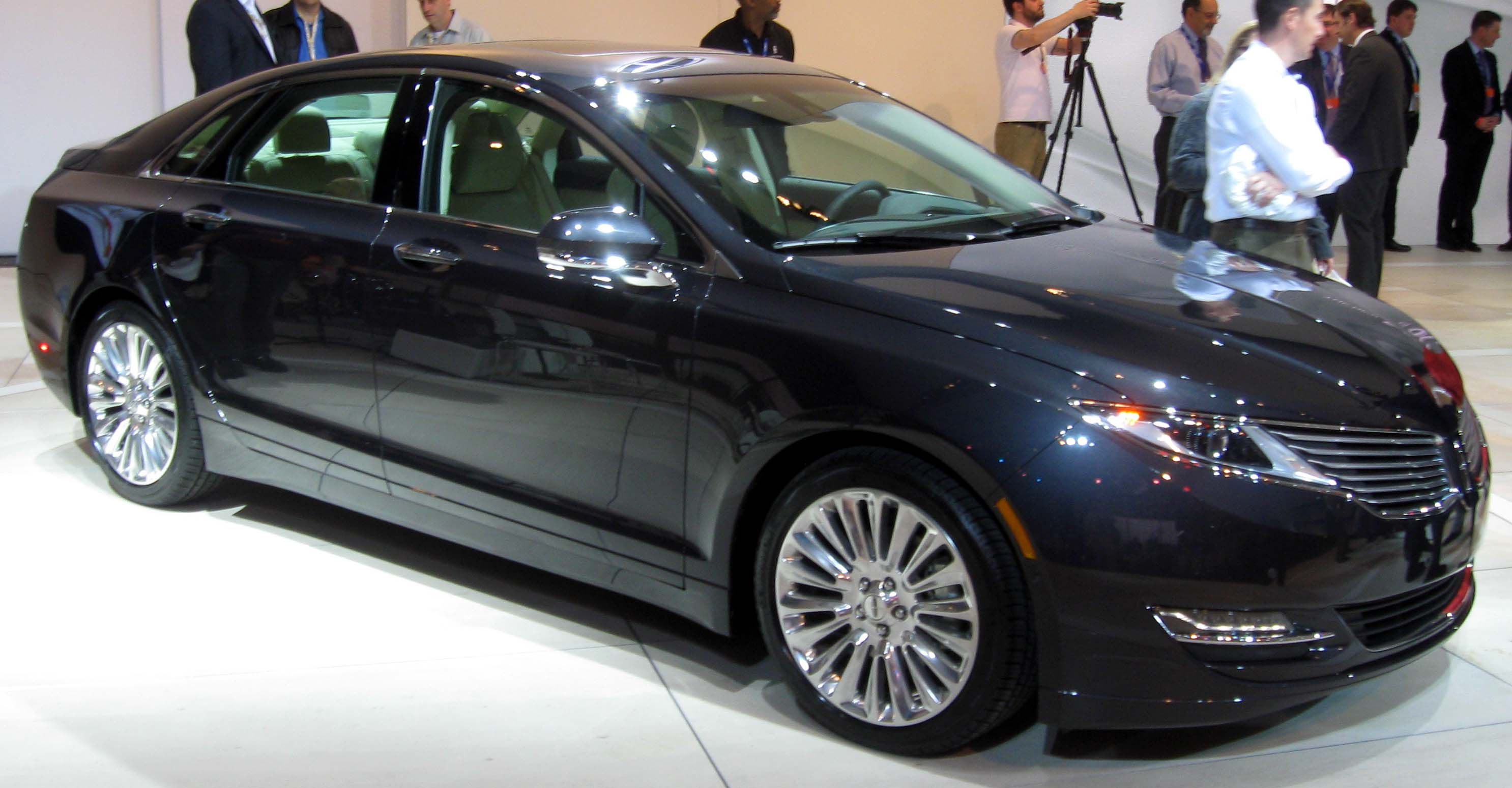
The 2013 Lincoln MKZ Hybrid was unveiled at the 2012 New York International Auto Show

During the 2012 North American International Auto Show, Ford also unveiled the Lincoln MKZ concept model. Ford offered a hybrid option of the redesigned 2013 Lincoln MKZ, and like the previous MKZ generation, the MKZ Hybrid is available for the same price as the non-hybrid model.

The EPA rated initially the 2013 MKZ Hybrid at 45 mpg_{‑US} (5.2 L/100 km; 54 mpg_{‑imp}) with the same rating for combined/city/highway cycles. After the ratings of six Ford models were downgraded in June 2014, the MKZ was the model with the largest fuel economy reduction, 7 mpg_{-US} in city/highway combined. The revised EPA ratings of 2013/14 MKZ Hybrid are 38 mpg_{‑US} (6.2 L/100 km; 46 mpg_{‑imp}) combined, 38 mpg_{‑US} (6.2 L/100 km; 46 mpg_{‑imp}) in city and 37 mpg_{‑US} (6.4 L/100 km; 44 mpg_{‑imp}) in highway driving. Despite sharing the same powertrain, the 2013/14 MKZ Hybrid is rated 4 mpg_{-US} combined less than its sibling the second generation Ford Fusion Hybrid, and 6 mpg_{-US} less in city driving.

=== Ford Mondeo Hybrid ===
The Mondeo Hybrid shares the same powertrain of the Fusion Hybrid combining a 2.0-liter gasoline engine with an electric motor and 1.4 kilowatt-hour lithium-ion battery. Under the New European Driving Cycle the Mondeo is rated at 67.3 mpg_{‑imp} (4.20 L/100 km; 56.0 mpg_{‑US}) in combined driving, and 100.9 mpg_{‑imp} (2.80 L/100 km; 84.0 mpg_{‑US}) for urban driving, with CO_{2} emissions of 99 g/km. Ford set a pricing for the Mondeo Hybrid that is competitive with Mondeo diesel powertrain variants. Retail deliveries are scheduled to begin in the UK in December 2014 at a pricing starting at £24,995.

=== Controversy over fuel economy ratings ===
In December 2012, Motor Trend reported that Consumer Reports and Green Car Reports have found that the 2013 Ford C-Max Hybrid and 2013 Ford Fusion Hybrid, which share the same powertrain, do not deliver their triple 47 mpg_{‑US} (5.0 L/100 km; 56 mpg_{‑imp}) EPA ratings in real-world use. After running both vehicles through Consumer Reports real-world tests, the magazine found that 2013 Fusion hybrid achieved a combined fuel economy average of 39 mpg_{‑US} (6.0 L/100 km; 47 mpg_{‑imp}), with 35 and 41 mpg_{‑US} (6.7 and 5.7 L/100 km; 42 and 49 mpg_{‑imp}) for city and highway. Consumer Reports concluded that the overall fuel economy for the Fusion Hybrid is off by 8 mpg, representing a deviation of about 20%. The consumer magazine said that their overall fuel economy results are usually close to the EPA's combined-mpg estimate, and among current models tested, more than 80% fall within 2 mpg margin. The largest discrepancy the magazine has previously found was 7 and 6 mpg for the Toyota Prius c and the Prius liftback/fastback, respectively.

A few days later the Environmental Protection Agency said it will review claims that two new Ford hybrid vehicles were not delivering the advertised 47 mpg. Linc Wehrly, Director of Light-duty Vehicle Center Compliance Division at EPA's National Vehicle and Fuel Emissions Laboratory in Ann Arbor, Michigan commented that hybrids have far more variability in miles per gallon than a conventional vehicle. Most vehicles' real-world gasoline mileage is less than the EPA sticker number, and can often be 20% less than the sticker number depending on speed, temperature, and other factors. The EPA explained that with hybrids the gap is much wider, as high as a 30% drop. Ford responded in a statement, saying that, "Early C-MAX Hybrid and Fusion Hybrid customers praise the vehicles and report a range of fuel economy figures, including some reports above 47 mpg. This reinforces the fact that driving styles, driving conditions, and other factors can cause mileage to vary." A Ford spokesman also said they followed EPA's test guidelines and the company is standing by the ratings as determined by the current testing protocols.

In July 2013, Ford issued a voluntary software update for the 2013 model year Fusion, C-Max, and MKZ Hybrid to improve on the lower-than-expected MPG claims. Some of the changes included:

- Increasing the maximum pure electric speed from 62 to 85 mph (100 to 137 km/h), allowing increased use of electric-only mode on the highway
- Optimizing the use of Active Grille Shutters to reduce aerodynamic drag under more driving and temperature conditions including cold weather, during air conditioner use, and when the engine coolant temperature is higher
- Reducing the electric fan speed as a function of coolant temperature to minimize the fan's energy consumption
- Shortening engine warm-up time by up to 50 percent to enable electric-only driving and engine shutdown at stops sooner after cold starts
- Optimizing the climate control system to minimize use of the air conditioning compressor and reduce the energy used in cold weather operation.

In August 2013, due to the criticism and after several lawsuits about the worse-than-expected fuel economy, Ford voluntarily lowered all three EPA ratings of the C-Max Hybrid and paid a rebate to 32,000 C-Max owners. The revised fuel economy ratings for combined was lowered from to 47 to 45 mpg_{‑US} (5.0 to 5.2 L/100 km; 56 to 54 mpg_{‑imp}).

In June 2014, Ford announced it had discovered an error in the company's internal testing data, and downgraded the fuel economy ratings on six of its 2013 and 2014 model year vehicles, including all its C-Max, Fusion, and MKZ full hybrids and its two plug-in Energi models. Ford made goodwill payments to around 200,000 customers affected by its mistake. After the ratings were lowered, the 2013/14 Fusion Hybrid still slightly outperformed the 2012/2014 Toyota Camry Hybrid LE by 1 mpg-US city and 2 mpg-US highway, and the Camry XLE by 4 mpg-US city and 3 mpg-US highway.

== Ford Fusion Energi ==
Ford Fusion Energi
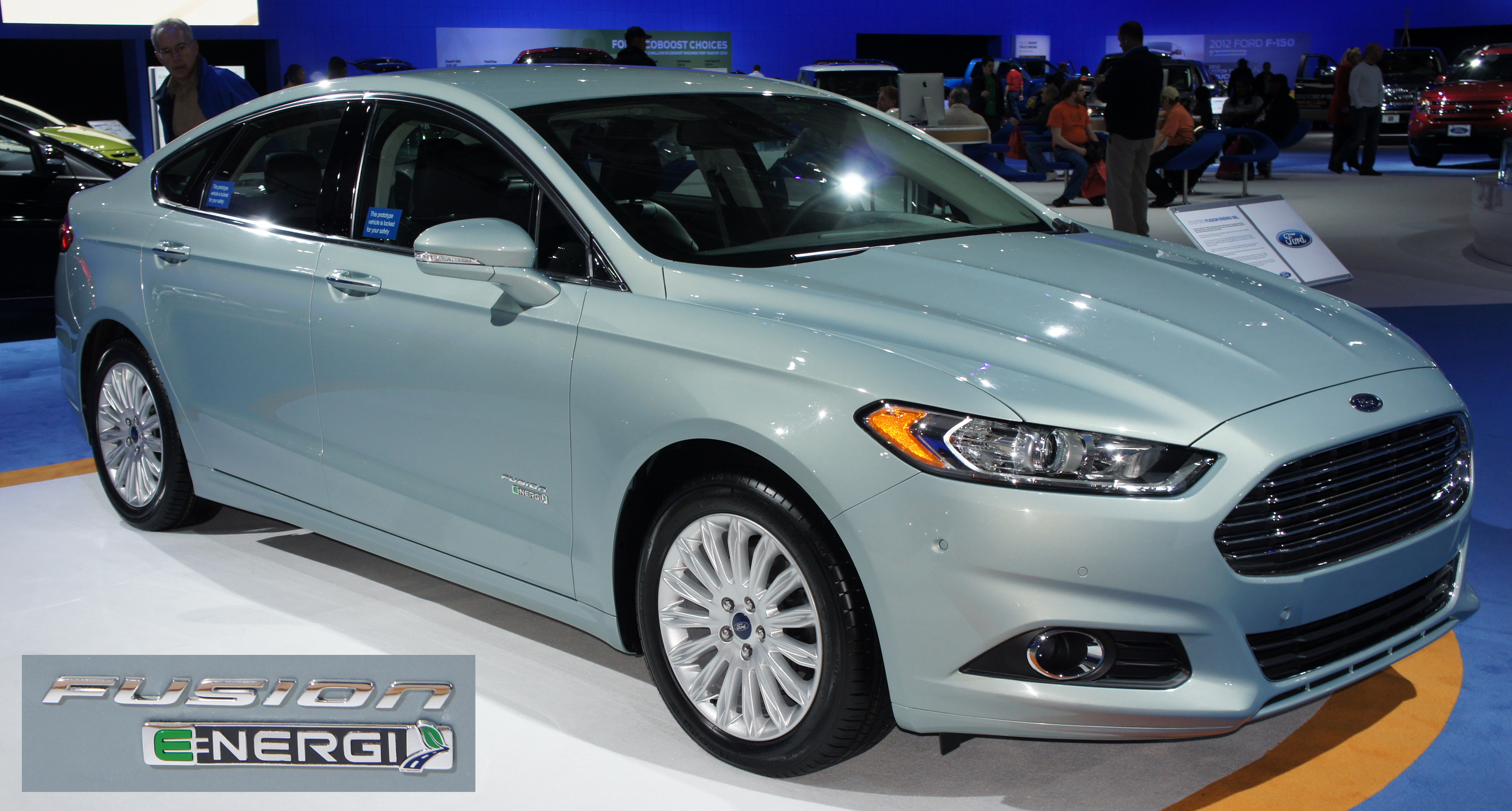

Overview
- Manufacturer: Ford Motor Company
- Production: January 2013–2020
- Model years: 2013–2020

Body and chassis
- Class: Mid-size car
- Body style: 4-door sedan
- Platform: Ford CD4 platform
- Related: Ford C-Max Energi

Powertrain
- Engine: 105 kW (141 hp) 2.0L I4 gasoline
- Electric motor: 88 kW (118 hp)
- Transmission: Ford HF35 eCVT
- Battery: 7.6 kWh lithium-ion
- Electric range: MY 2017; 22 mi (35 km) (EPA); MY 2013/2016; 20 mi (32 km) (EPA)

Ford presented the Fusion Energi plug-in hybrid at the 2012 North American International Auto Show, and U.S. retail sales began in February 2013. Due to its battery pack capacity, the Energi qualified for a federal tax credit up to US$3,750 and any applicable state and local incentives. Energi models purchased in or after 2010 were eligible for a $4,007 tax credit, based on the capacity of the battery. The 2013 Fusion Energi is eligible for access to California's high-occupancy vehicle lanes (HOV) with a solo driver, and had a US$1,500 California state tax rebate.

A refreshed 2017 Fusion Energi was released by mid-2016. In addition to a new fascia and other technological upgrades, the 2017 model year has more efficient electric motors, allowing the refreshed 2017 model year Fusion Energi to increase its all-electric range and to improve its EPA fuel economy ratings. As of December 2016, over 43,700 units had been sold in North America, with 43,327 units delivered in the U.S. and about 386 units in Canada.

Unlike the regular hybrid there is no Lincoln MKZ version of the Energi.

=== Specifications and range ===
The Fusion Energi uses the same non-turbo 2-liter 4-cylinder engine supplements as the 2013 Fusion Hybrid to assist the electric motor. The Energi has a 7.6 kWh lithium-ion battery that powers the 88 kW (118 hp) electric motor. The plug-in hybrid delivers total horsepower of 195 (145 kW) with a fully charged battery and has an electric-only top speed of 85 mph (137 km/h), 23 mph (37 km/h) more than the Toyota Prius Plug-in Hybrid.

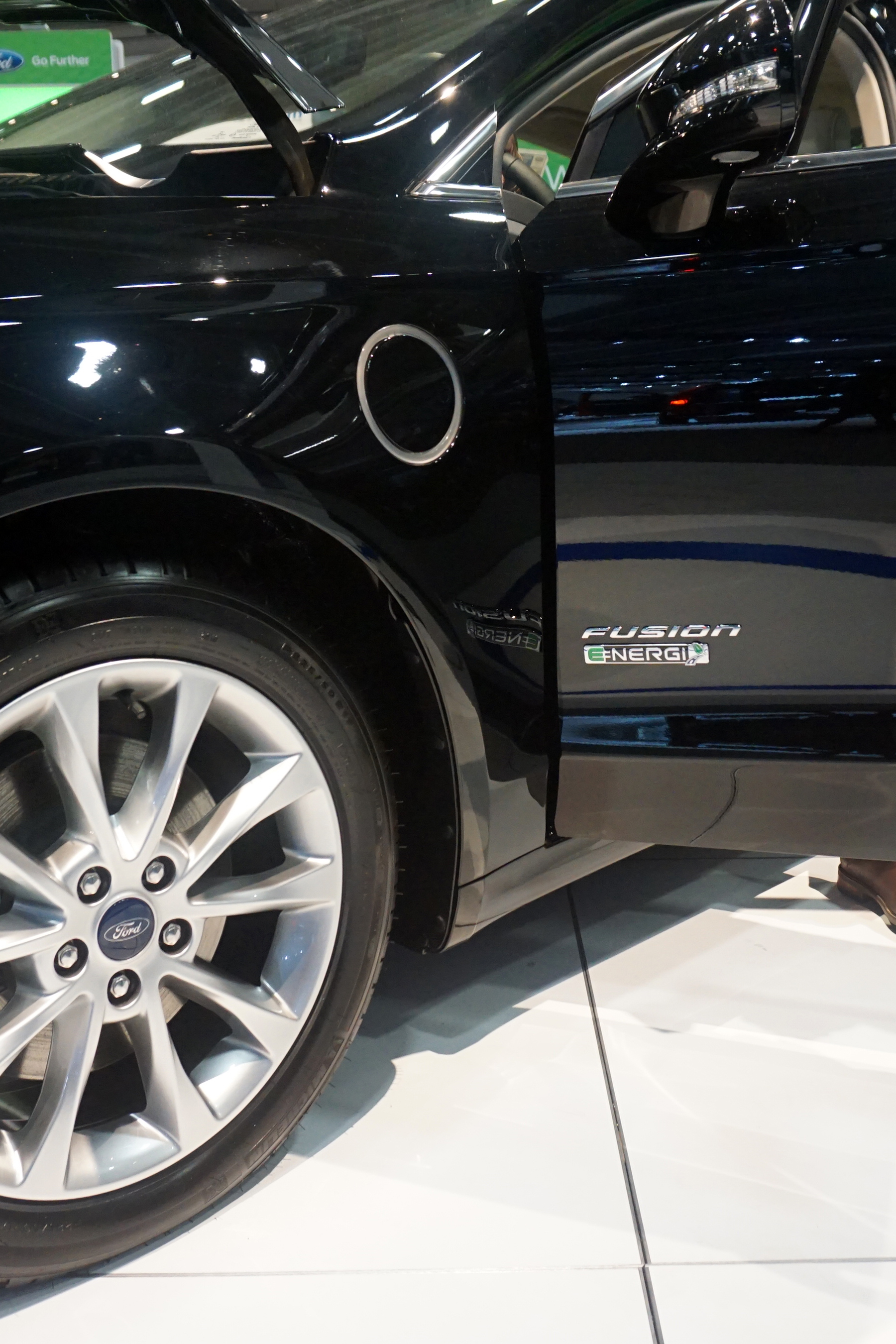
Charging port of the 2017 Ford Fusion Energi

The Fusion Energi, model years 2013 through 2016, has an official EPA all-electric range of 20 mi (32 km) and a total range with a full tank of gasoline and a fully charged battery of 550 mi (890 km). The all-electric range of the 2017 and newer model year Fusion Energi is 22 mi (35 km) with total range of 610 mi (980 km).

The EPA's 2015 edition of the Light-Duty Automotive Technology, Carbon Dioxide Emissions, and Fuel Economy Trends presents utility factors for plug-in hybrids to represent the percentage of miles that will be driven using electricity by an average driver, in electric only or blended modes. Both the Fusion and C-Max Energi models have a utility factor in EV mode of 45%, compared with 83% for the BMW i3 REx, 66/65% for the Chevrolet Volt/Cadillac ELR, 43% for the McLaren P1, 37% for the BMW i8, and 29% for the Toyota Prius PHV.

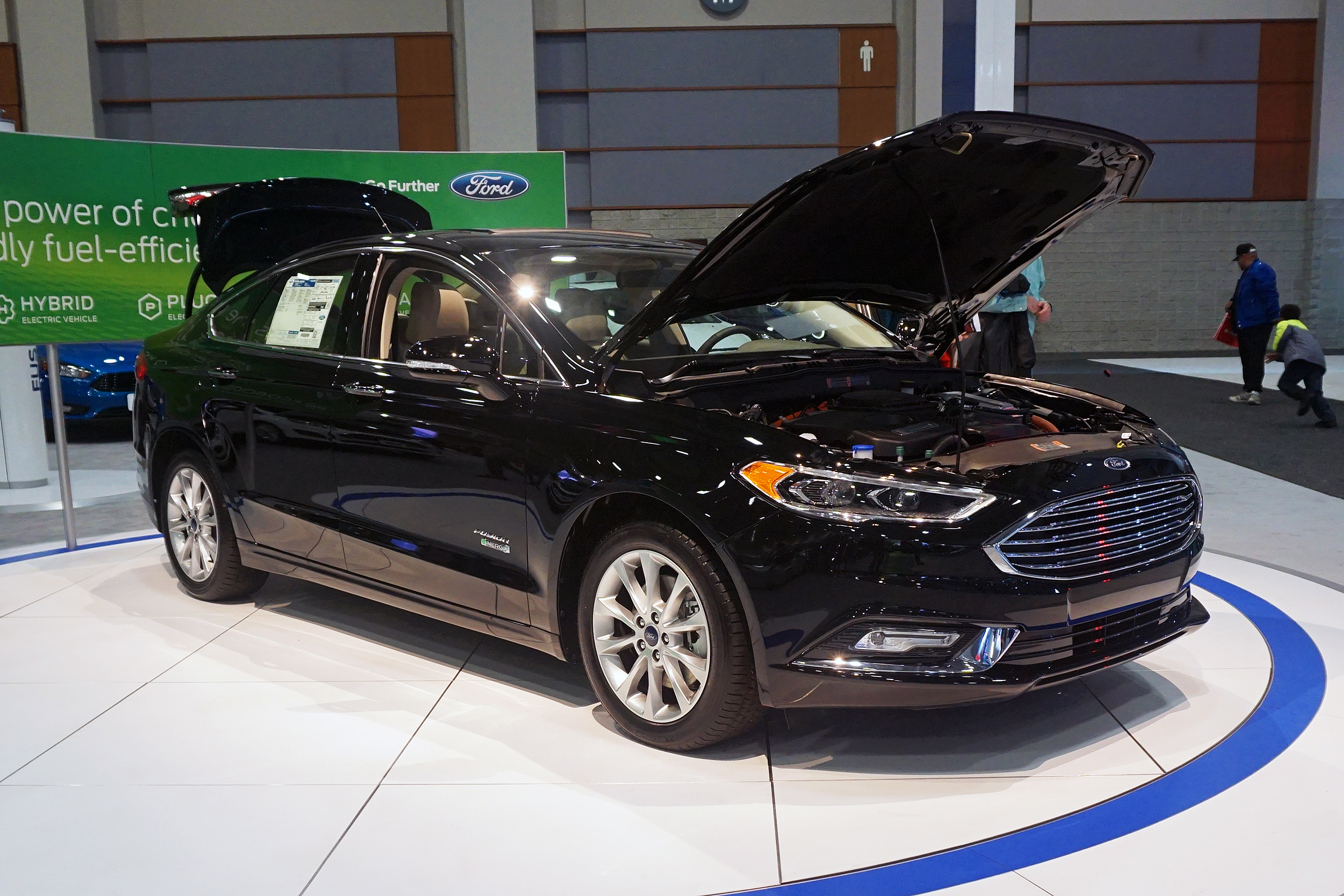
The refreshed 2017 model year Fusion Energi improved its EPA rated fuel economy in all-electric mode to 97 miles per gallon gasoline equivalent (MPG-e).

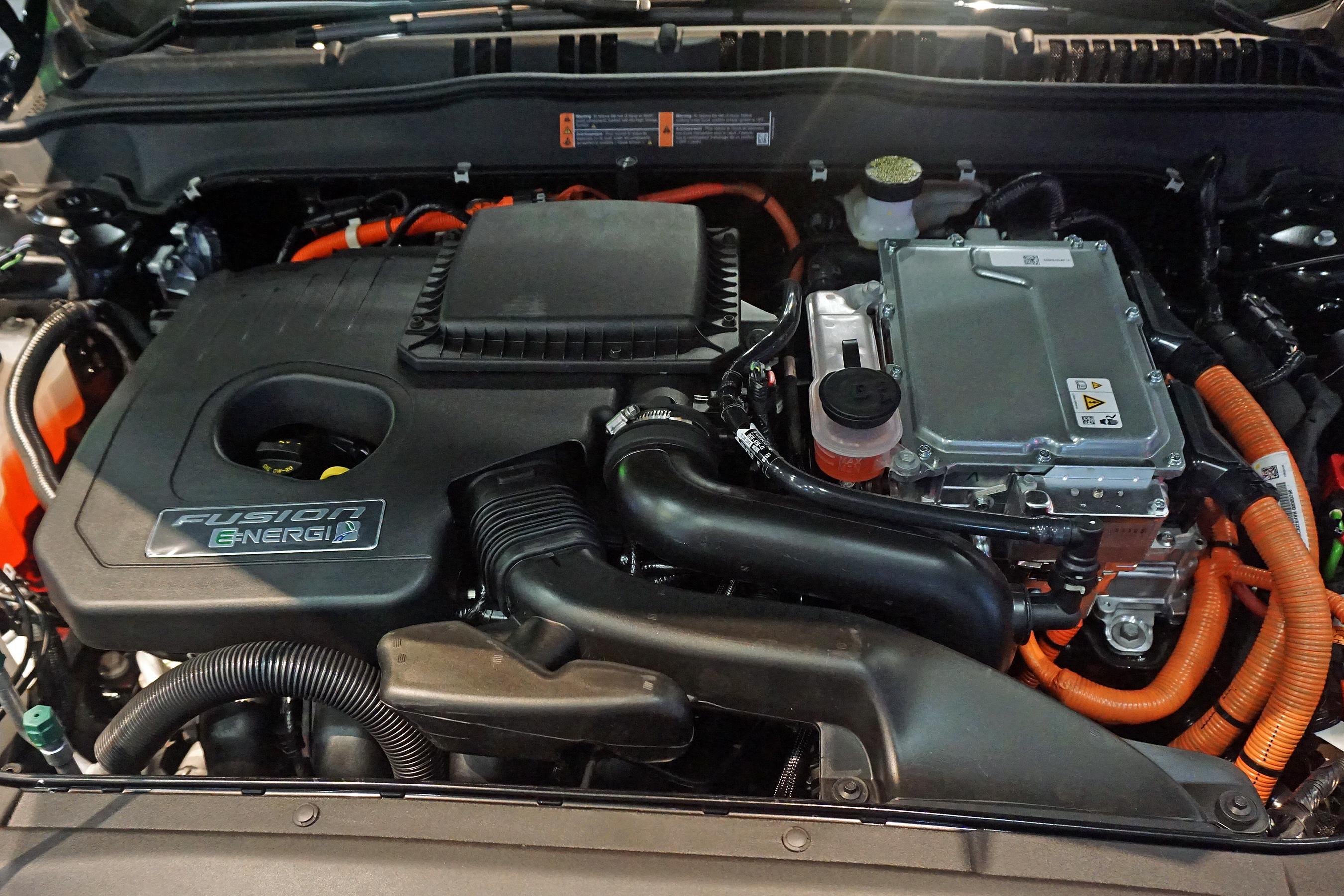
Hybrid 2.0L gasoline powered-engine (left) and inverter system controller on top of the AC electric motor.

In May 2016, Ford reported, based on data collected from more than 610 million miles (976 million km) logged by its electrified vehicles through its telematics system, that drivers of these vehicles run an average of 13,500 mi (21,700 km) annually on their vehicles, with about half of those miles operating in all-electric mode. A breakdown of these figures shows an average daily commute of 42 mi (68 km) for Ford Energi plug-in hybrid drivers. According to Ford data, currently most customers are likely charging their vehicles only at home.

=== Fuel economy ===
Initially, the EPA rated the Energi's combined city/highway fuel economy in all-electric mode at 100 miles per gallon gasoline equivalent (MPG-e) (2.4 L gasoline equivalent/100 km). Later, due to complaints from owners not achieving the sticker fuel economy, and following a technical review, the official EPA rating in EV mode was downgraded to 88 MPG-e (2.7 L/100 km). The Fusion Energi combined fuel economy equivalent is the same as the 2013 Ford C-Max Energi. In a similar way, in hybrid operation, initially the Energi had an EPA combined city/highway fuel economy of 43 mpg_{‑US} (5.5 L/100 km; 52 mpg_{‑imp}). It was later downgraded by the EPA to 38 mpg_{‑US} (6.2 L/100 km; 46 mpg_{‑imp}). EPA's rating for combined EV/hybrid operation is 51 MPG-e (4.6 L gasoline equivalent/100 km), which allowed the Fusion Energi to rank at the time in sixth place, together with the C-Max Energi, among the top ten EPA-Rated Fuel Sippers since 1984.

The refreshed 2017 model year Fusion Energi has an increased EPA rated fuel economy in all-electric mode to 97 miles per gallon gasoline equivalent (MPG-e) (2.4 L/100 km) for combined city/highway driving, with an energy consumption of 35 kWh/100 mi. The EPA rating in hybrid operation rose to 42 mpg_{‑US} (5.6 L/100 km; 50 mpg_{‑imp}).

A police pursuit version achieves 38 mpg_{‑US} (6.2 L/100 km; 46 mpg_{‑imp}), whereas the regular Interceptor gets 18 mpg_{‑US} (13 L/100 km; 22 mpg_{‑imp}).

== Awards and recognitions ==
=== First generation ===
- In April 2009, Kelley Blue Book included the 2010 Ford Fusion Hybrid among its 2009 list of "Top 10 Green Cars".
- The 2009 U.S. News & World Report car ranking for best affordable mid-size cars is led by the 2010 Mercury Milan Hybrid followed by the 2010 Ford Fusion Hybrid. The 2010 Toyota Prius is ranked No. 4 together with the 2010 Toyota Camry Hybrid, and the 2009 Nissan Altima Hybrid ranks No. 12.
- In November 2009, the entire 2010 Ford Fusion line-up, including the Fusion Hybrid, was selected as the 2010 Motor Trend Car of the Year.

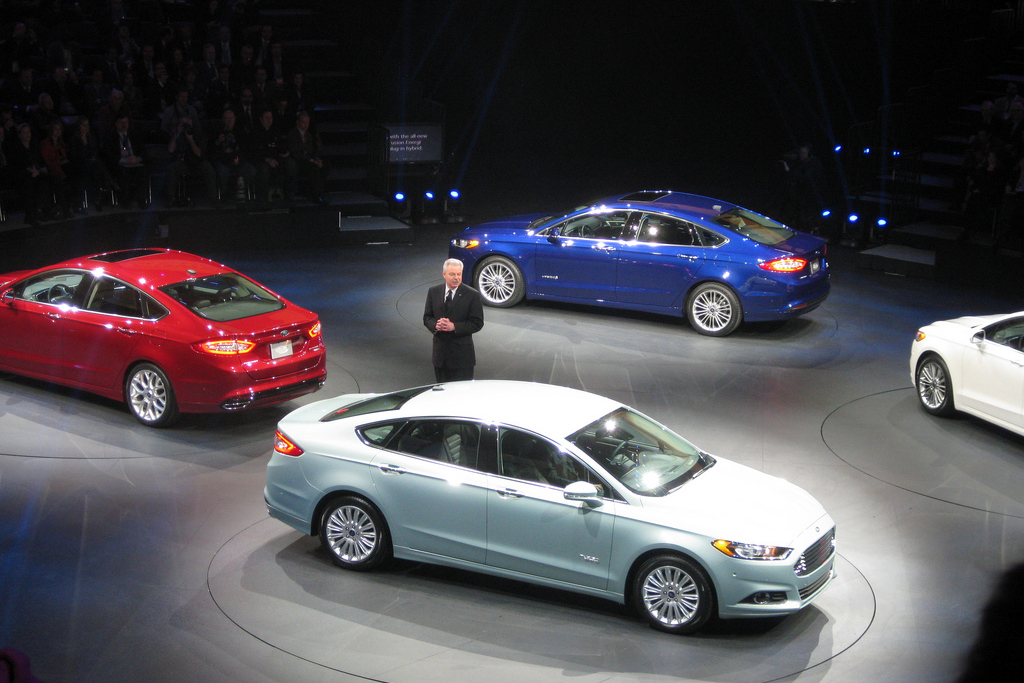
The 2013 Ford Fusion line-up, including the Fusion hybrid and plug-in variants, won the 2013 Green Car of the Year.

- In December 2009, Car and Driver magazine listed the 2010 Fusion Hybrid among the "10 Best Cars". The magazine stated that the Fusion Hybrid was the most advanced of all the cars they tested.
- In December 2009, Automobile Magazine named the Fusion Hybrid one of the 2010 Automobile All-Stars.
- In January 2010, the Fusion Hybrid won the 2010 North American Car of the Year Award at the Detroit Auto Show.
- In February 2010, Consumer Reports included the Fusion Hybrid in the "American Top Picks 2010" leading the Green Car category.
- In April 2010, Kelley Blue Book again included the Ford Fusion Hybrid among its 2010 list of "Top 10 Green Cars".
- In March 2010, Mother Earth News included the 2010 Fusion Hybrid in its list of "Best Green Cars of 2010".
- In February 2011, Consumer Reports included the Fusion Hybrid in the "American Top Picks 2011" leading the Green Car category.

=== Second generation (2013) ===
- In November 2012, the entire 2013 Ford Fusion line-up, including the Fusion hybrid and plug-in variants, and the gasoline and EcoBoost engine options, won the 2013 Green Car of the Year awarded by the Green Car Journal at the Los Angeles Auto Show.

== Sales ==
=== 2009–2012 ===
During 2009, the Fusion Hybrid sold in the U.S. market a total of 15,554 units and the Milan Hybrid 1,486 units, as reported by the manufacturers. Although the Fusion Hybrid helped Ford bypass Honda to become the second biggest seller of hybrids in the US market in the month of December 2009, for the whole year of 2009, Honda sold more hybrid vehicles (35,691 units) than Ford (33,520 units) and the 2010 Honda Insight also outsold the Fusion Hybrid, with 20,572 units.

For 2010, U.S. sales of Ford Fusion Hybrid reached of 20,816 units, helping the model to become the third best selling hybrid in 2010 after the Toyota Prius and Honda Insight. The Milan Hybrid sold 1,416 units in 2010 and its production was discontinued as part of Ford's decision to phase out the entire Mercury brand. Purchases by the US Government at the behest of the Obama administration accounted for almost a third of the Ford Fusion Hybrids produced between 2009 and late 2010.

Ford reported that Fusion sales reached 151,004 units through July 2011, of which, 7,780 were the hybrid version, representing a 5.1% market share of all Fusion sales. During year 2011, the Fusion Hybrid sold 11,286 units and the Lincoln MKZ Hybrid sold 5,739 units, ranking sixth and tenth correspondingly, in hybrid sales for calendar year 2011. Fusion hybrid sales in 2012 increased 24.9% over 2011 sales, and hybrid models represented a 5.8% share of the 241,263 Fusion sold in 2012.

=== 2013 ===
The introduction of the redesigned 2013 model year Fusion, with a more fuel efficient second generation powertrain, resulted in increased sales of the hybrid version, and by August 2013, sales were up 275.2% over the same period in 2012. The Fusion Energi achieved record sales in August 2013. Also during this month, the Fusion Hybrid recorded its best sales month ever in Washington, D.C., San Francisco and Seattle, and its second best-selling month in Los Angeles, another key hybrid market. This rapid increase in sales contributed to Ford achieving its best August electric drive vehicle sales ever. The Fusion Hybrid sales increased 164.3% from 2012 and ended 2013 as the fourth top selling hybrid in the U.S. after the Prius liftback, the Prius c and the Toyota Camry Hybrid.

The redesigned 2013 model year Lincoln MKZ hybrid also experienced somewhat stronger sales during 2013. In July 2013, Ford announced that for the 2014 model year MKZ hybrid it would increase the share of production allocated to the hybrid version, from 20% for the 2013 model year to 40% of the 2014 model year. The Lincoln MKZ Hybrid is popular among consumers in part because it has the same base price as the non-hybrid MKZ.

=== 2014 ===
Sales of hybrid electric cars in the U.S. in 2014 declined 8.8% from 2013. Following the trend of the hybrid market, Fusion Hybrid sales were down 5.0% from 2013, and continued to rank as the fourth top selling hybrid in the U.S. Sales of Lincoln MKZ Hybrid continued its growth trend with sales up 34.3% from a year earlier. The American plug-in hybrid market in 2014 was up 13.1% from 2013, while combined sales of both of Ford's Energi models (Fusion and C-Max) increased by 50.9% despite the reduction of their fuel economy ratings. Sales of the Fusion Energi were up 89.7% from 2013 while C-Mx Energi sales were up only by 17.9%.

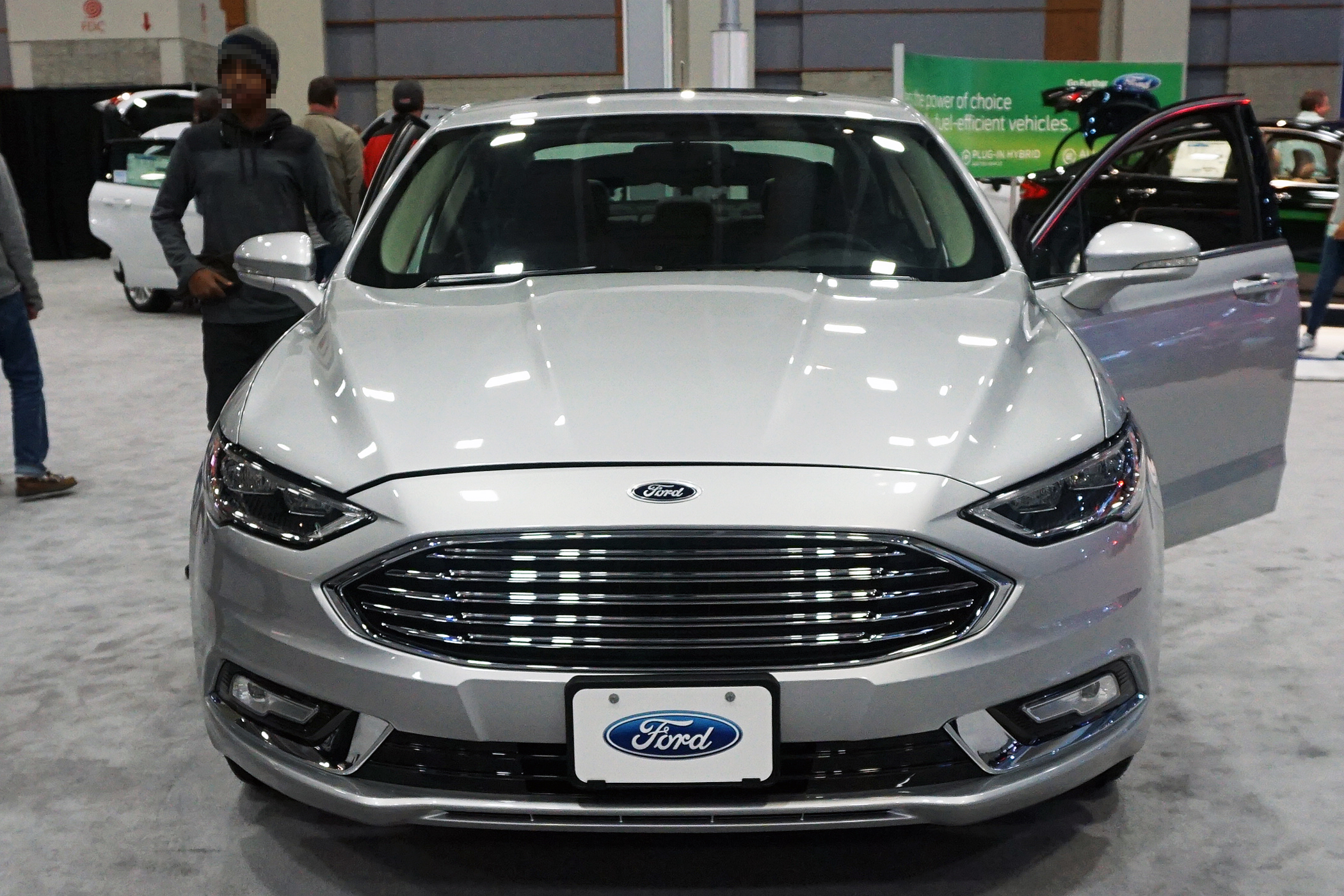
Frontal view of the refreshed 2017 Ford Fusion Hybrid

=== 2015 ===
The American hybrid electric segment continued to decline in 2015, down 15% from 2014. Following the general U.S. trend, Fusion Hybrid sales were down 30.3% from 2014, and the Fusion continued to rank as the fourth top selling hybrid in the U.S. Sales of Lincoln MKZ Hybrid fell 16.2% from a year earlier. The American plug-in hybrid market in 2015 was up 5.8% from 2014, however, sales of the Fusion Energi were down 15.6% from 2014, and C-Max Energi sales were down by 10.0%. The Fusion Energi ranked as the second top selling plug-in hybrid in the country after the Chevrolet Volt, up from third place in 2014, and passing the Toyota Prius Plug-in Hybrid.

=== 2017 ===
In 2017, after a redesign which improved efficiency, Ford Fusion Hybrid sales surged by 70.8%, making it the number two selling hybrid car in America, after the Toyota Prius Liftback, which had 12.5% more sales. In contrast, the newly released Prius Prime surged 745%, consuming all the growth in the PHEV market, and American PHEVs like the Fusion (-39.6%) and Chevy Volt (-17.7%) suffered steep declines as new PHEV models from Volvo, BMW, and Mercedes ate into American car sales.

=== Total US sales ===
Since 2009 a total of 356,534 units of the Fusion hybrid family, including the Energi plug-in hybrid, have been sold in the United States through December 2017. U.S. sales by year for each model and the share of hybrids out of total model sales are shown in the following table:

Ford Fusion hybrid family sales in the U.S. 2009 - 2016
Year	Ford Fusion Hybrid	HEV share	Mercury Milan Hybrid	HEV share	Lincoln MKZ Hybrid	HEV share	Ford Fusion Energi	PHEV share
2009	15,554	8.6%	1,468	5.4%				
2010	20,816	9.5%	1,416	4.9%	1,192	5.3%		
2011	11,286	4.5%			5,739	20.8%		
2012	14,100	5.8%			6,067	21.6%		
2013	37,270	12.6%			7,469	23.1%	6,089	2.1%
2014	35,405	11.5%			10,033	29.5%	11,550	3.8%
2015	24,681	8.2%			8,403	27.2%	9,750	3.2%
2016	33,648	12.7%			7,219	23.6%	15,938	6.0%
2017	57,474	27.4%			5,931	21.7%	9,632	4.5%
Total sales	250,234	-	2,884	5.1%	53,341	-	52,959	-

== See also ==
- Ford CD2 platform
- Ford CD4 platform
- Ford Fusion (regular non-hybrid version)
- Ford Motor Company
- Hybrid electric vehicles in the United States
- List of hybrid vehicles
- List of modern production plug-in electric vehicles
- Plug-in electric vehicles in the United States
