= Honda Stepwgn =

Minivan produced by Honda

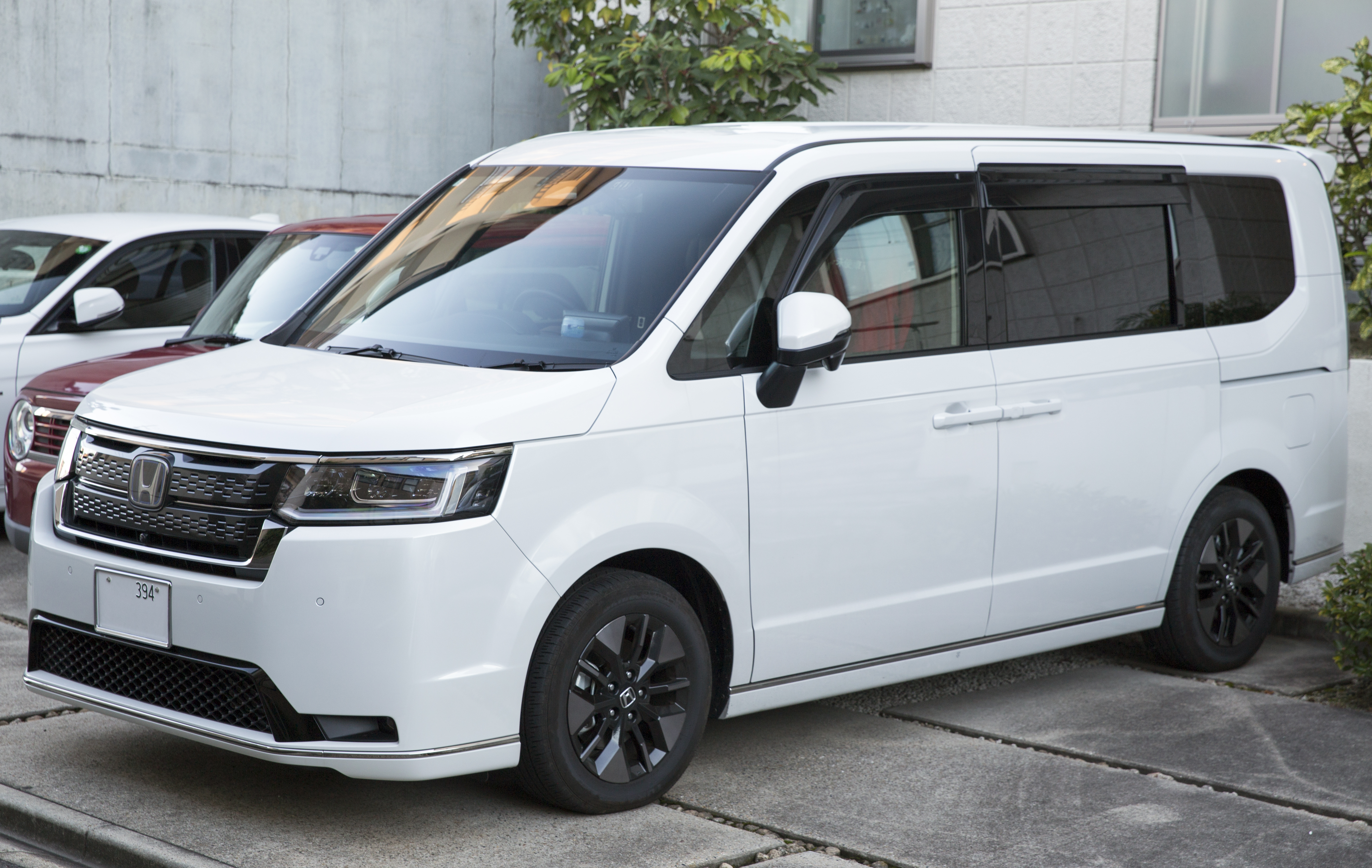
- Sixth generation Honda Stepwgn Spada (RP8)

Overview
- Manufacturer: Honda
- Production: 1996–present
- Assembly: Japan: Sayama, Saitama (Sayama Plant, 1996–2021); Yorii, Saitama (Yorii Plant, 2022–present)

Body and chassis
- Class: Minivan
- Layout: Front-engine, front-wheel-drive Front-engine, four-wheel-drive

The Honda Stepwgn (Japanese: ホンダ・ステップワゴン, Hepburn: Honda Suteppuwagon; pronounced "step wagon") is a minivan produced by Honda since 1996. In contrast to the Odyssey and also the Stream, it sports a taller, more upright greenhouse and can accommodate eight people instead of seven. For its first two generations, the car had one door on the driver's side and two doors on the passenger's side.

== First generation (RF1/2; 1996) ==
First generation
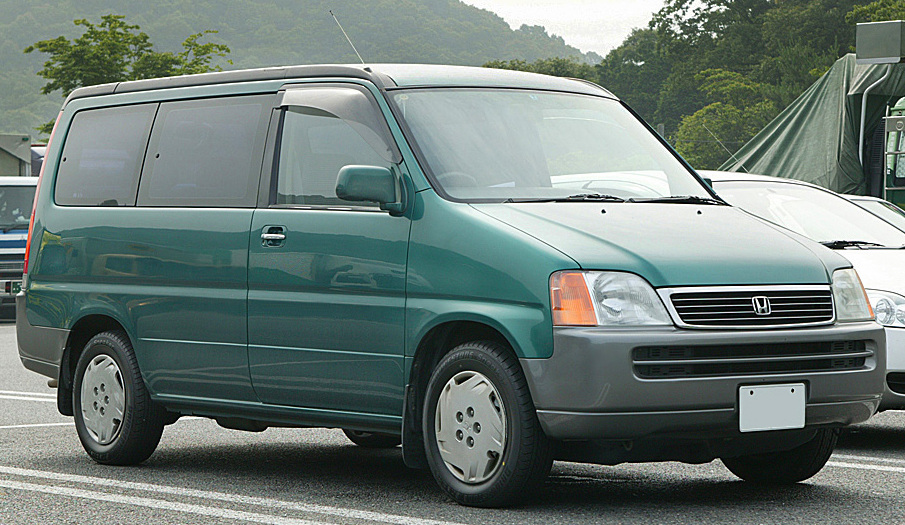
- Honda Stepwgn (pre-facelift)

Overview
- Model code: RF1/2
- Production: 1996–2001

Body and chassis
- Body style: 4-door minivan
- Related: Honda S-MX

Powertrain
- Engine: 2.0 L (122.0 cu in) B20B 125 PS (91.9 kW) I4
- Transmission: 4-speed automatic

Dimensions
- Wheelbase: 2,855 mm (112 in)
- Length: 4,705 mm (185 in)
- Width: 1,695 mm (67 in)
- Height: 1,815 mm (71 in)
- Curb weight: 1,410–1,645 kg (3,109–3,627 lb)

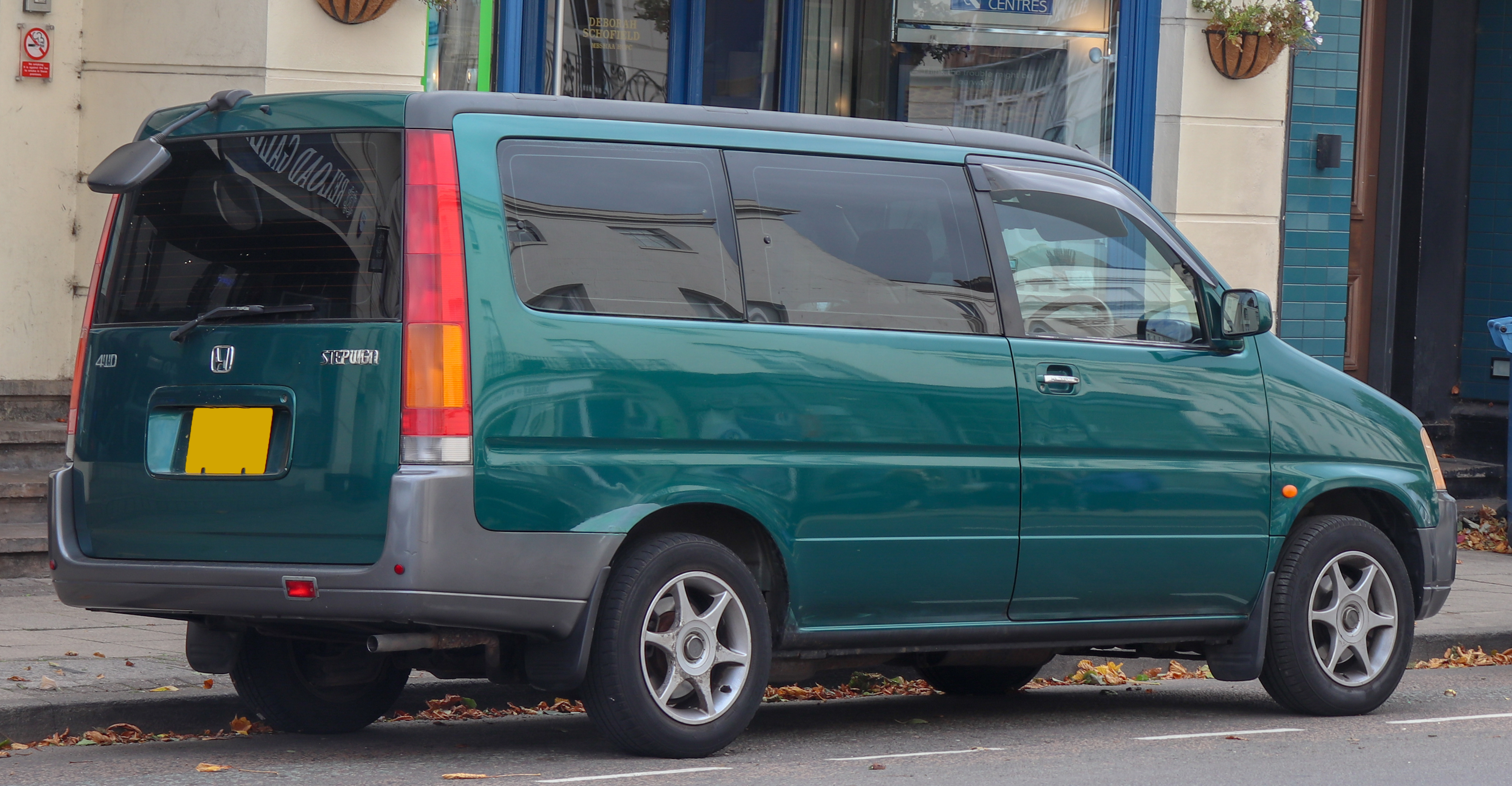
1997 Honda Stepwgn (pre-facelift)

=== F-MX (1995) ===
The first generation Stepwgn originally appeared at the Tokyo Motor Show as the F-MX in 1995.

=== Initial release (1996) ===
Japanese sales began on 8 May 1996. At that time, most Japanese minivans usually had the engine mounted under the cabin. The Stepwgn used a more conventional two-box layout, and was based on the Civic to reduce costs. The passenger side was fitted with a sliding door for easier access. To improve profitability, further cost reduction measures were used, such as there being only one engine and transmission option—a two-litre inline-four and a 4-speed automatic transmission—and the vehicle's design reduced the use of steel panels and parts.

=== 1997 update ===
Changes for 1997 included standardizing ABS and dual SRS airbags throughout the range, as well as the addition of a number of convenience features. Japanese models went on sale in August 1997 at Honda's Primo, Verno and Clio networks.

==== Stepwgn Almas (1997) ====
The Stepwgn Almas, whose name is derived from the Spanish alma ("heart"; "soul"), was equipped with a second-row seat lift for elderly and physically handicapped passengers.

==== Stepwgn Field Deck (1998) ====
A version of the Stepwgn with a pop-up observation tent and fibre-reinforced plastic (FRP) body, designed for outdoor leisure pursuits, was sold at Japanese Honda dealers from January 1998.

=== 1999 update ===
The Stepwgn received a facelift in May 1999. The appearance of the headlights was altered and the rear license plate was moved down.

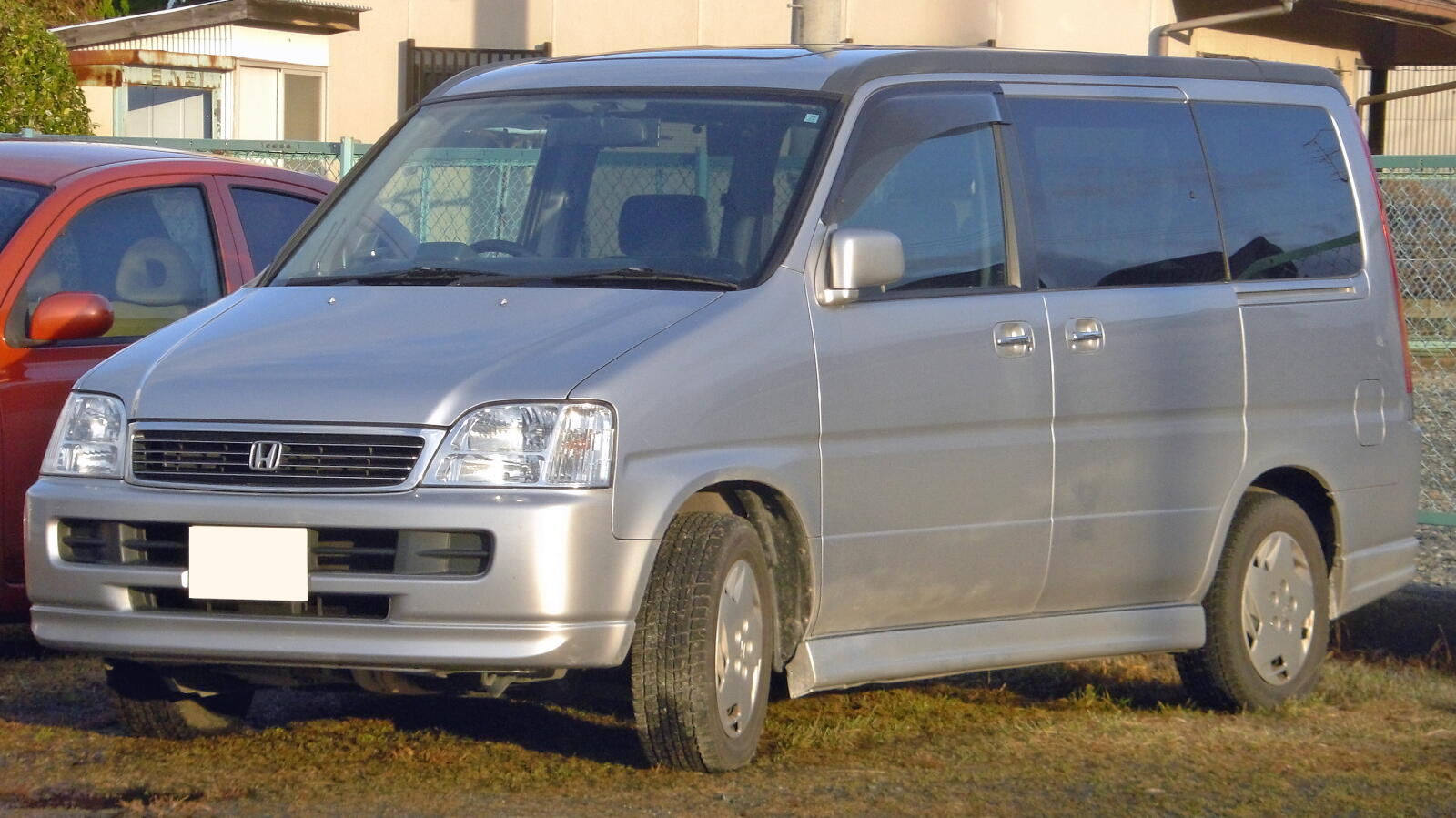
Honda Stepwgn (facelift)

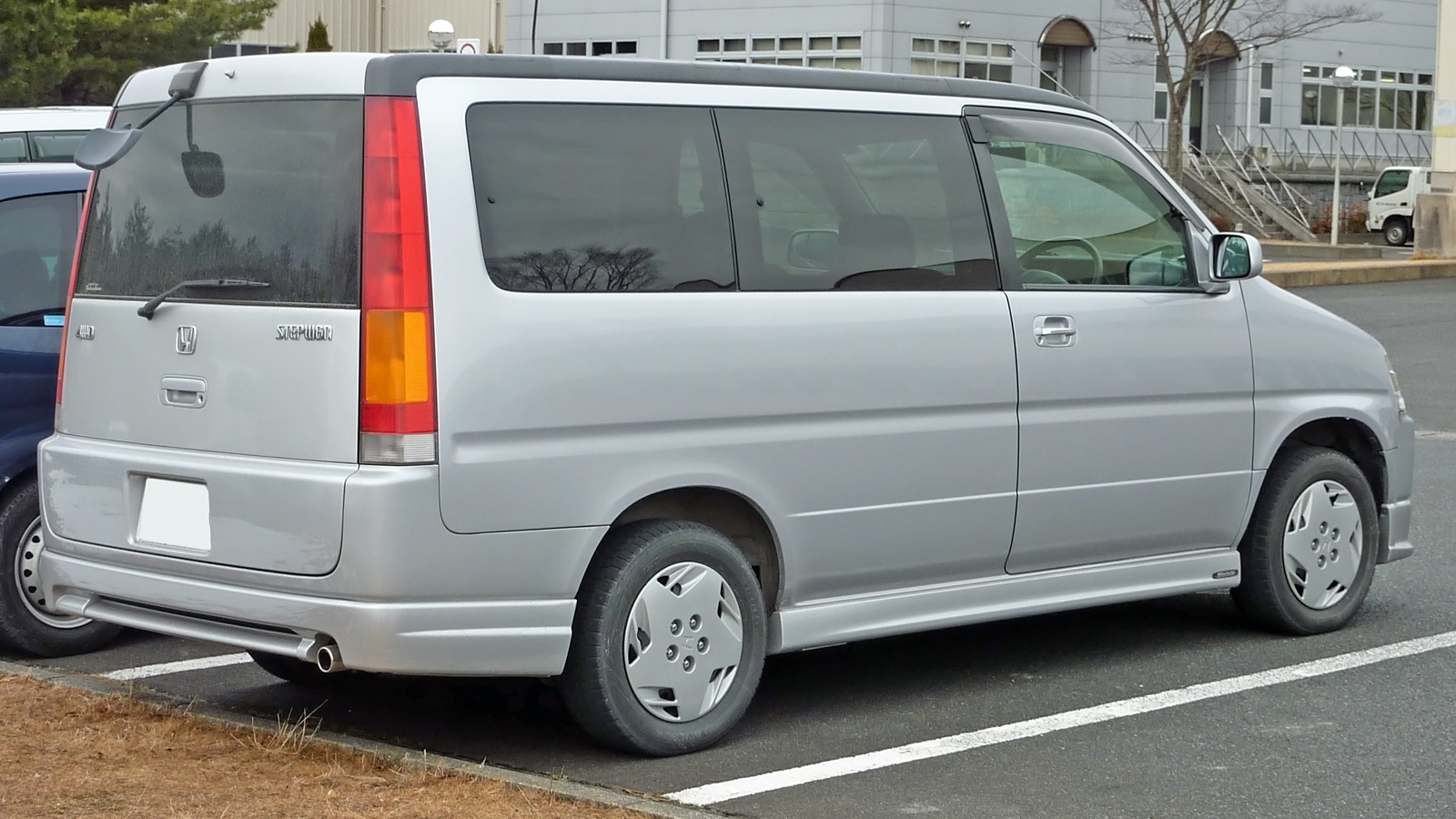
Honda Stepwgn (facelift)

== Second generation (RF3/4/5/6/7/8; 2001) ==
Second generation
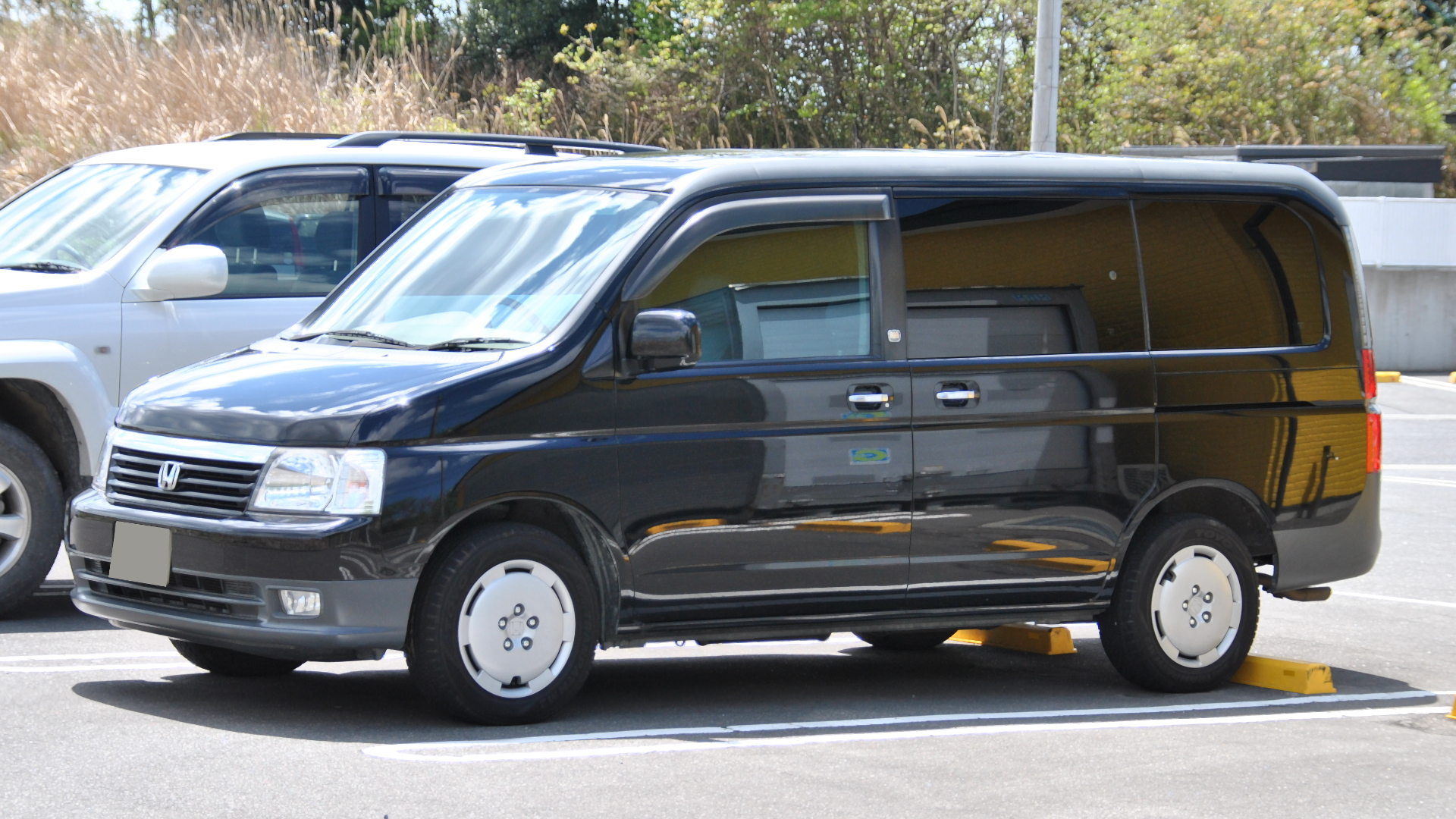
- Honda Stepwgn (pre-facelift)

Overview
- Model code: RF3/4/5/6/7/8
- Production: 2001–2005

Body and chassis
- Body style: 4-door minivan

Powertrain
- Engine: 2.0 L (122.0 cu in) K20A 160 PS (117.7 kW) I4; 2.4 L (146.5 cu in) K24A 162 PS (119.2 kW) I4
- Transmission: 4-speed automatic (2.0L); 5-speed automatic (2.4L)

Dimensions
- Wheelbase: 2,855 mm (112 in)
- Length: 4,705 mm (185 in)
- Width: 1,695 mm (67 in)
- Height: 1,815 mm (71 in)
- Curb weight: 1,490–1,620 kg (3,285–3,571 lb)

=== Initial release ===
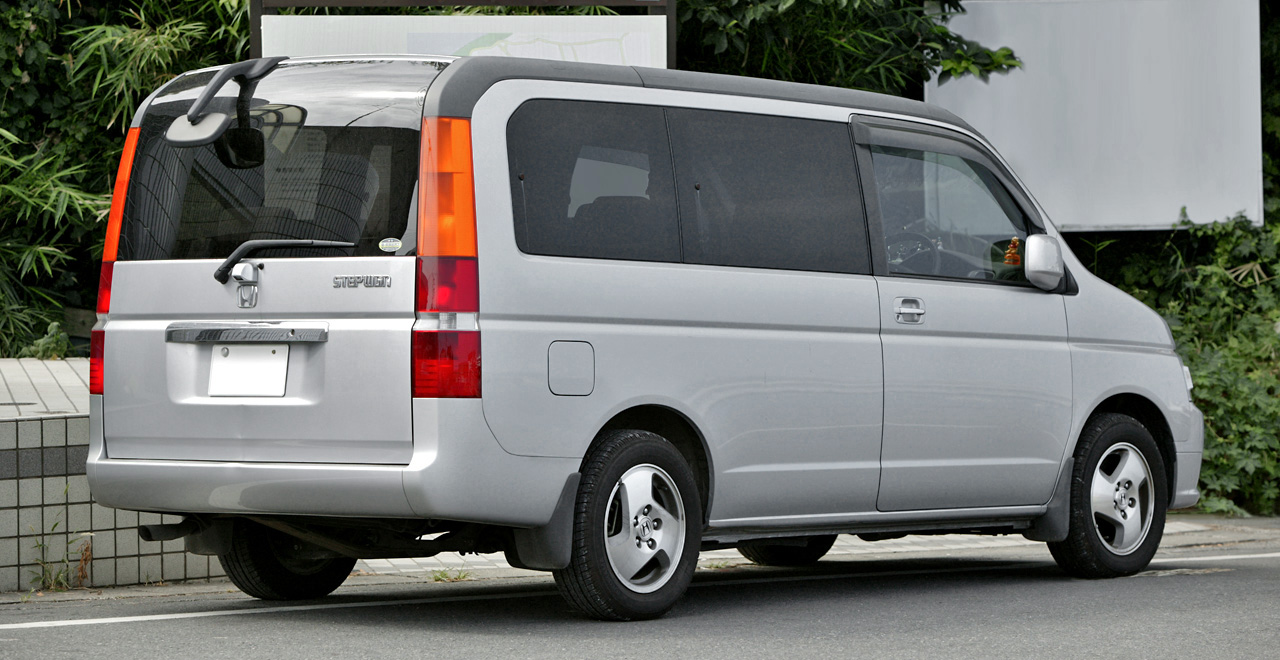
Honda Stepwgn (pre-facelift)

The second-generation Stepwgn debuted in April 2001, largely based on the first generation. It used a design geared towards families with children. The Stepwgn retained the sliding door located on one side, and its seating allowed for four different seating arrangements: "play mode" (sitting opposite each other), "food mode", "sleep mode", and "cargo mode" (wherein the second row of seats is folded flat). A 2.0L Honda K20A i-VTEC engine provided the second-generation Stepwgn with 160 PS (118 kW; 158 hp), improving both driving performance and fuel economy. Some parts were stiffened in order to further enhance driving performance.

The vehicle was unveiled at the 35th Tokyo Motor Show. In December 2002, the DeluXee A special edition was introduced, based on the D model with its body-coloured bumpers. The DeluXee had a different grille with a mesh insert, jacquard moquette seats, and a CD/MD player as standard. A second version, the DeluXee N, appeared in February 2003 incorporated a backup camera and a DVD-based navigation system but was otherwise identical.

==== Stepwgn Almas (2001) ====
In addition to the second-row seat lift, the 2001 Stepwgn Almas included a seat lift option for the front-row passenger. Stepwgn Almas models went on sale on 11 June 2001.

=== 2003 update ===
In June 2003, Honda significantly modified the design: both the front and rear fascias were altered to fit the look of other Honda vehicles, and the "Spada" series was introduced, available with slightly modified fender styling and a 2.4L K24A i-VTEC engine producing 162 PS (119 kW; 160 hp).

The vehicle was unveiled at the 37th Tokyo Motor Show in 2003.

For the first six months of 2004, sales of the Stepwgn in Japan reached 24,389 units.

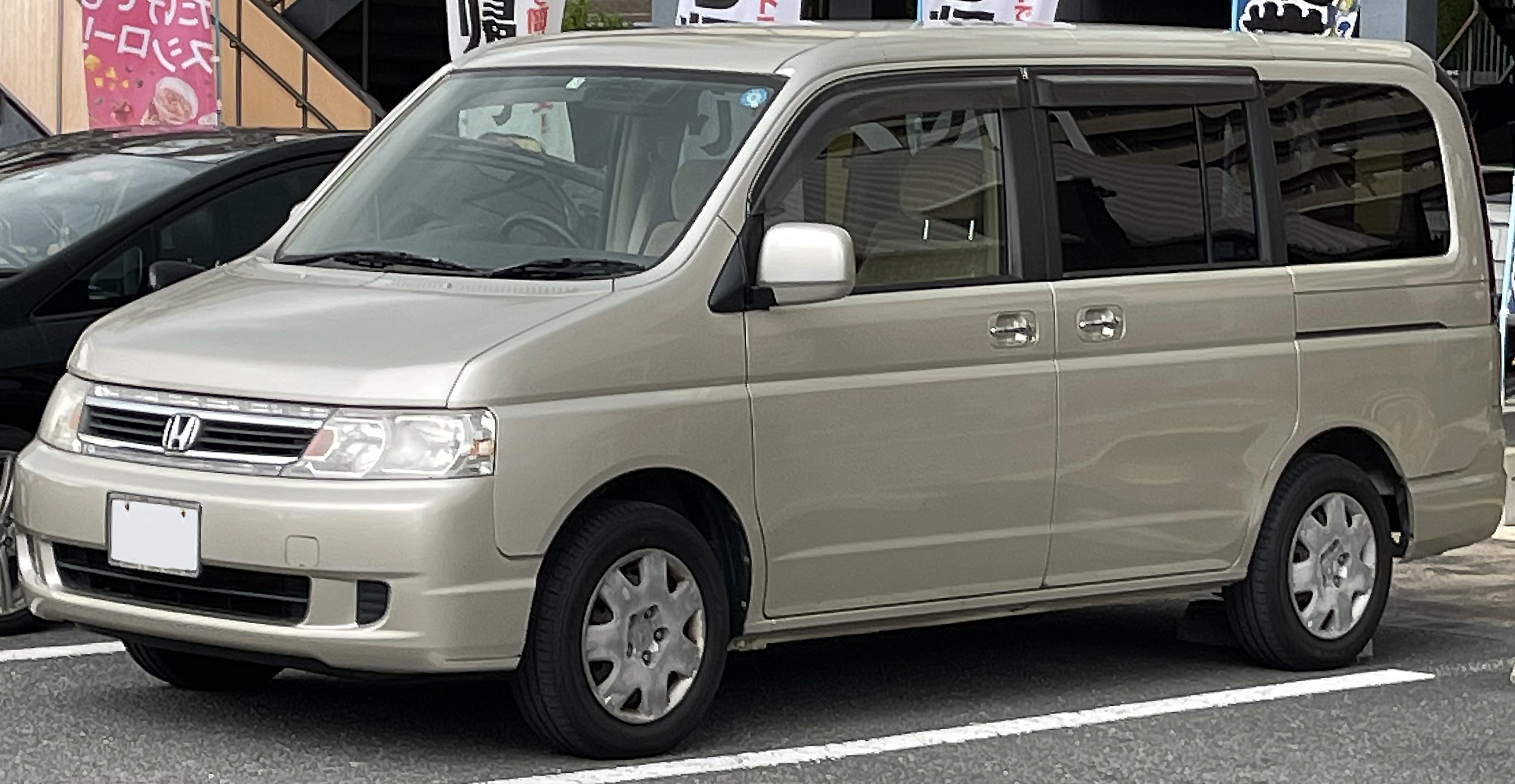
Honda Stepwgn (facelift)

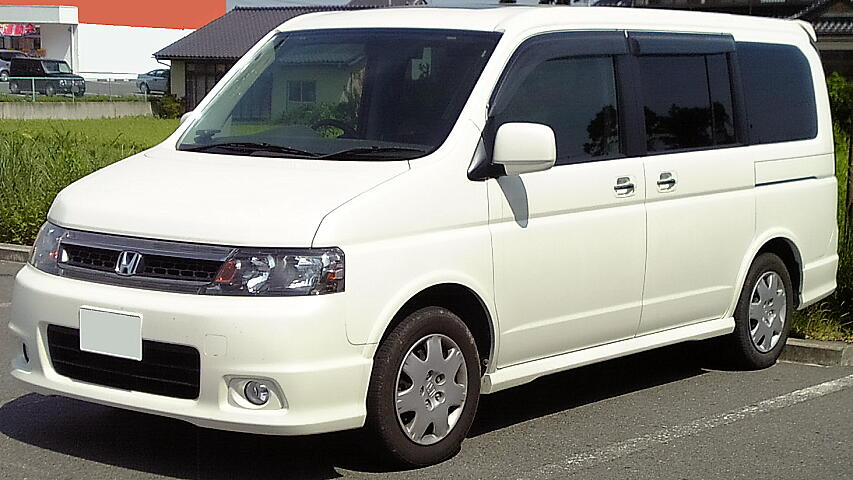
Honda Stepwgn Spada (facelift)

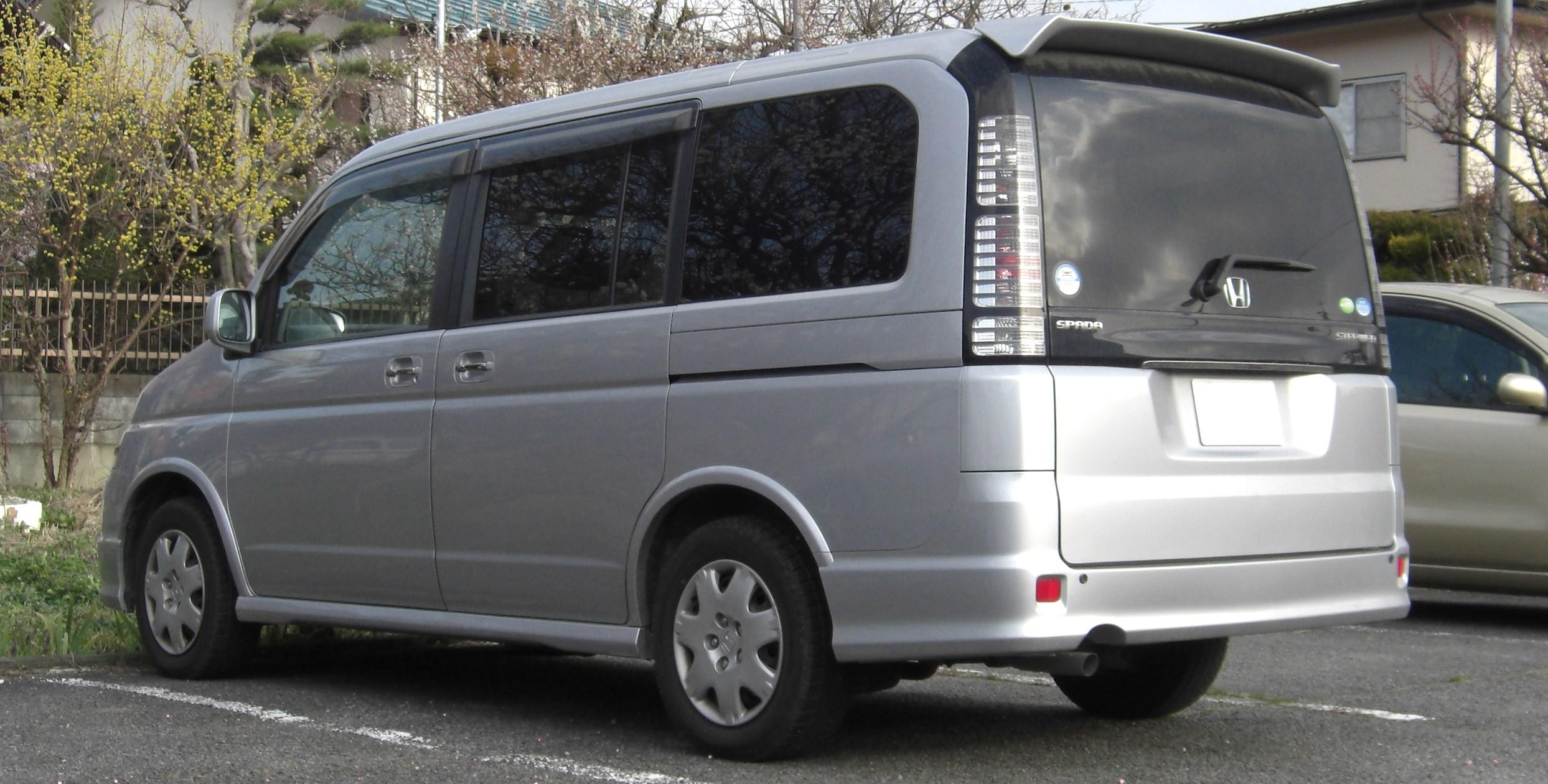
Honda Stepwgn Spada (facelift)

== Third generation (RG; 2005) ==
Third generation
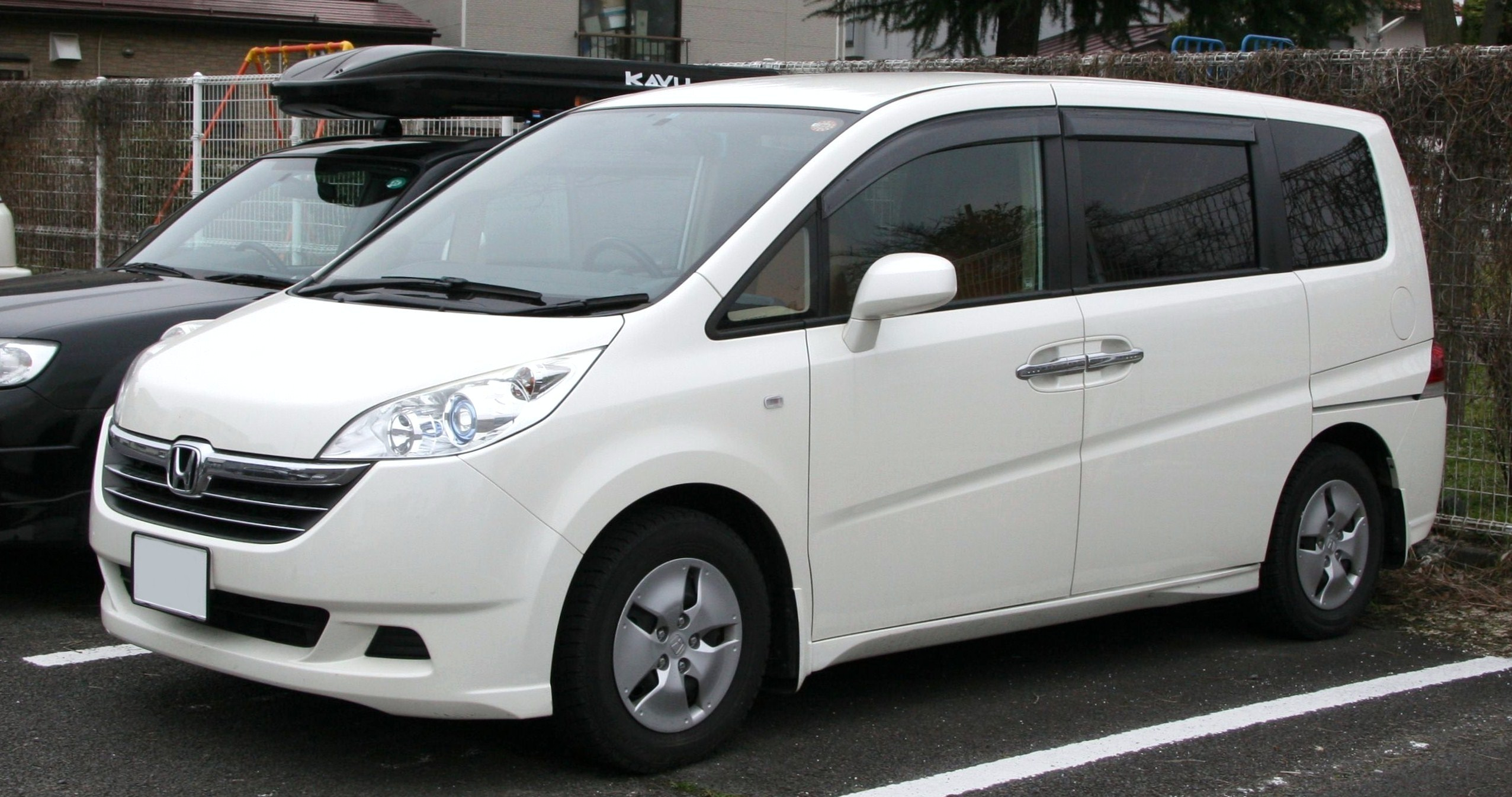
- 2005–2007 Honda Stepwgn (pre-facelift)

Overview
- Model code: RG
- Production: 2005–2009

Body and chassis
- Body style: 5-door minivan

Powertrain
- Engine: 2.0 L (122.0 cu in) K20A 155 PS (114.0 kW) I4; 2.4 L (146.5 cu in) 162 PS (119.2 kW) K24A I4
- Transmission: 4-speed automatic (2.0L); 5-speed automatic (2.4L 4WD); CVT (2.4L FWD)

Dimensions
- Wheelbase: 2,855 mm (112 in)
- Length: 4,630 mm (182 in)
- Width: 1,695 mm (67 in)
- Height: 1,770 mm (70 in)
- Curb weight: 1,540–1,660 kg (3,395–3,660 lb)

Announced on 26 May 2005, the third-generation Stepwgn had a more aerodynamic design compared its predecessors.

Unlike the previous generations, which only featured sliding doors on one side, the third generation featured sliding doors on both sides, in order to compete with other minivans such as the Nissan Serena and Toyota Noah. Although the size of the car was decreased, interior space remained unchanged thanks to a new low-floor chassis, which also improved the handling of the vehicle. The overall length had been shortened, though the platform retained the Civic-based design and employed a thin plastic fuel tank in order to provide a low floor, which was covered in panelling meant to evoke wood flooring. Japanese models went on sale on 27 May 2005 at Honda dealers.

The third-generation Stepwgn is powered by either a 2.0L K20A engine rated at 155 PS (114 kW), or a 2.4L K24A engine rated at 162 PS (119 kW). In the Stepwgn, they use a timing chain, as the engine is of an interference design. The 2.0L model retained a 4-speed automatic transmission, whilst the FWD 2.4L model was fitted with a CVT transmission.

For the month of November 2005, sales of Stepwgn in Japan reached 7,093 units.

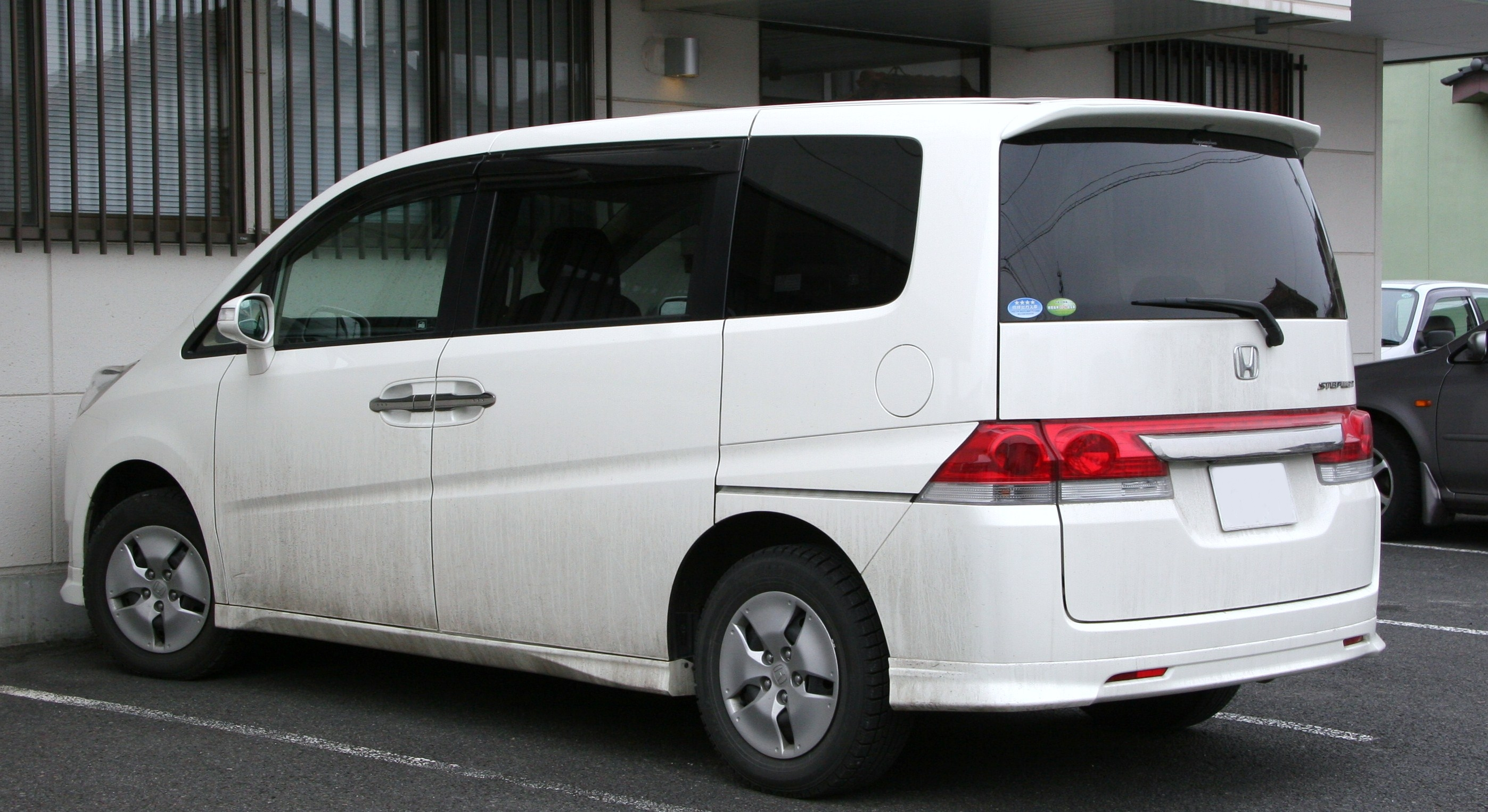
2005–2007 Honda Stepwgn (pre-facelift)

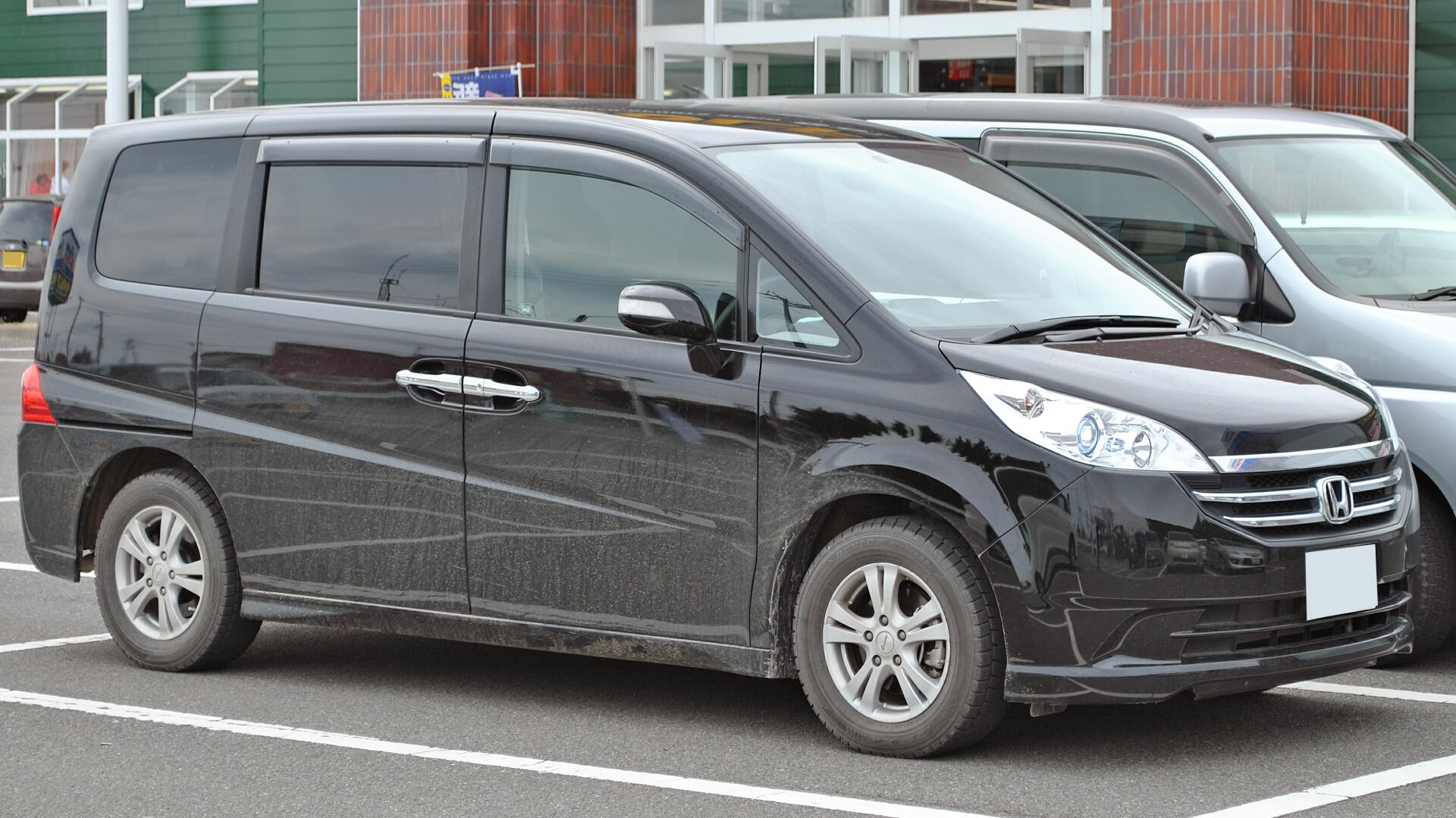
2007–2009 Honda Stepwgn (facelift)

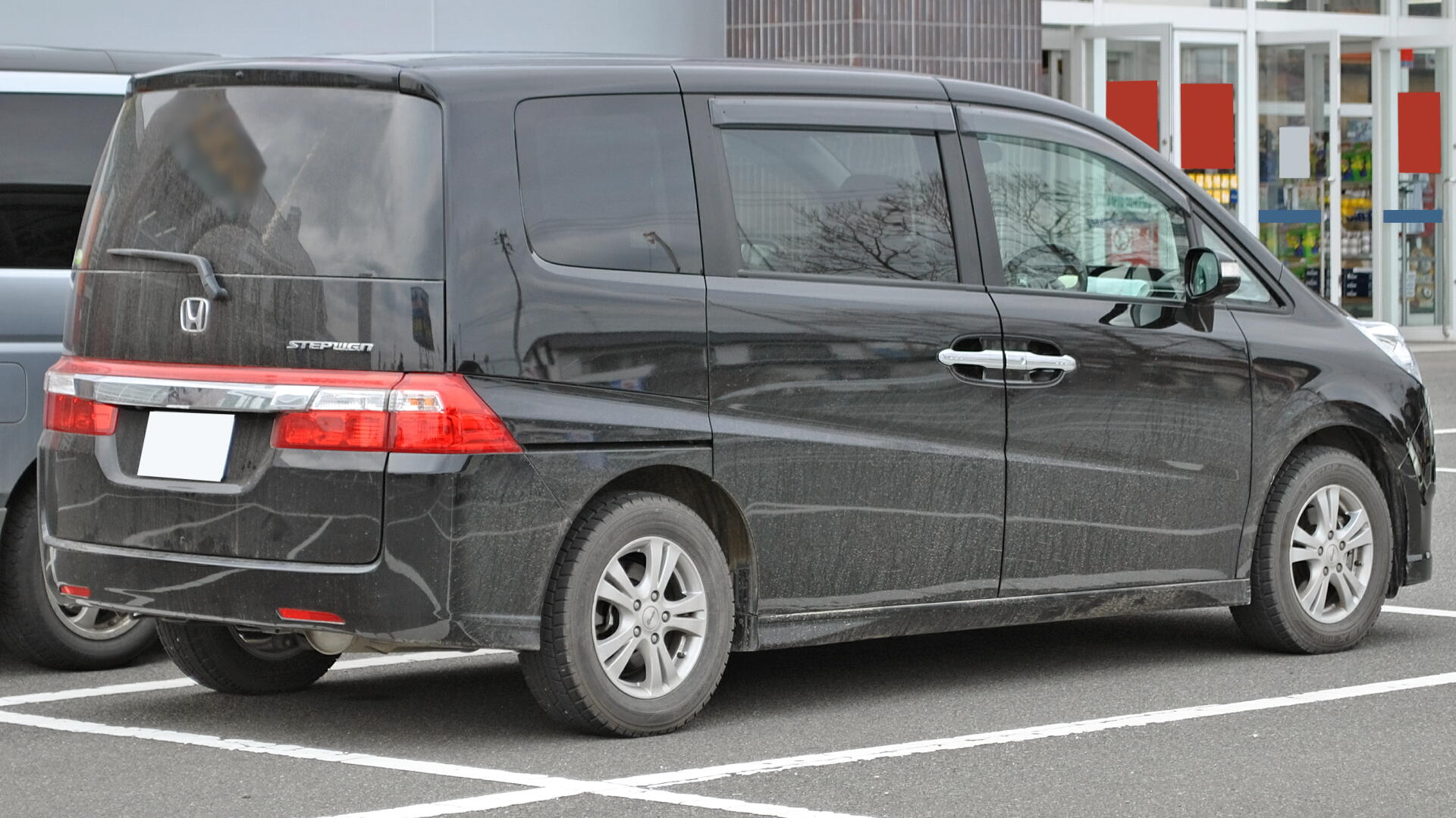
2007–2009 Honda Stepwgn (facelift)

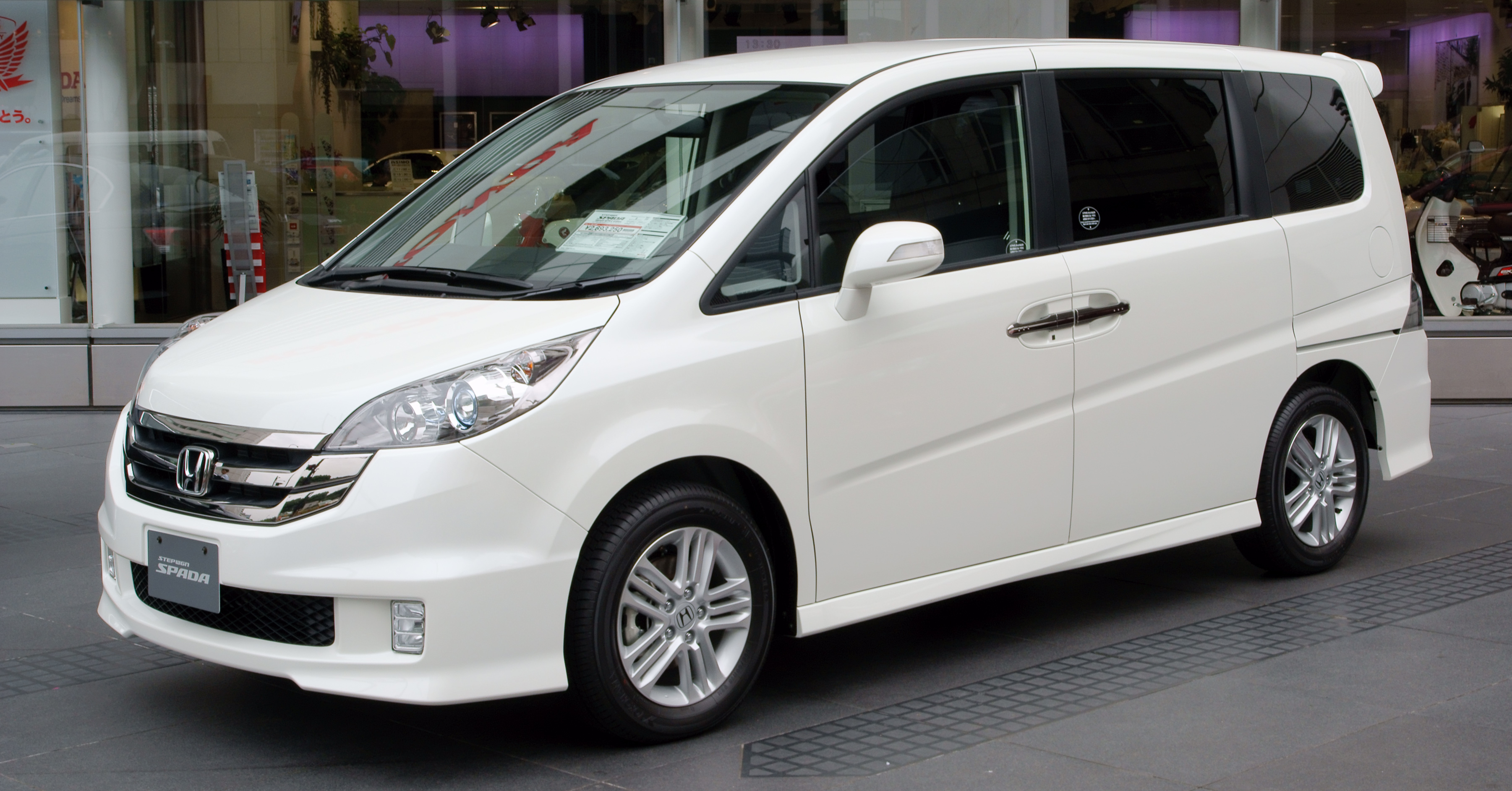
2007–2009 Honda Stepwgn Spada (facelift)

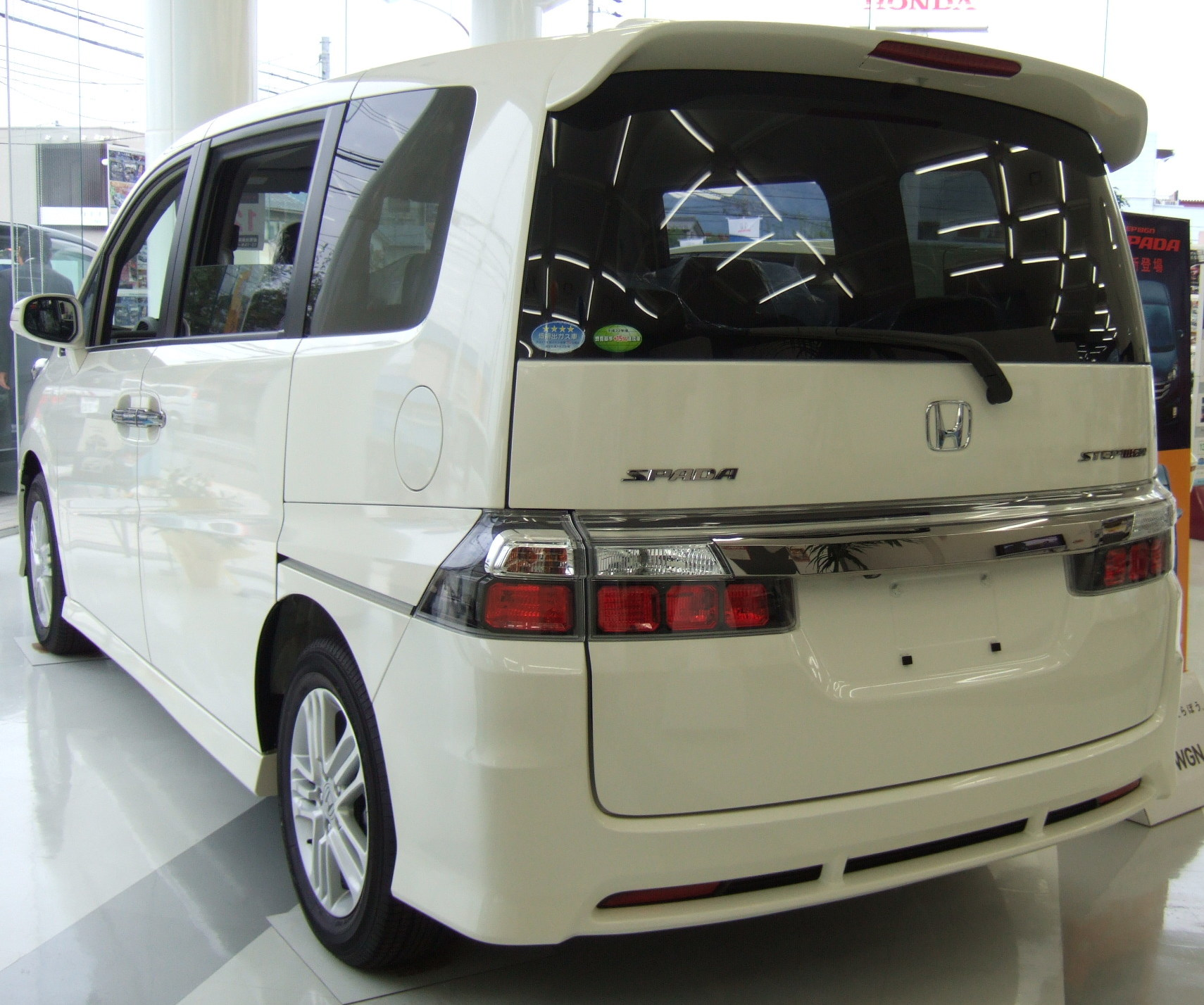
2007–2009 Honda Stepwgn Spada (facelift)

=== Tokyo Auto Salon concepts (2006) ===
The Modulo Stepwgn Concept and Stepwgn Modulo Concept X Final Room are concept cars based on the Stepwgn, with around-vehicle sensors. These vehicles were unveiled at the 2006 Tokyo Auto Salon.

=== 2006 update ===
For 2006, changes to the Stepwgn included:

- the addition of first- and second-row seat lift options to the G trim
- the inclusion of a power rear left sliding door as standard for the G, G S Package, and 24Z
- the inclusion of both power rear sliding doors as standard for the G L Package and G LS Package
- a new setting for the smart key system (with 2 keys)
- hydrophilic/heated side-view mirrors and hydrophobic front door glass

Japanese models went on sale in May 2006.

== Fourth generation (RK; 2009) ==
Fourth generation
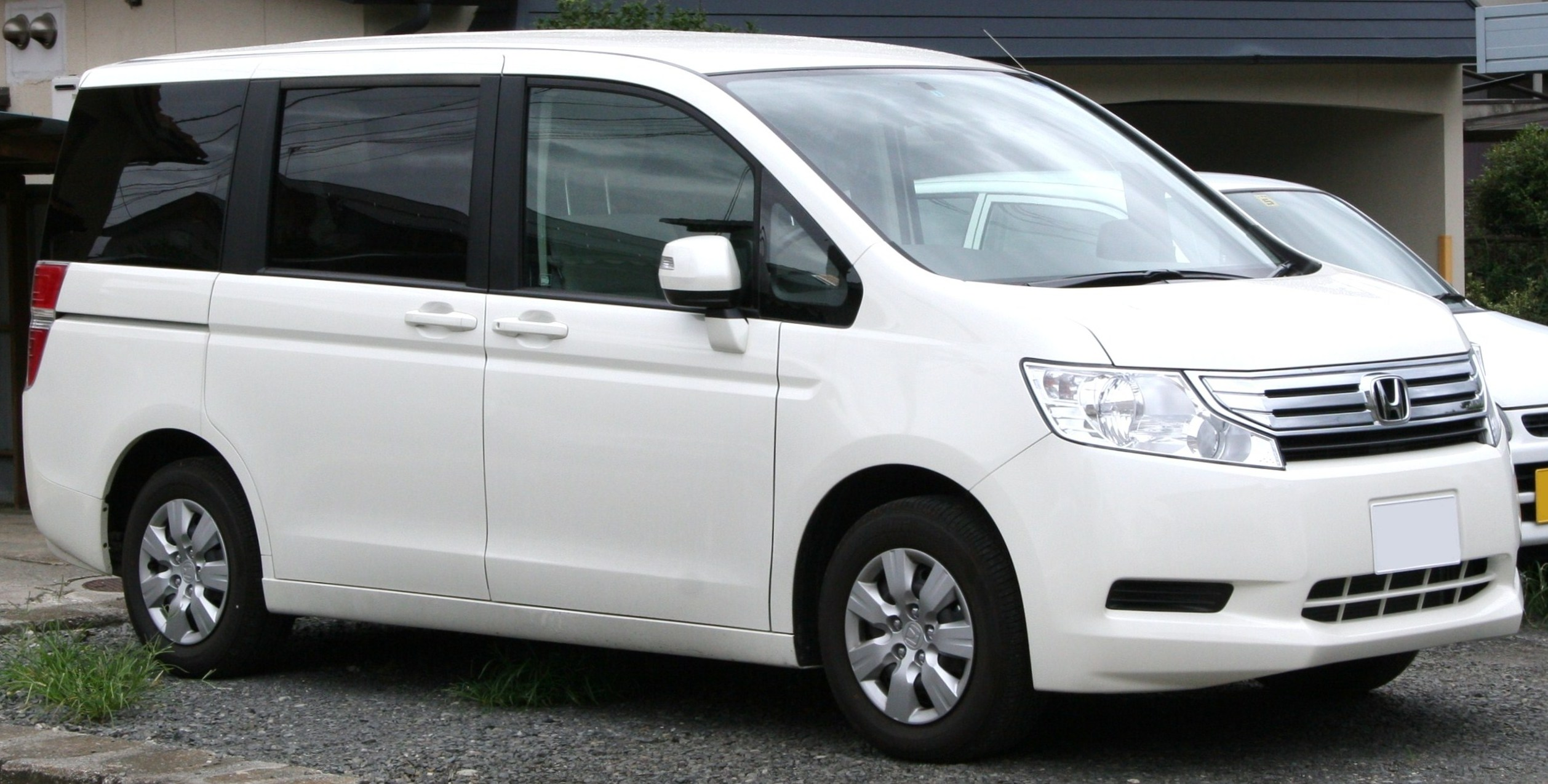
- Honda Stepwgn (pre-facelift)

Overview
- Model code: RK
- Production: 2009–2015

Body and chassis
- Body style: 5-door minivan

Powertrain
- Engine: 2.0 L (122 cu in) R20A 150 PS (110.3 kW) I4
- Transmission: 5-speed automatic CVT

Dimensions
- Wheelbase: 2,855 mm (112 in)
- Length: 4,690 mm (185 in)
- Width: 1,695 mm (67 in)
- Height: 1,815 mm (71 in)
- Curb weight: 1,580–1,750 kg (3,483–3,858 lb)

The fourth generation Stepwgn was a full redesign of the model, increasing in height and length but remaining the same width. The Stepwgn Spada model returned with a unique grille and headlamp design, and with clear rather than red taillights. The fourth-generation Stepwgn was available in seven trim levels: G, G L Package, L, Li, Spada S, Spada Z, and Spada Zi. The 2.4-litre engine was dropped from the lineup, with only a 2.0-litre remaining available. The Stepwgn was available with either front- or four-wheel-drive across the range.

Japanese models went on sale in October 2009.

For the month of July 2013, sales of the Stepwgn reached 6,715 units.

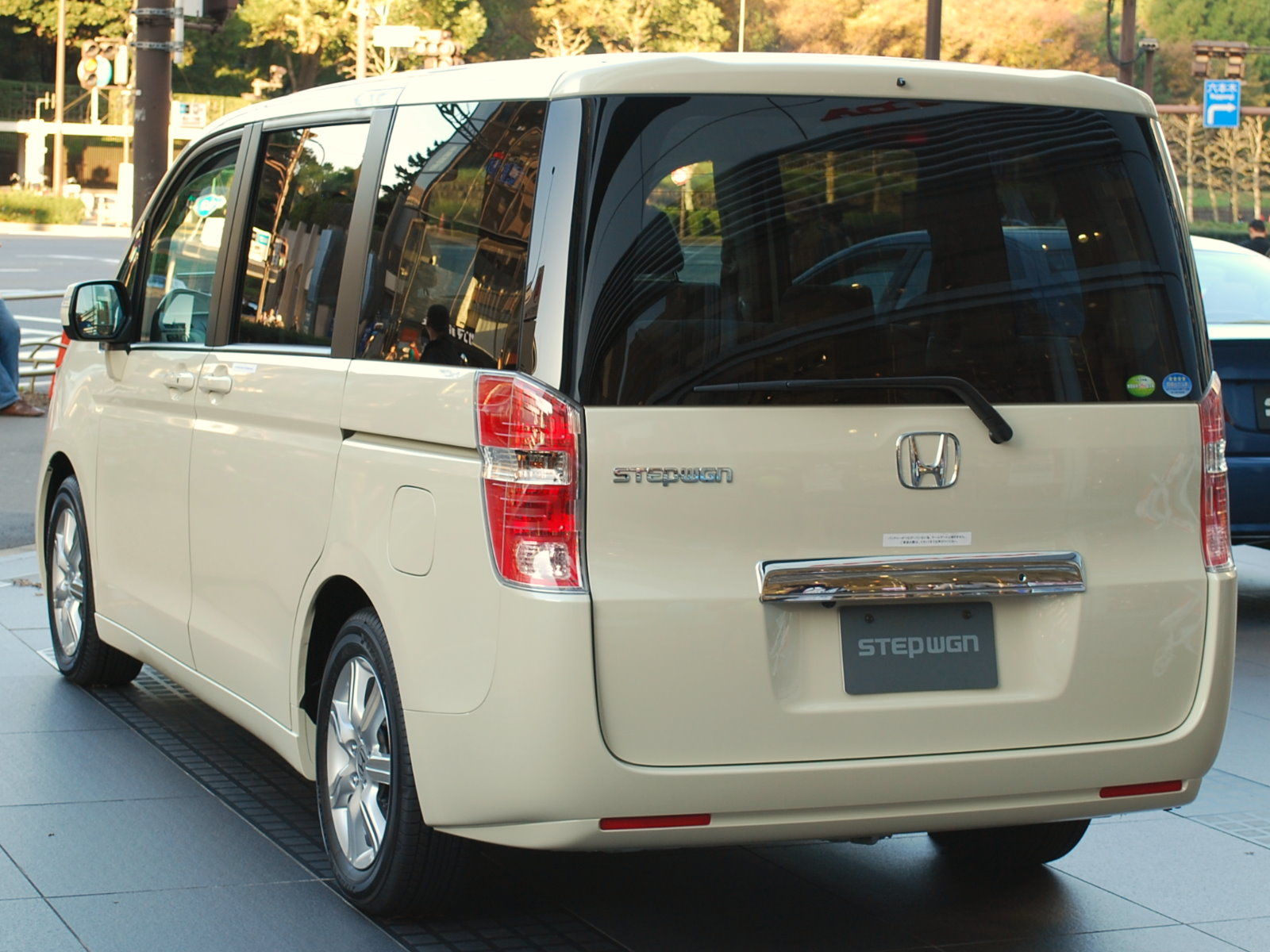
2009 Honda Stepwgn (pre-facelift)

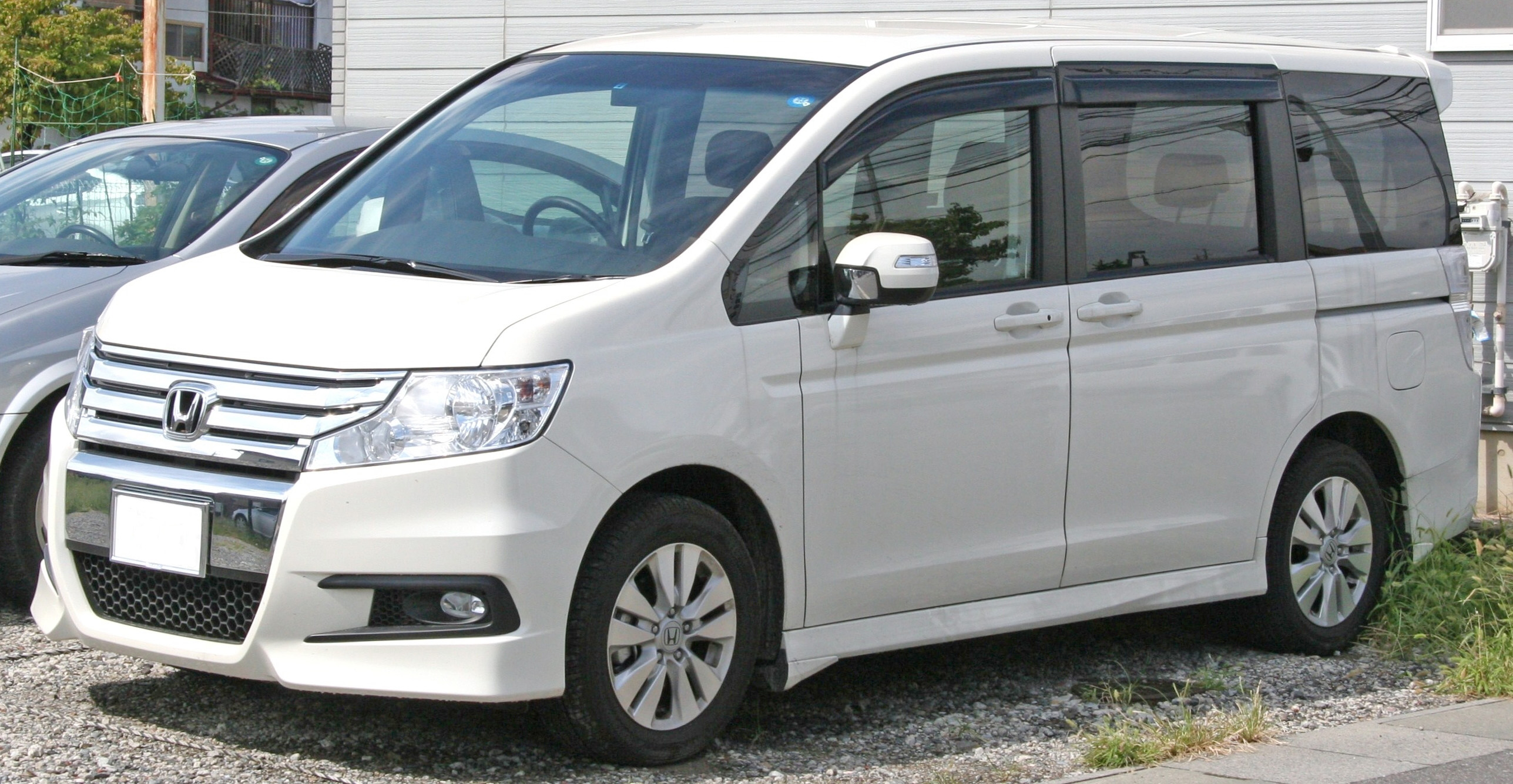
Honda Stepwgn Spada (pre-facelift)

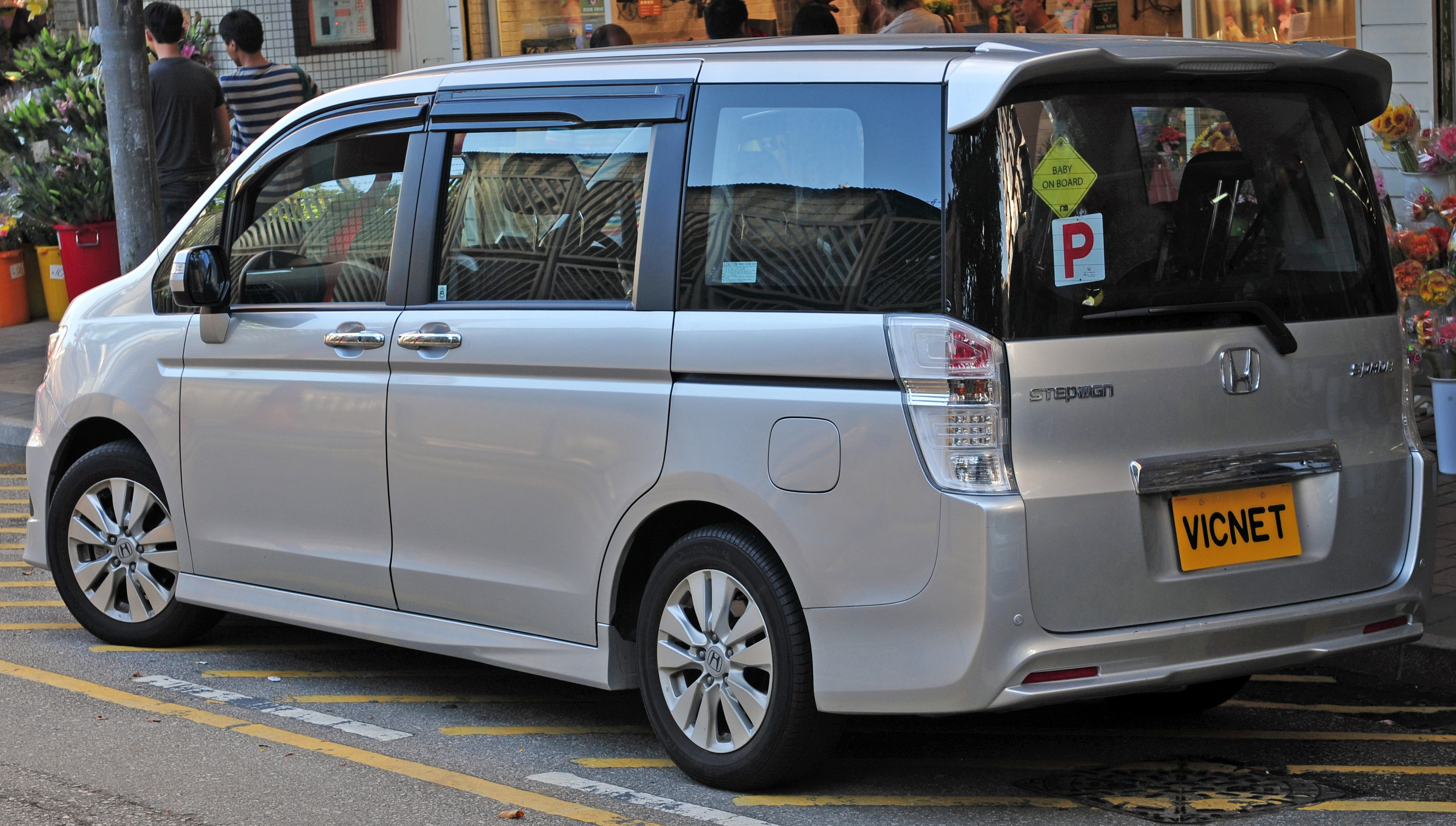
Honda Stepwgn Spada (pre-facelift)

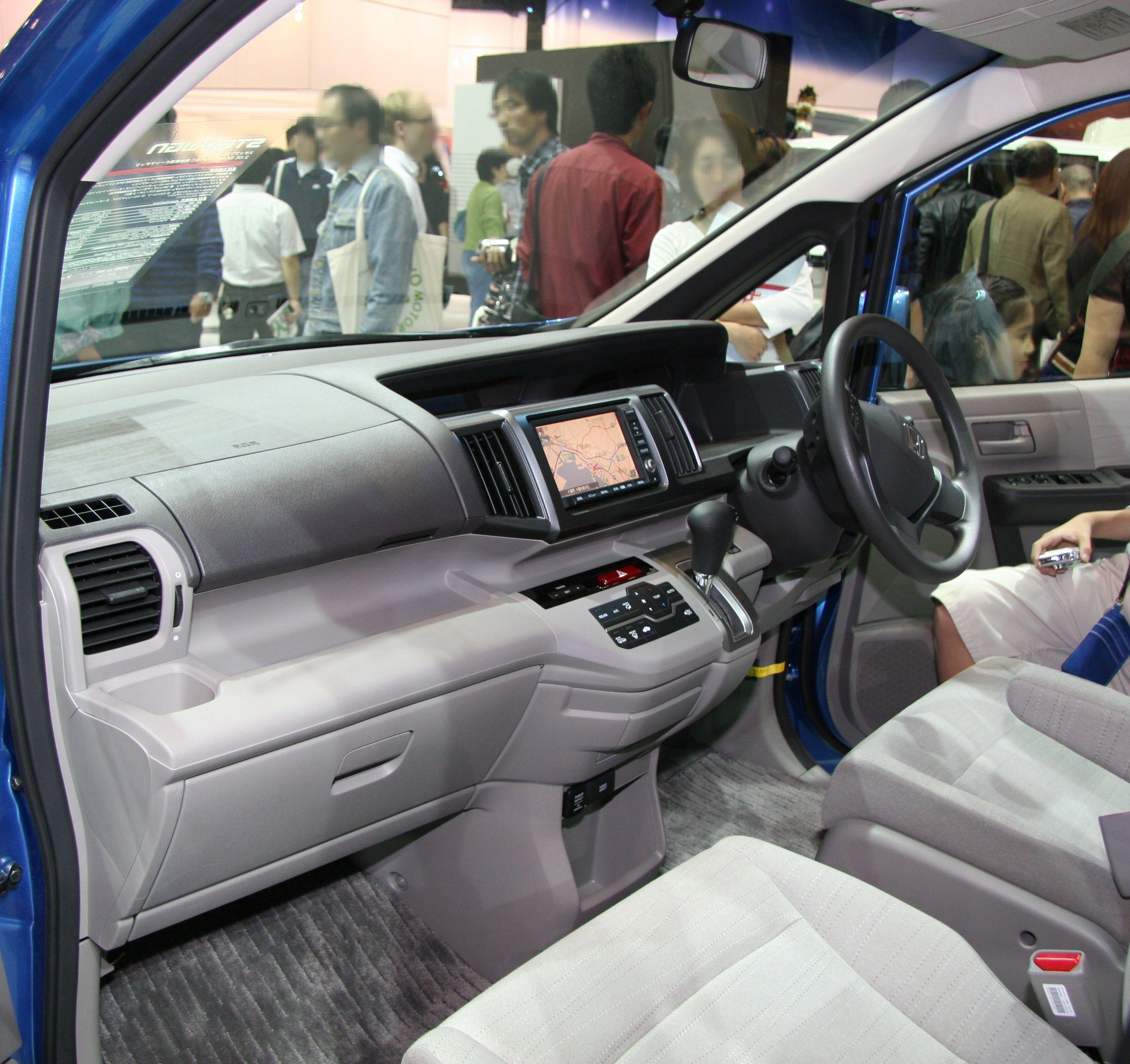
Interior

=== Modulo Stepwgn (2010) ===
The Modulo Stepwgn is a production vehicle based on the standard Stepwgn. The vehicle was unveiled at the 2010 Tokyo Auto Salon.

=== 2012 facelift ===
In 2012, there were minor changes to the Stepwgn, including a new front grille, front bumper, rear lights, and wheels. A parking camera was also made standard equipment on all models.

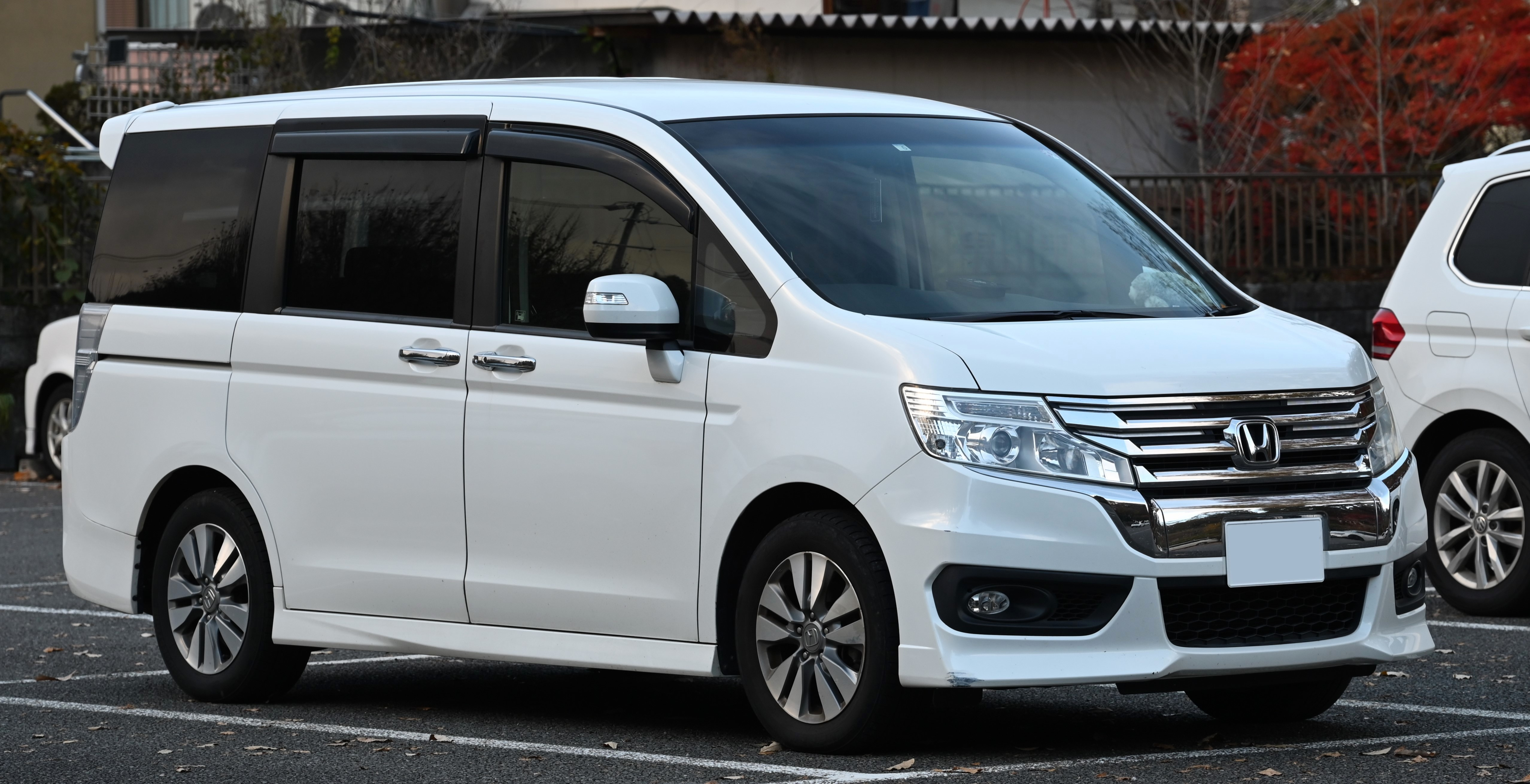
Honda Stepwgn Spada (facelift)

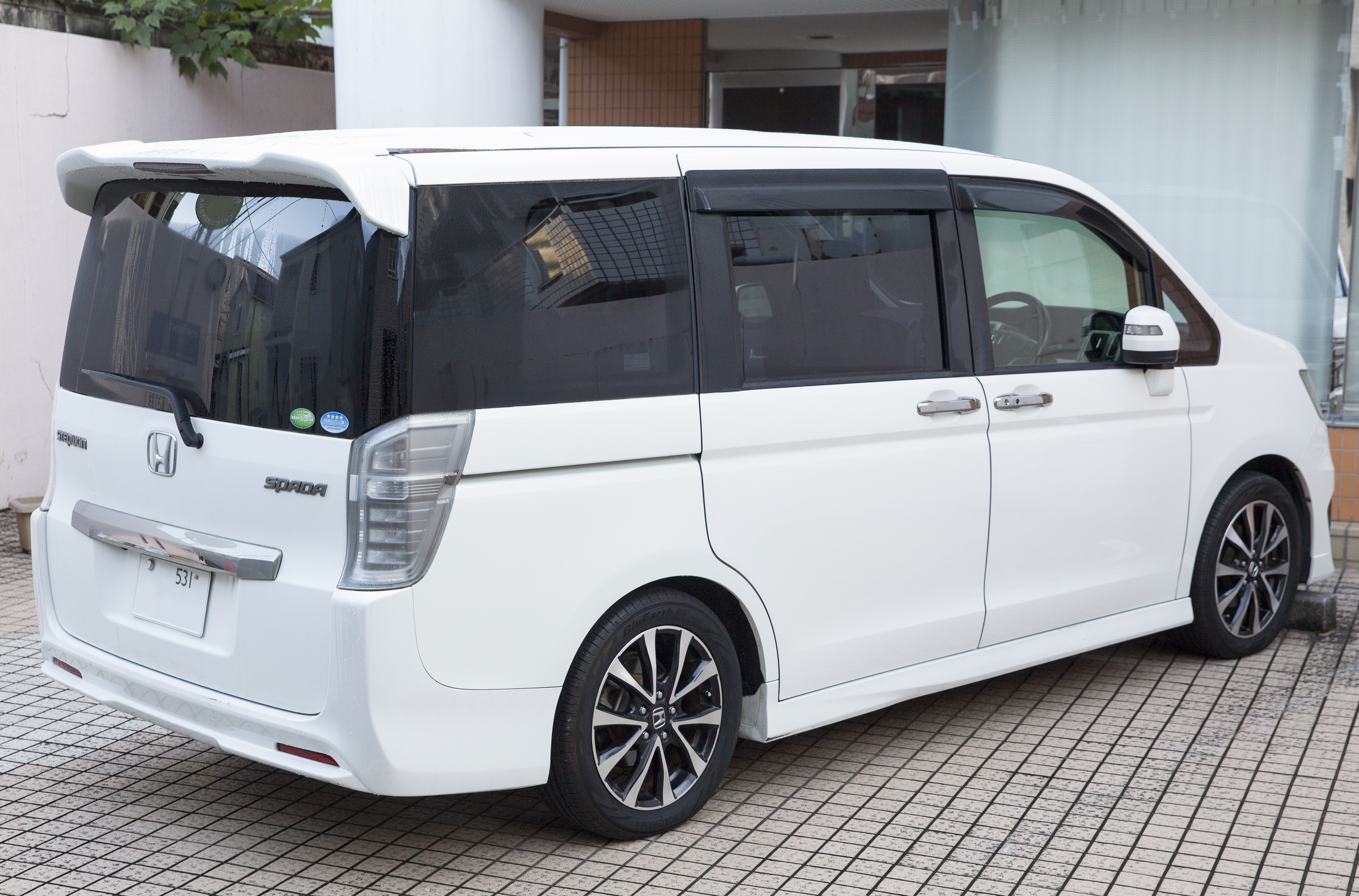
Honda Stepwgn Spada (facelift)

==== Stepwgn Modulo Style (2013) ====
The Stepwgn Modulo Style was a concept vehicle based on the standard Stepwgn. The vehicle was unveiled at the 2013 Tokyo Auto Salon.

== Fifth generation (RP1–5; 2015) ==
Fifth generation
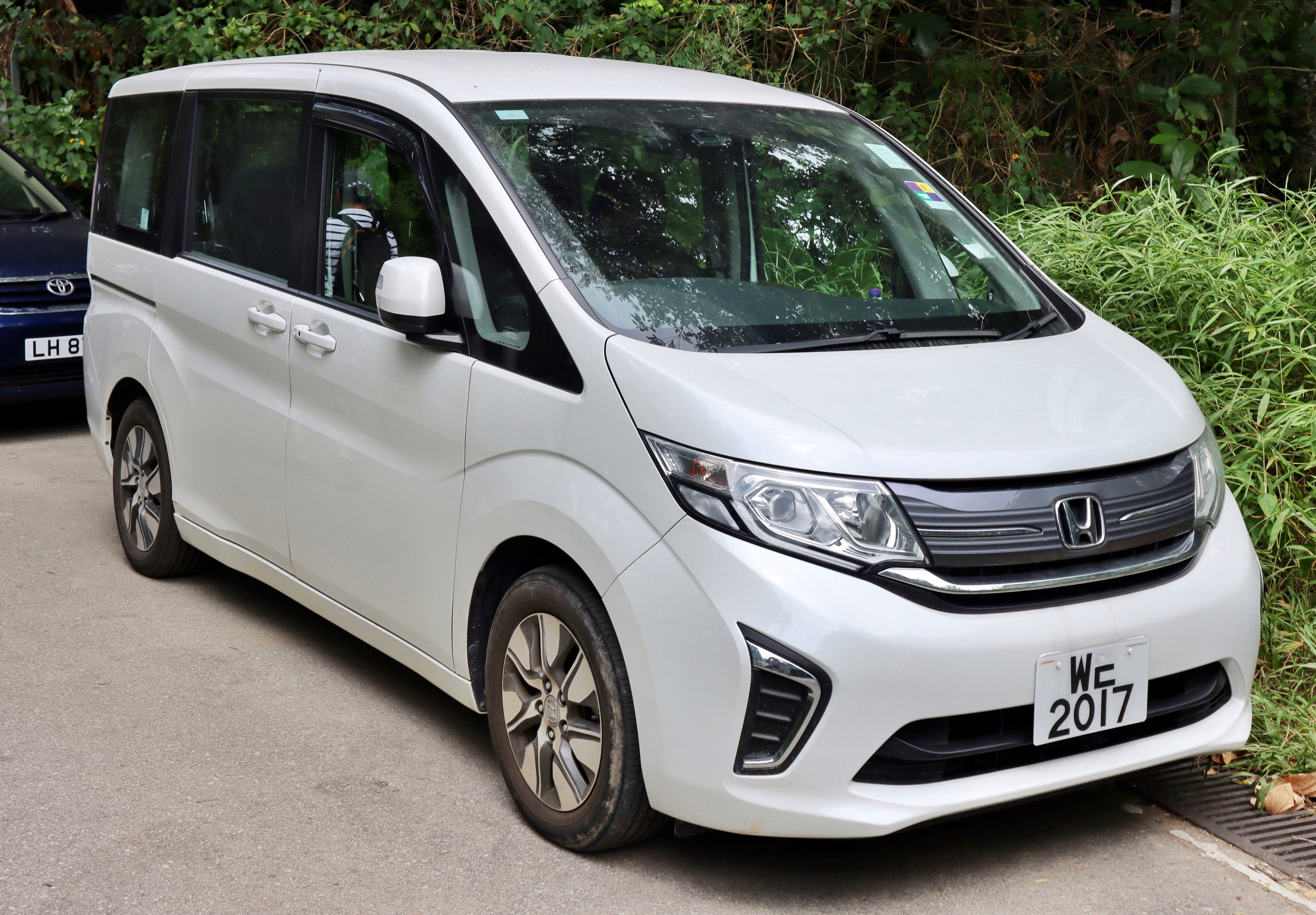
- 2015 Honda Stepwgn (RP3; pre-facelift)

Overview
- Model code: RP1–5
- Production: 2015–2022

Body and chassis
- Body style: 5-door minivan

Powertrain
- Engine: 1.5L L15BF turbocharged I4; 2.0 L LFA1/LFB1 PGM-FI DOHC i-VTEC I4 + 2 electric motors
- Electric motor: 2x Permanent Magnet Motors
- Power output: 110 kW (150 PS; 148 hp) (); 158 kW (215 PS; 212 hp) (Hybrid / e:HEV)
- Transmission: CVT
- Hybrid drivetrain: Honda Sport Hybrid Intelligent Multi Mode Drive (i-MMD)

Dimensions
- Wheelbase: 2,890 mm (114 in)
- Length: 4,690 mm (185 in); 4,760 mm (187 in) (Spada)
- Width: 1,695 mm (67 in)
- Height: 1,840–1,855 mm (72–73 in)
- Curb weight: 1,630–1,770 kg (3,594–3,902 lb)

The fifth generation Stepwgn was introduced in April 2015. With an all-new 1.5-litre direct injection VTEC Turbo engine, the fifth generation Stepwgn features a functional cabin space, as well as a novel two-way tailgate called the Waku Waku Gate, derived from the Japanese term wakuwaku (わくわく; "exciting"). The Waku Waku Gate either functions as a traditional upwards-opening tailgate, or a smaller door that opens to the side for easier third-row access and cargo loading.

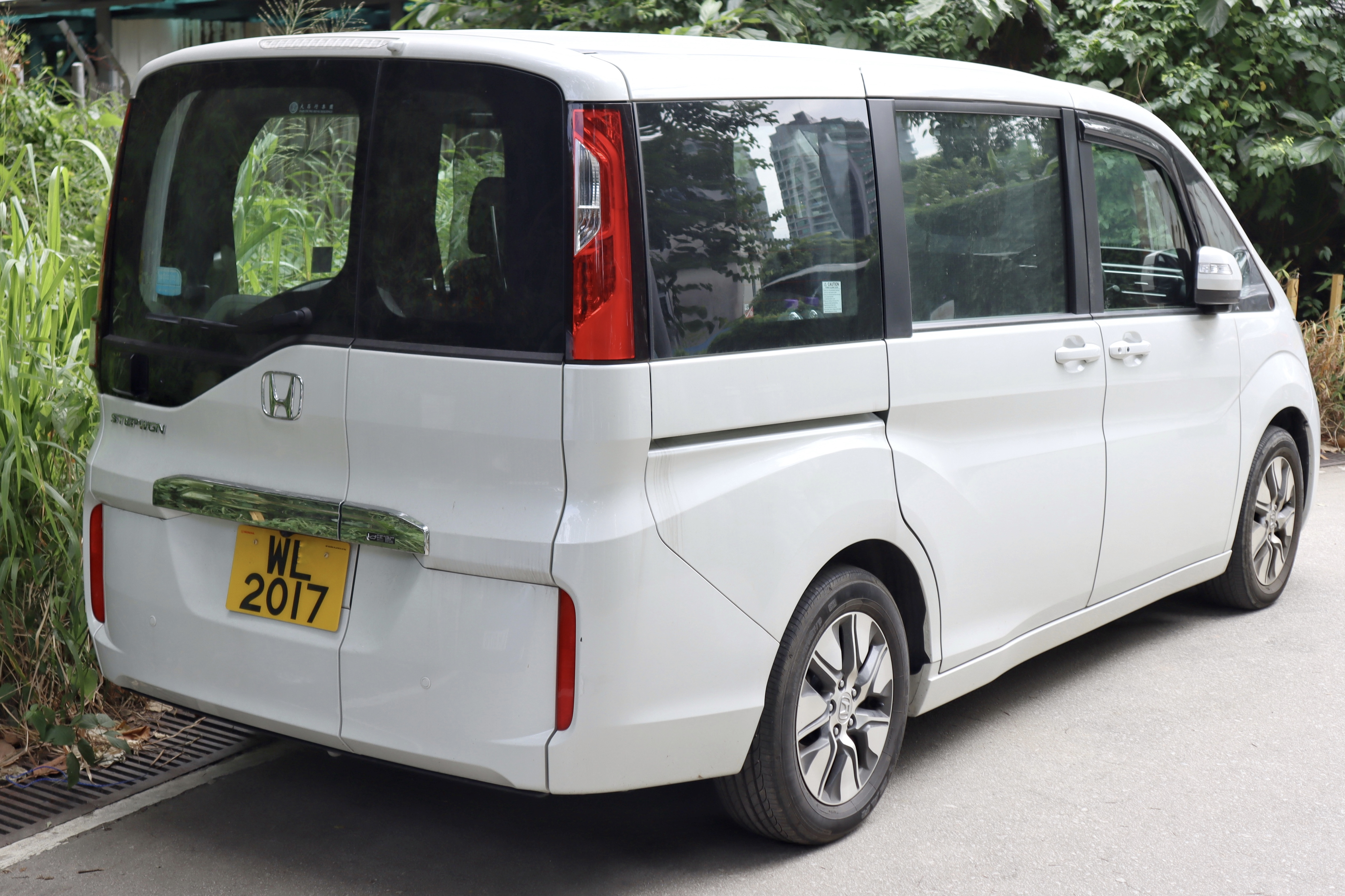
2015 Honda Stepwgn (RP3; pre-facelift)

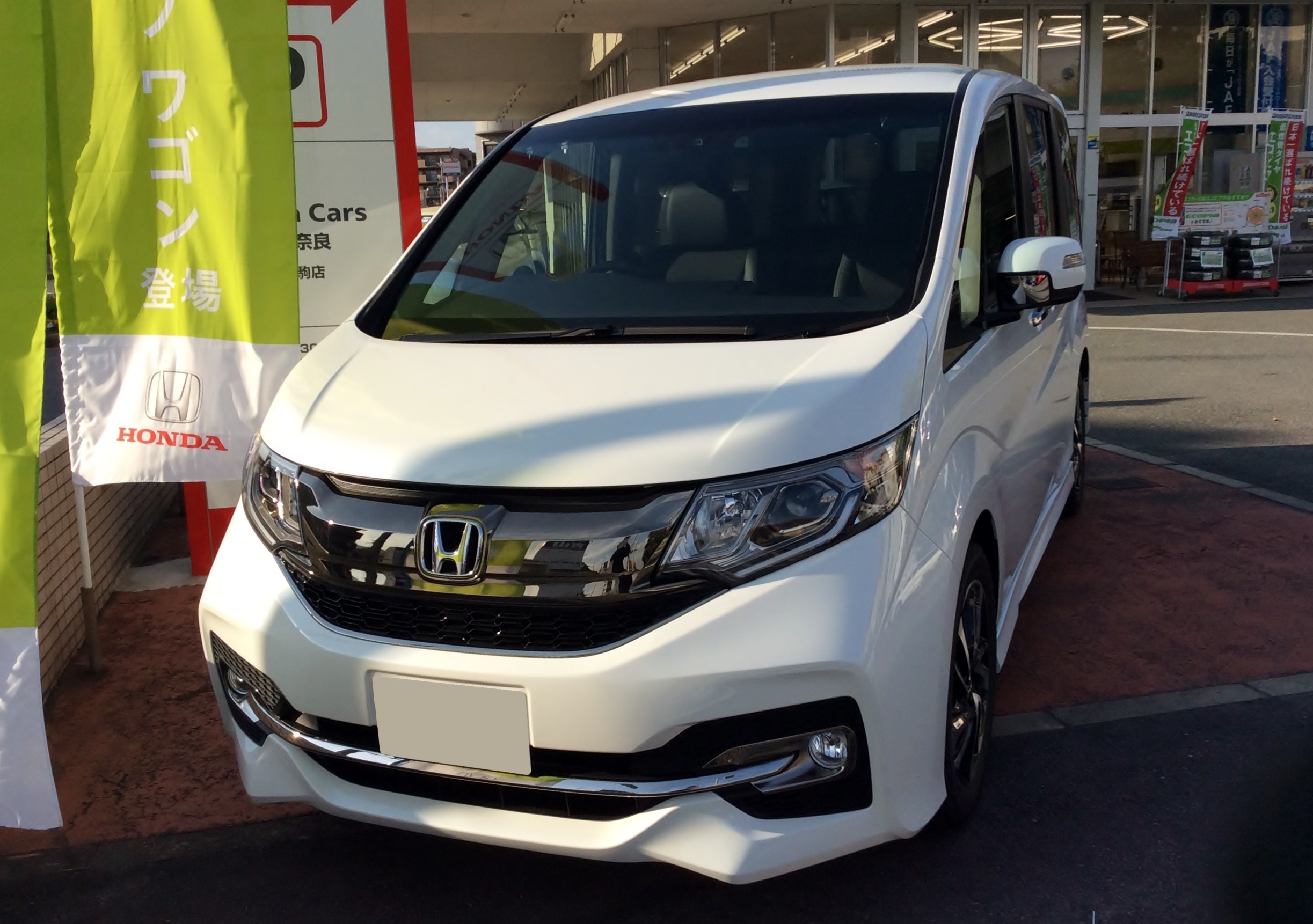
Honda Stepwgn Spada Cool Spirit (RP3; pre-facelift)

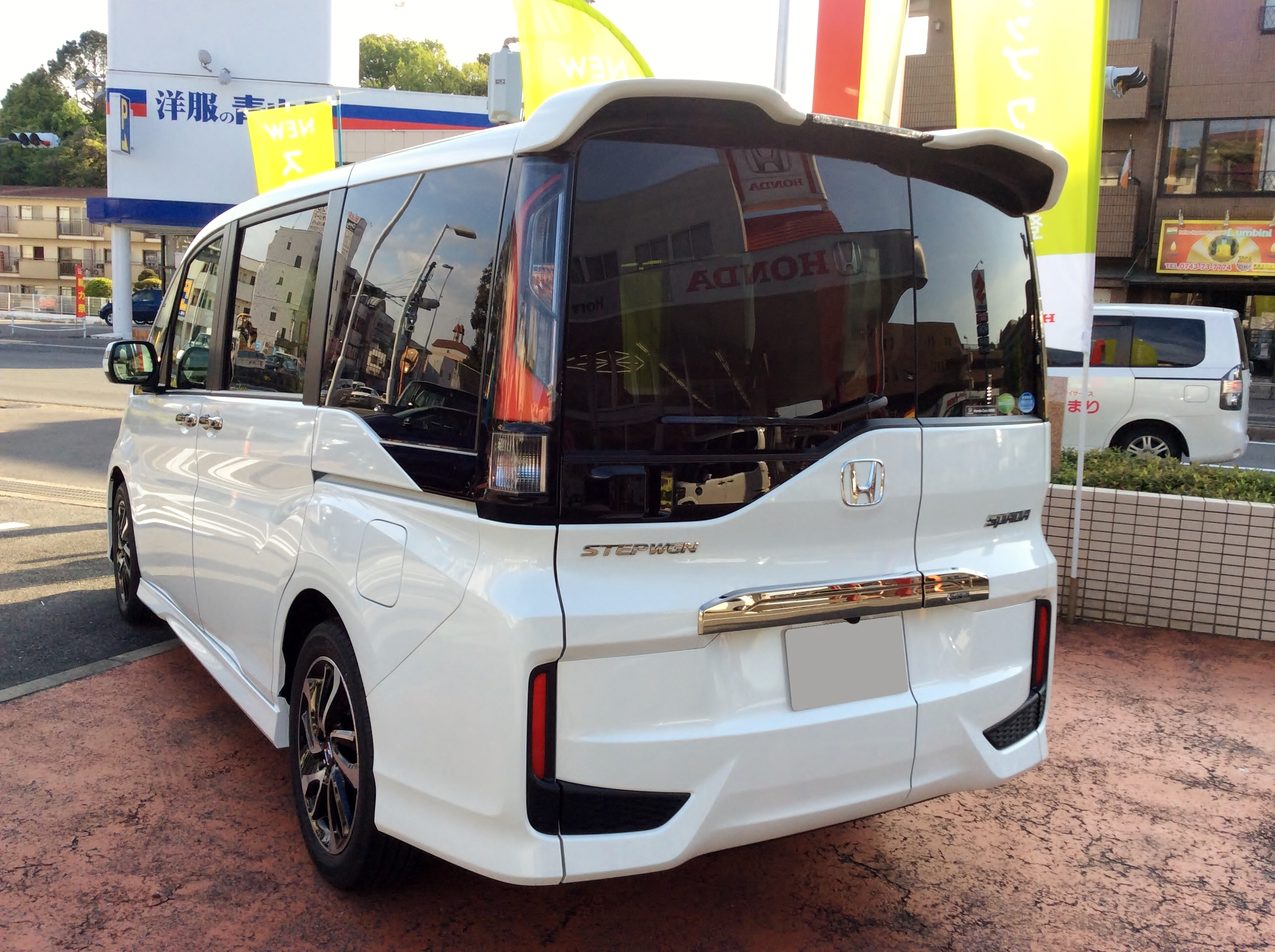
Honda Stepwgn Spada Cool Spirit (RP3; pre-facelift)

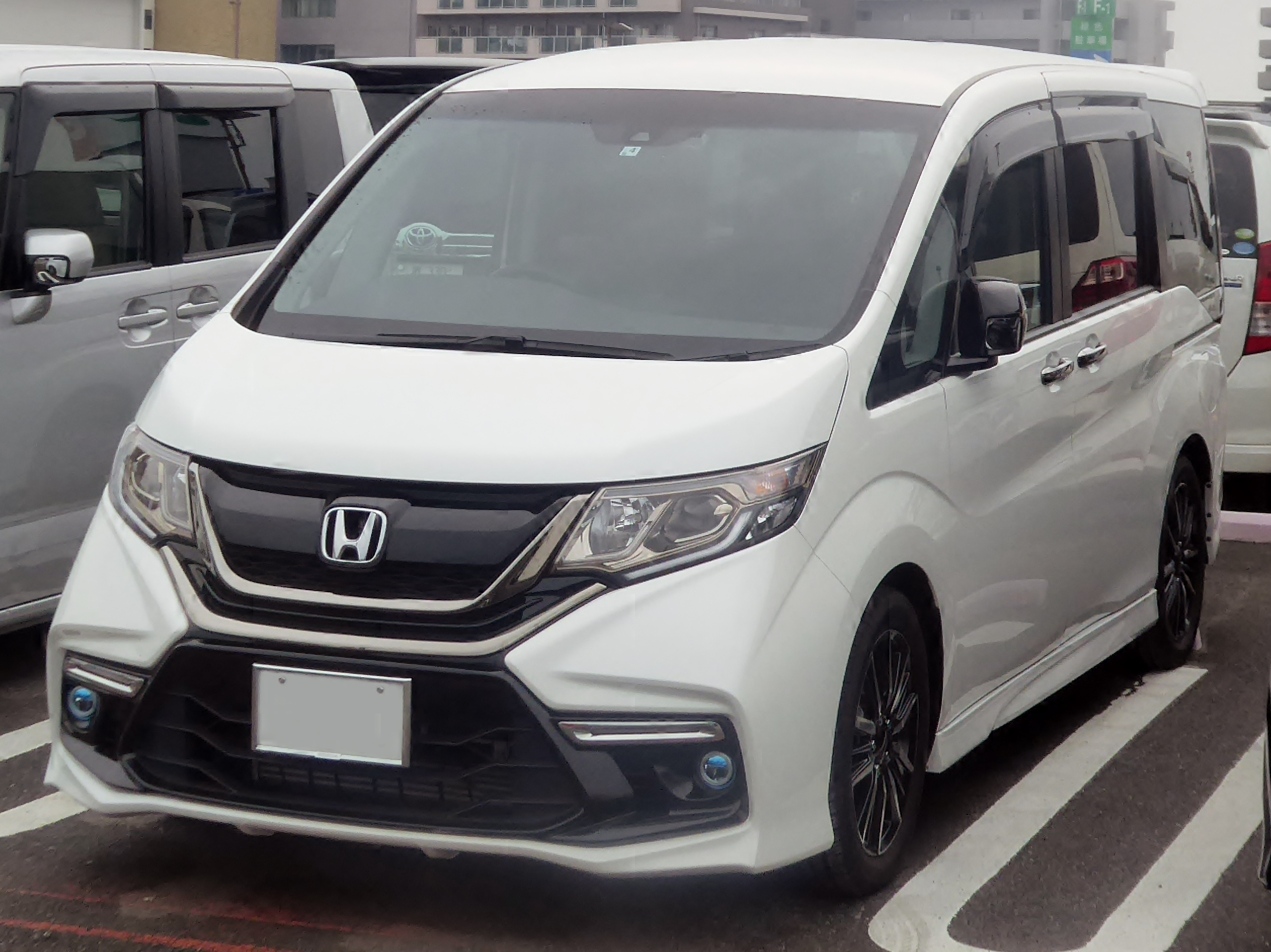
Honda Stepwgn Modulo X (RP3; pre-facelift)

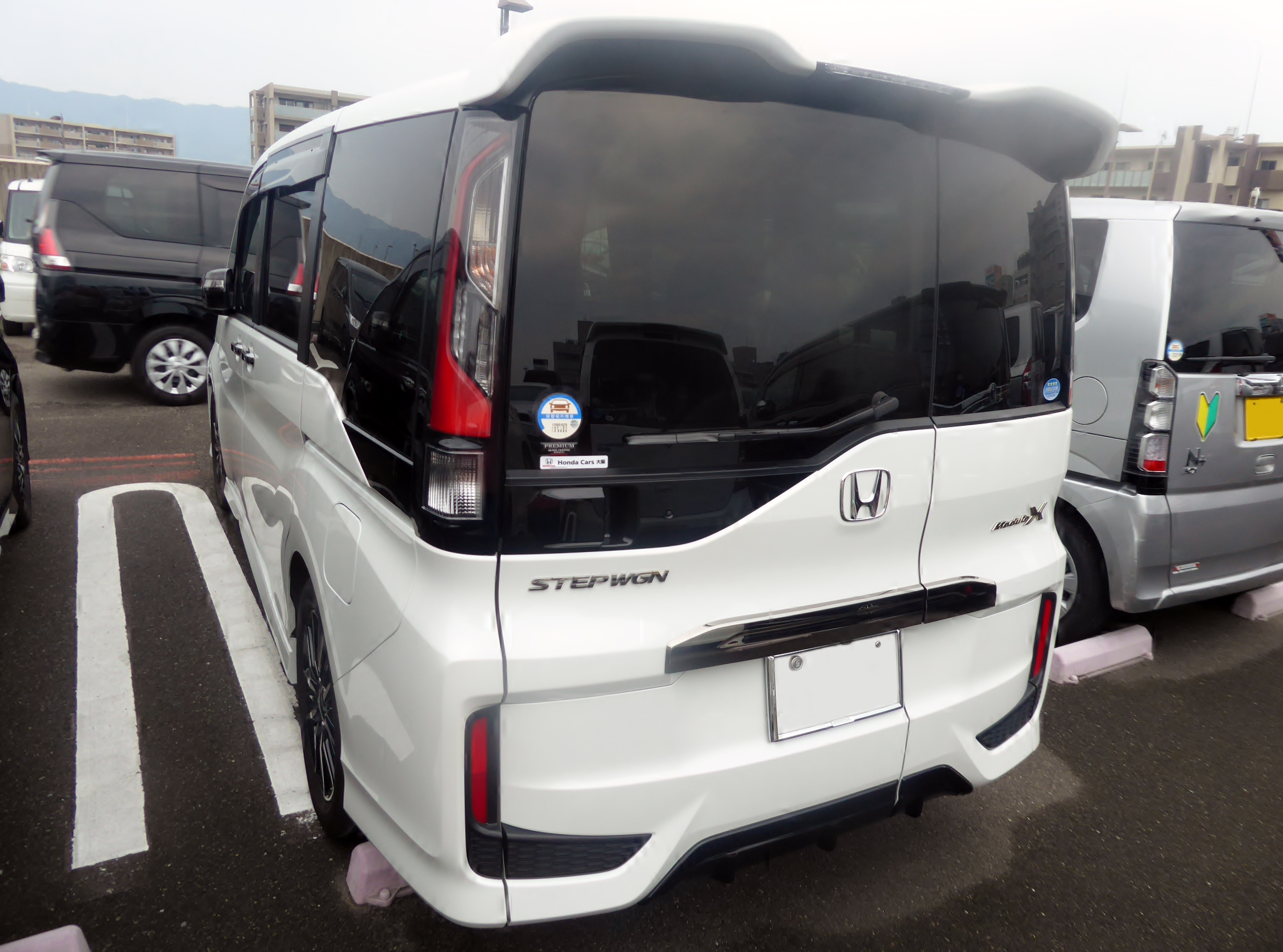
Honda Stepwgn Modulo X (RP3; pre-facelift)

=== 2017 facelift ===
The Stepwgn was refreshed in September 2017. The Stepwgn Spada Hybrid has a 3-mode powertrain which can switch between EV, hybrid, or engine drive modes. It also has a Sport drive mode.

It is equipped with a Honda Sensing system, which assists the driver with parking by controlling steering.

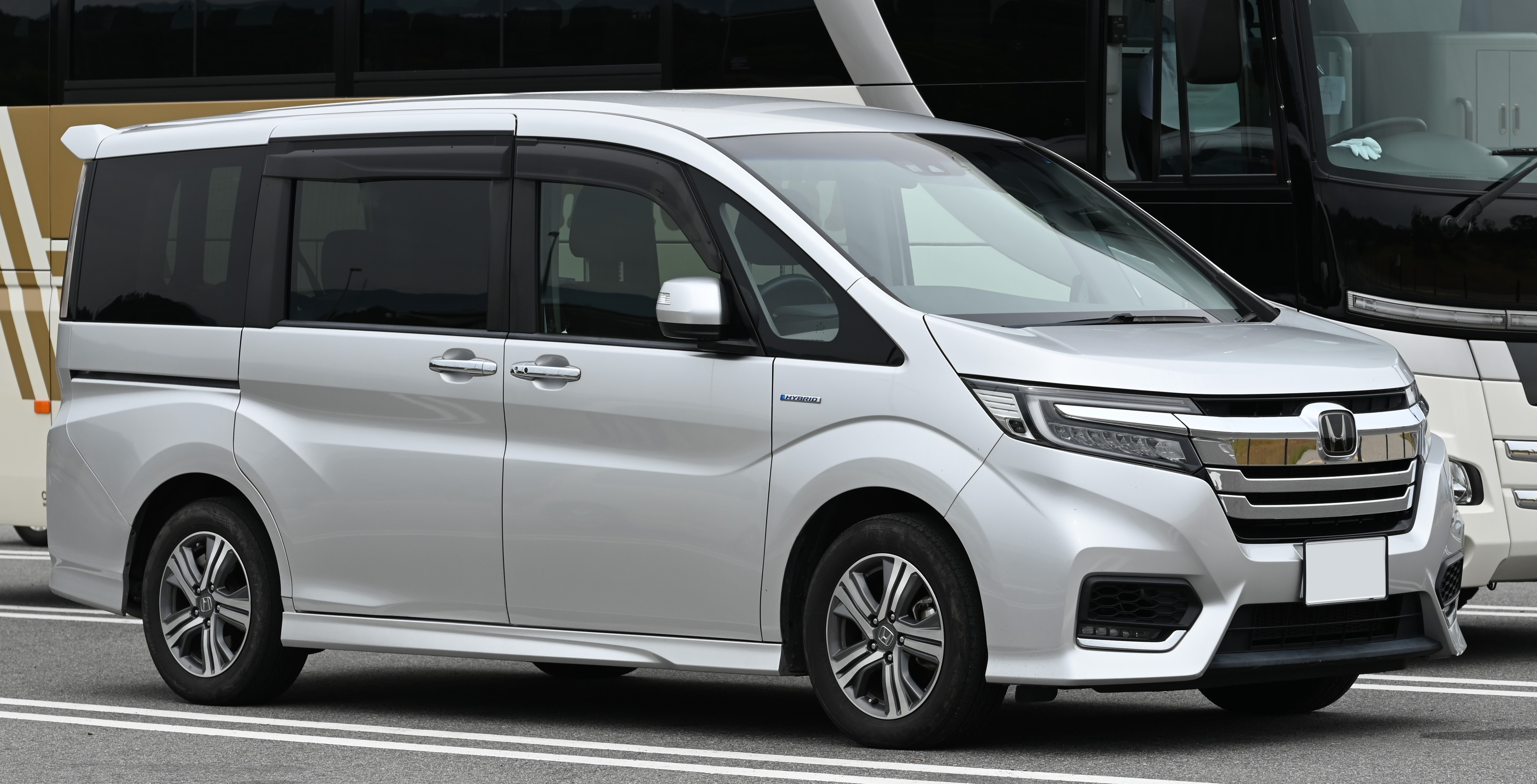
Honda Stepwgn Spada Hybrid G EX Honda Sensing (RP5; facelift)

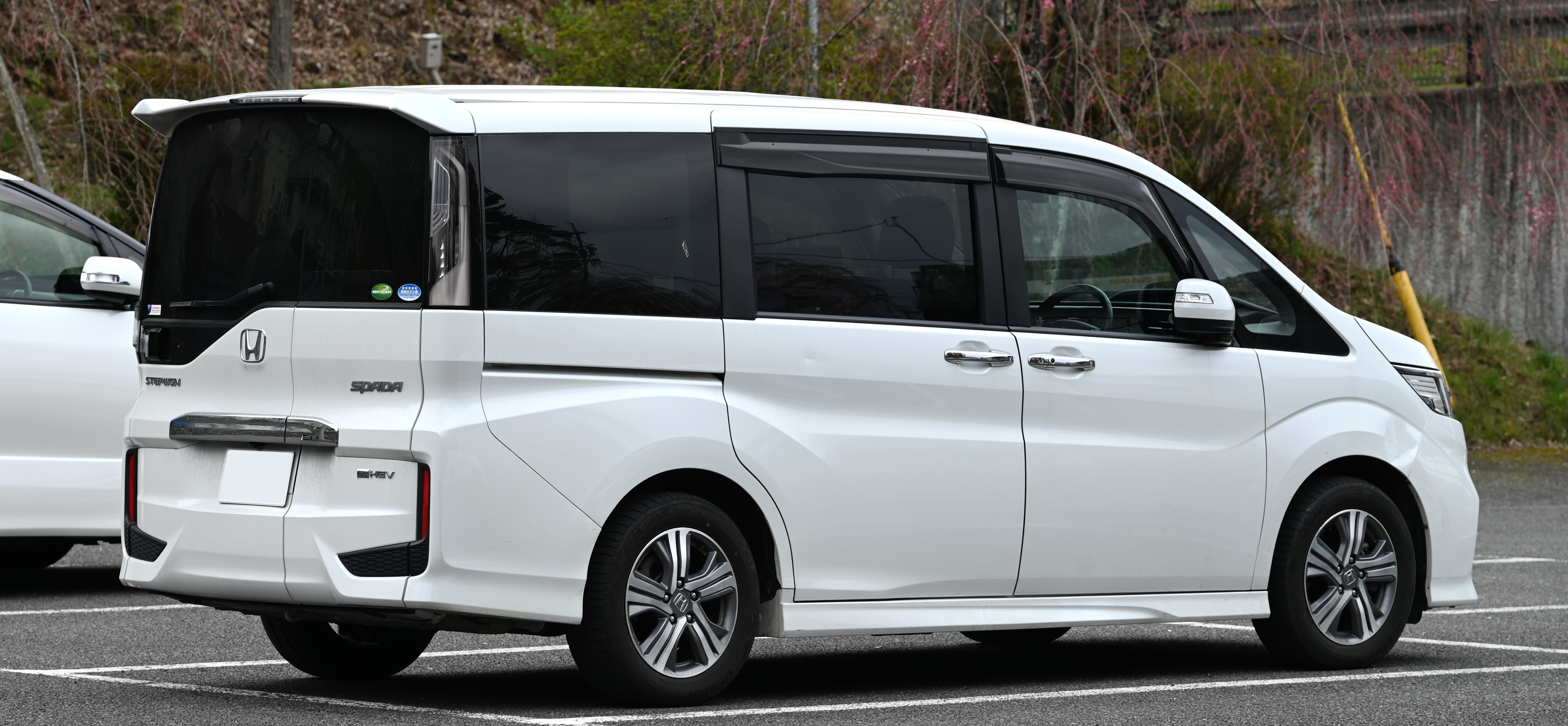
Honda Stepwgn e:HEV Spada G EX Honda Sensing (RP5; facelift)

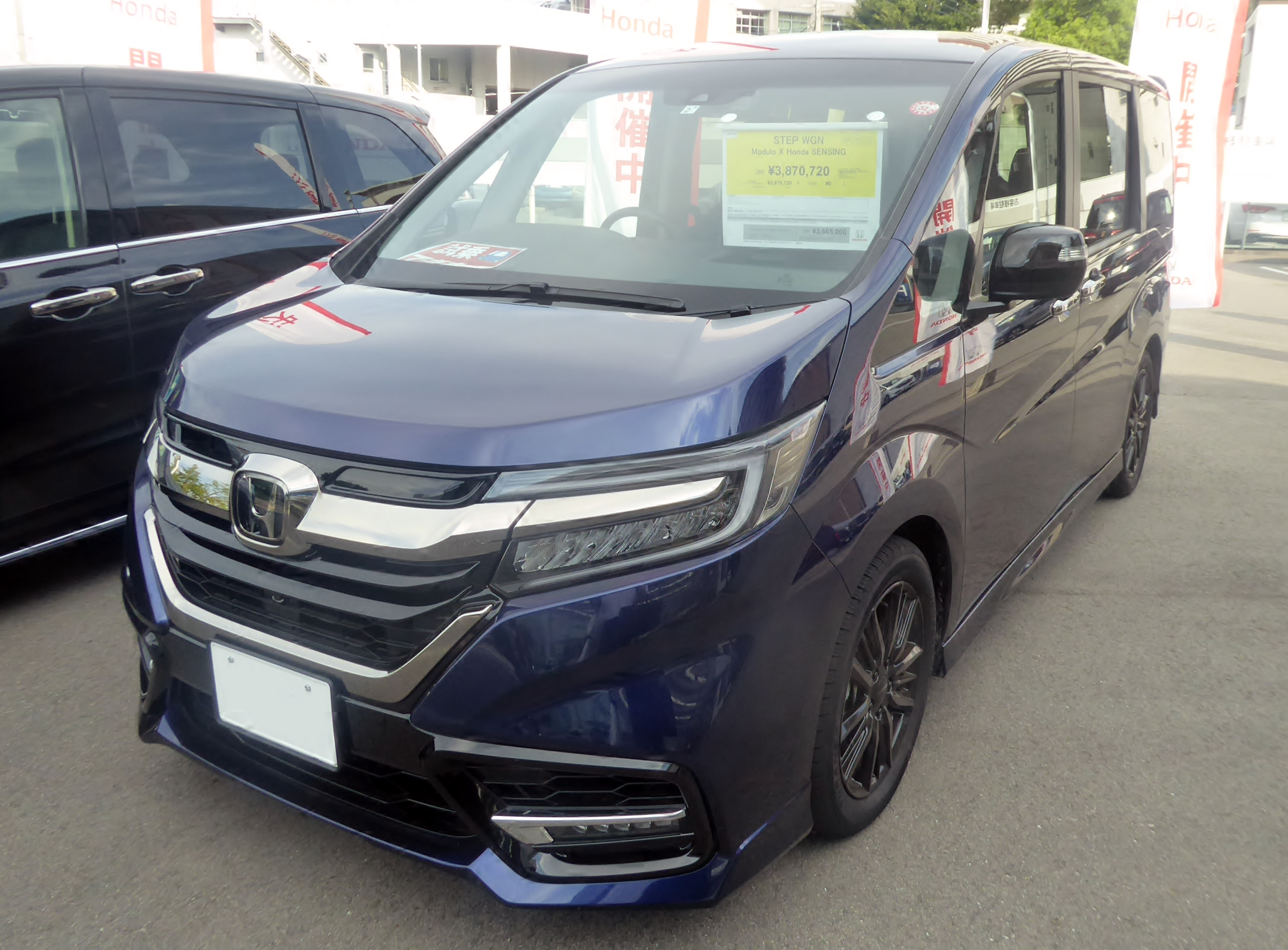
Honda Stepwgn Modulo X Honda Sensing (RP3; facelift)

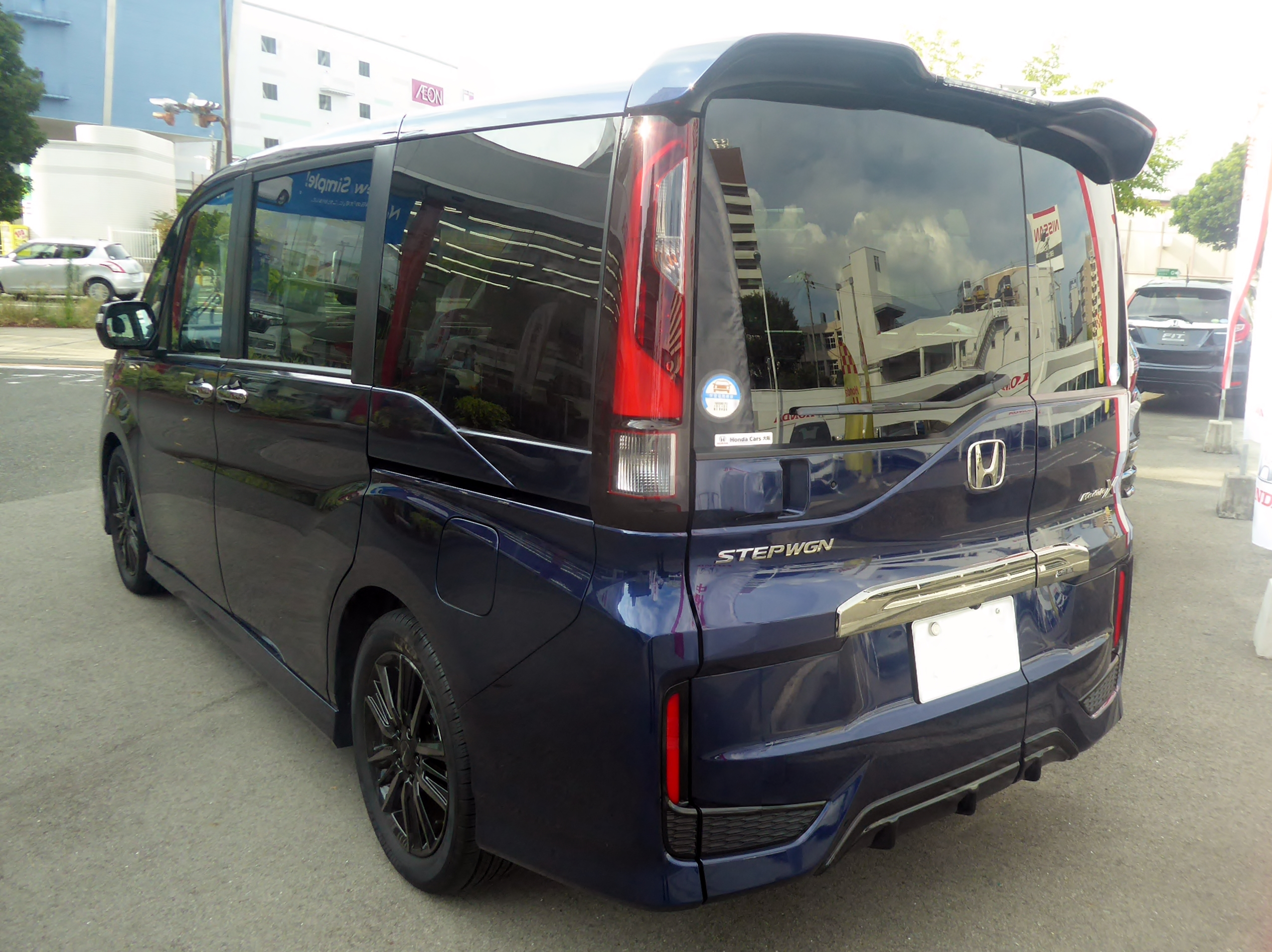
Honda Stepwgn Modulo X Honda Sensing (RP3; facelift)

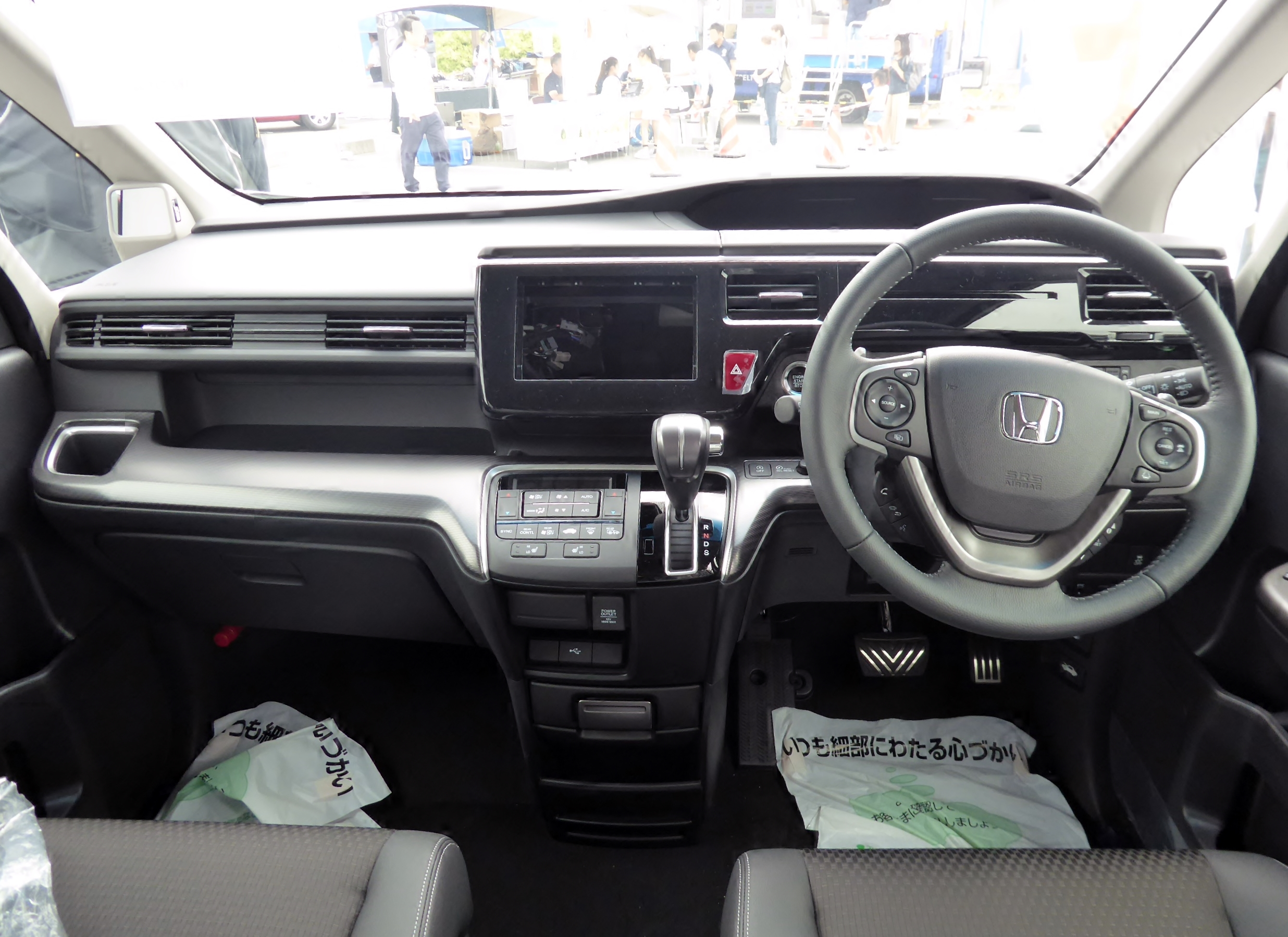
Interior

== Sixth generation (RP6–8; 2022) ==
Sixth generation
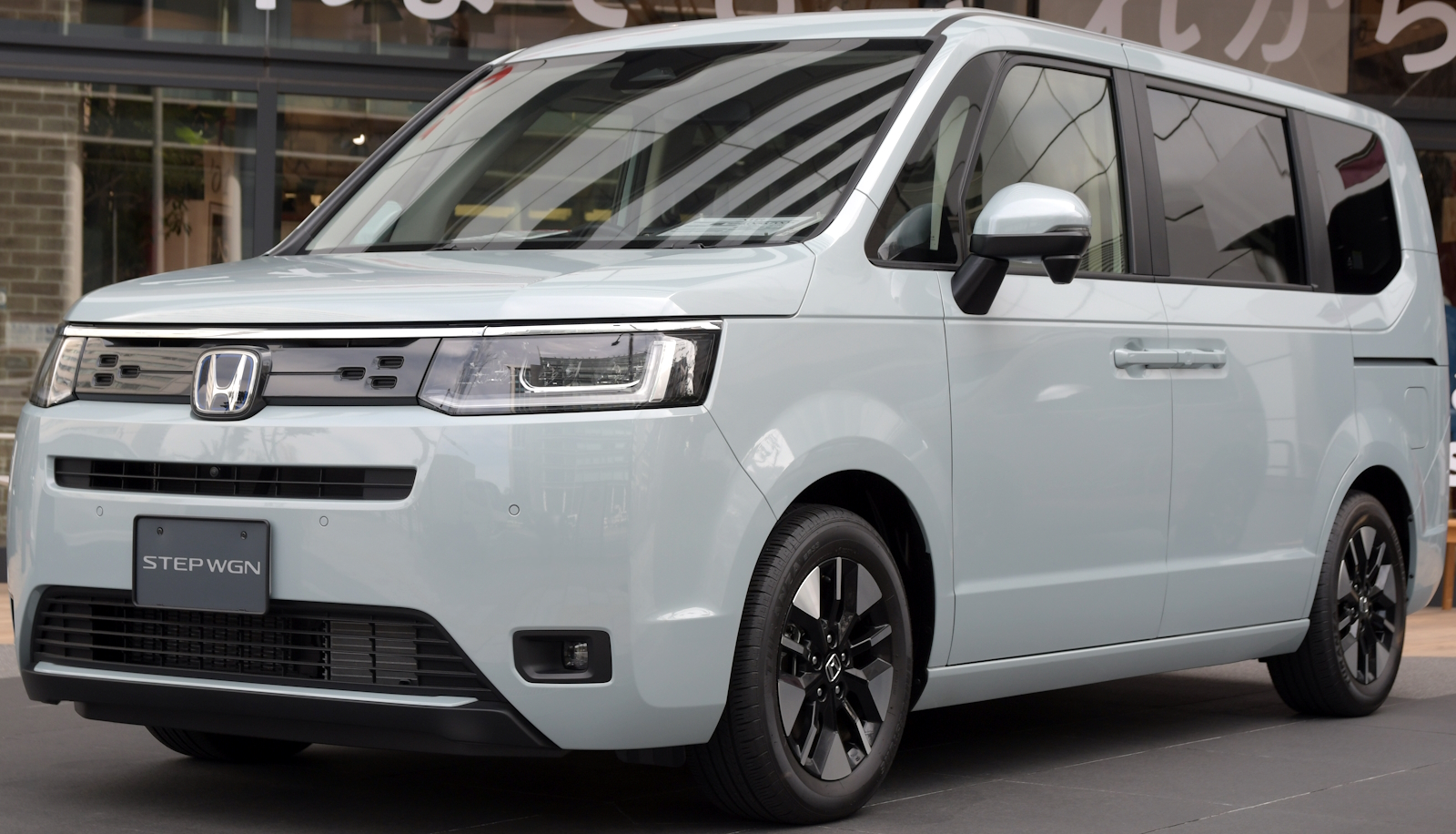
- 2022 Honda Stepwgn Air

Overview
- Model code: RP6–8
- Production: 2022–present

Body and chassis
- Body style: 5-door minivan

Powertrain
- Engine: Petrol: 1.5 L L15C I4 turbo (RP6/7); Petrol hybrid: 2.0 L LFA-H4 I4 (RP8)
- Transmission: CVT

Dimensions
- Wheelbase: 2,890 mm (114 in)
- Length: 4,800–4,830 mm (189–190 in)
- Width: 1,750 mm (69 in)
- Height: 1,840–1,855 mm (72–73 in)
- Curb weight: 1,710–1,860 kg (3,770–4,101 lb)

The sixth-generation Stepwgn was unveiled on 7 January 2022. It is available in three models: Air, Spada, and Spada Premium Line. For this generation, the Waku Waku Gate was dropped in favour of a conventional automatic tailgate. There is also a Stepwgn Air sports mix with a rear spoiler added. Other accessories include different rims and trim changes. The Spada comes with the Emotional Solid with different rims and trim. In the promotion campaign, Honda reused the song Ob-La-Di, Ob-La-Da from the first gen StepWGN advertising, although this time Honda used a cover recorded by Superorganism, rather than the Beatles' original.

=== Export markets ===
==== Brunei ====
The Bruneian market Stepwgn was launched in 26 September 2025 and it is available in the sole e:HEV variant powered by the 2.0-litre e:HEV petrol hybrid.

==== Indonesia ====
The sixth-generation Stepwgn was launched in Indonesia on 23 July 2025 at the 32nd Gaikindo Indonesia International Auto Show, marking the nameplate debut in the country. It is available in the sole e:HEV variant powered by the 2.0-litre e:HEV petrol hybrid.

==== Singapore ====
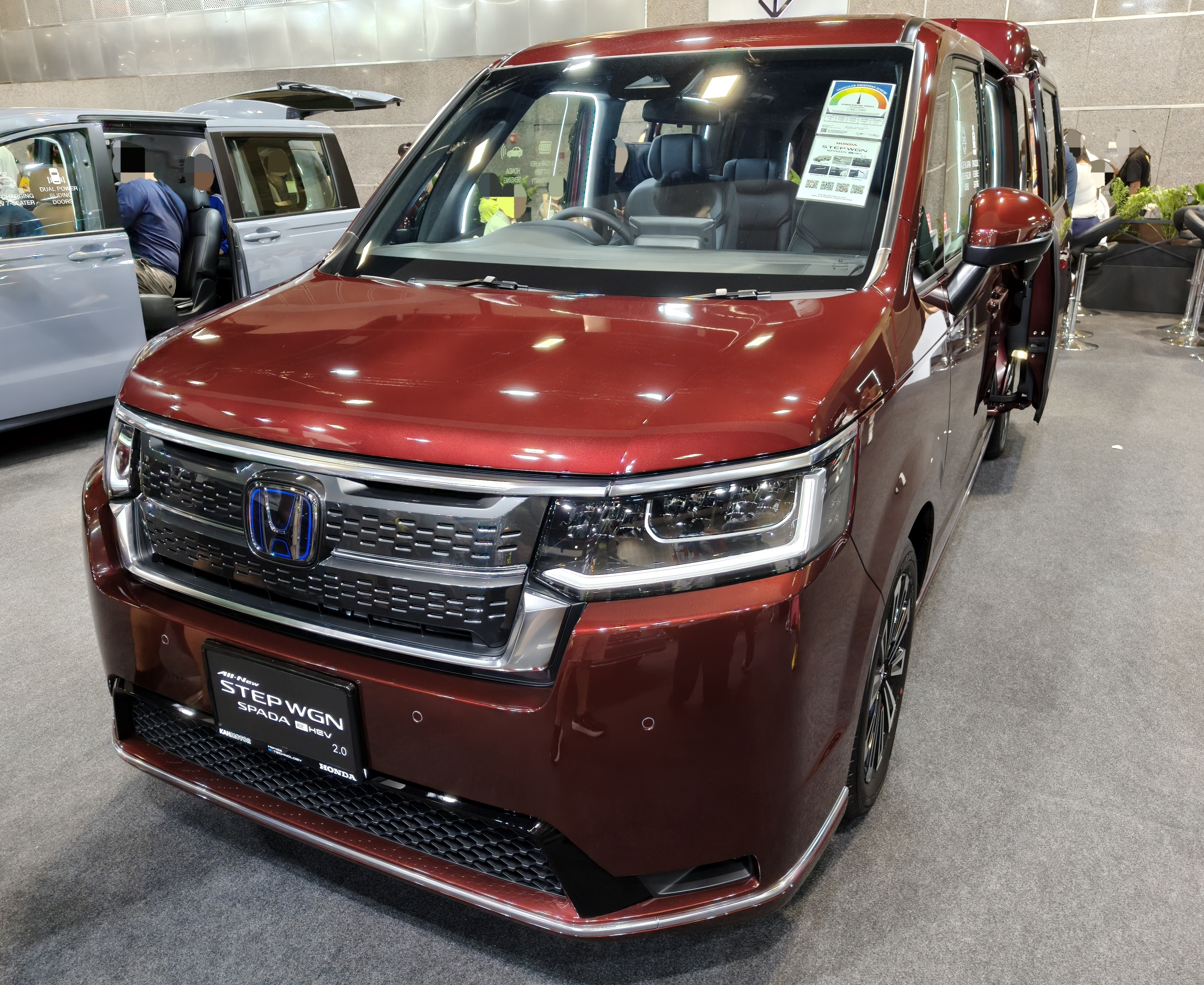
Honda Stepwgn Spada 2.0 eHEV (Singapore)

The sixth-generation Stepwgn was launched in Singapore on 6 November 2025, in the sole Spada variant powered by the 2.0-litre e:HEV petrol hybrid. While only available through parallel import distributors previously, it became also available through the authorised dealer. The 1.5-litre turbo Welcab variants are also available through parallel importers.

==== Thailand ====
The sixth-generation Stepwgn was launched in Thailand on 28 November 2025 at the 42nd Thailand International Motor Expo 2025, it is available in the sole e:HEV Spada variant powered by the 2.0-litre e:HEV petrol hybrid.

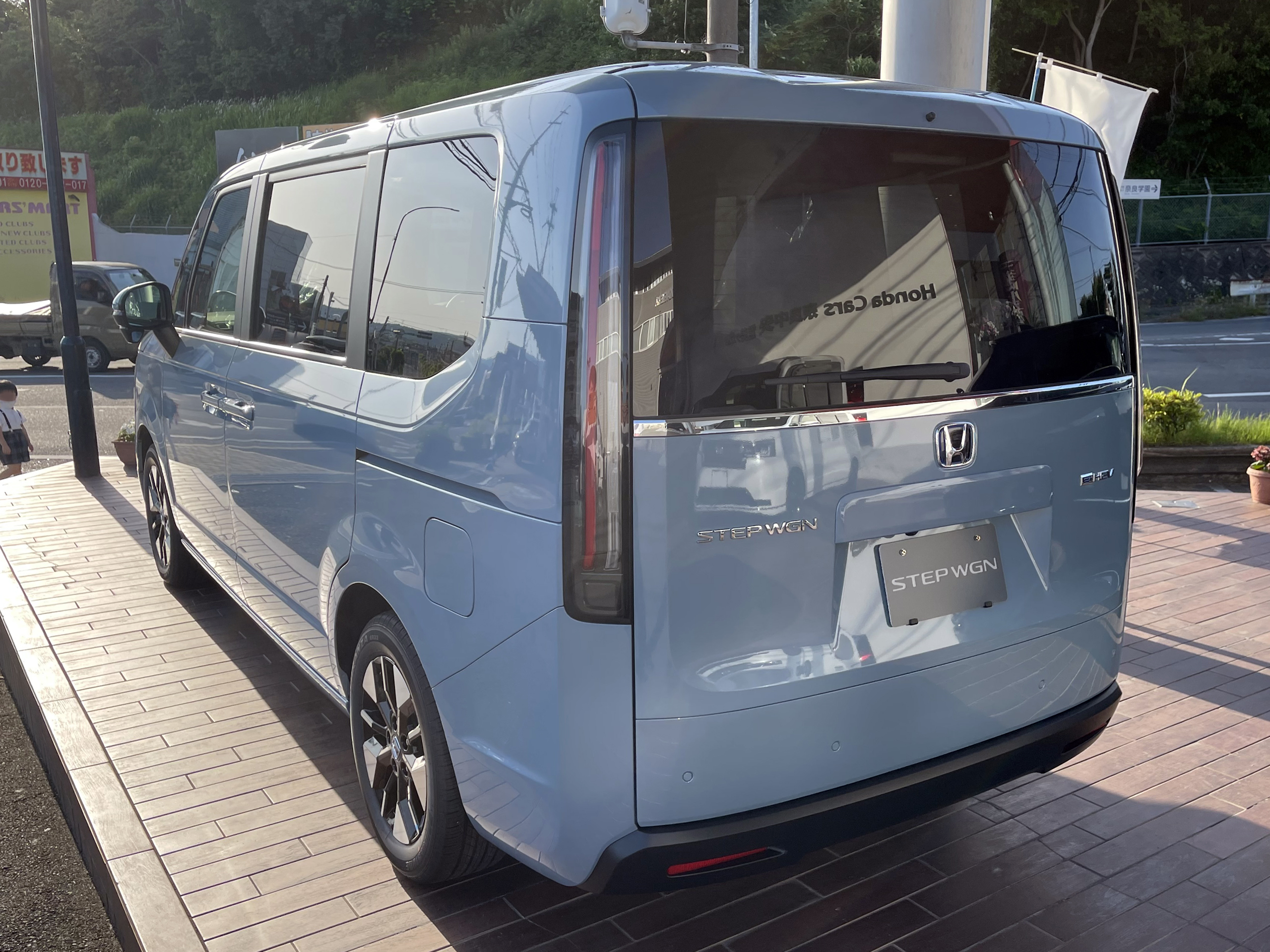
Stepwgn Air e:HEV rear view

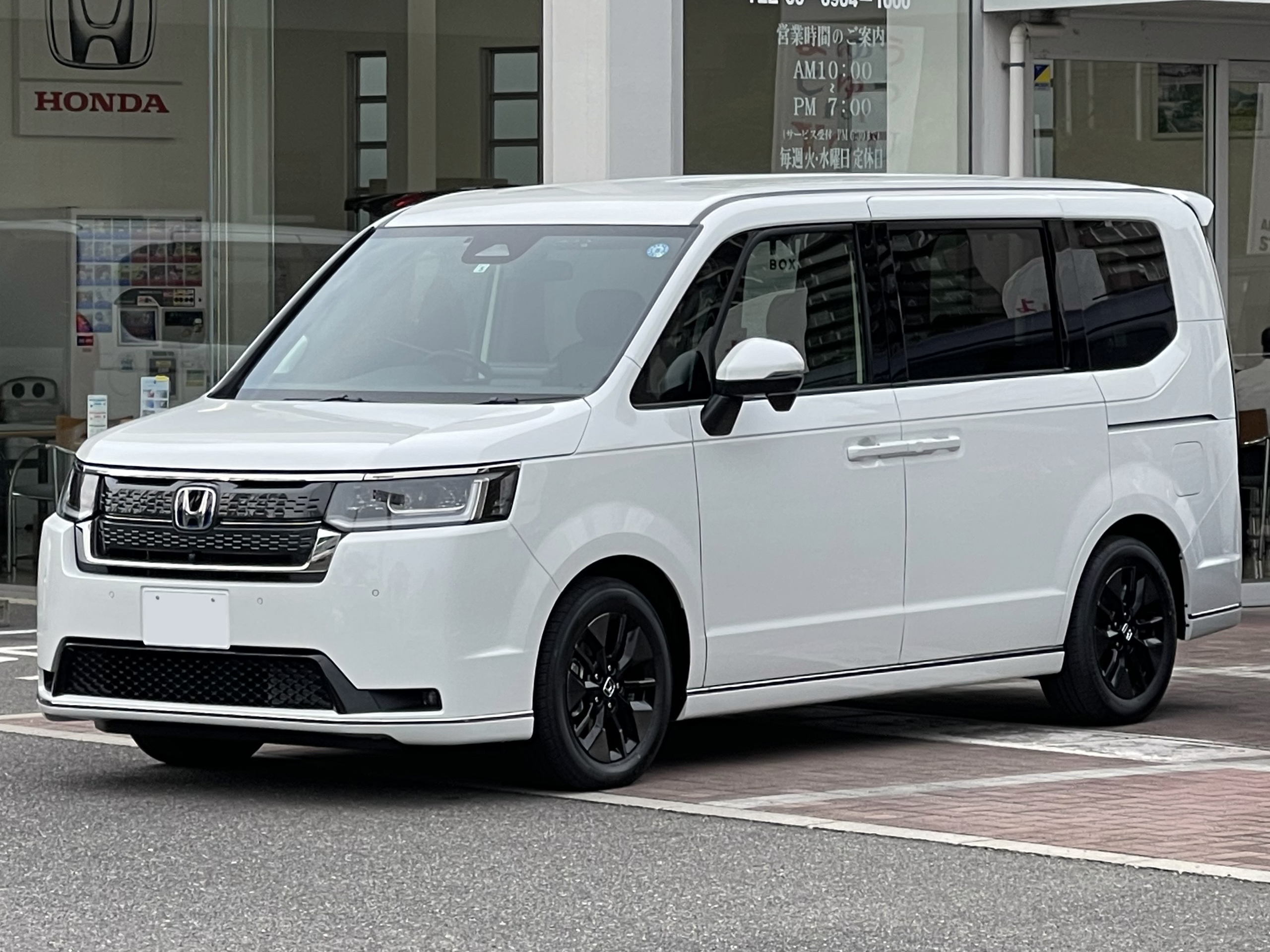
Stepwgn e:HEV Spada

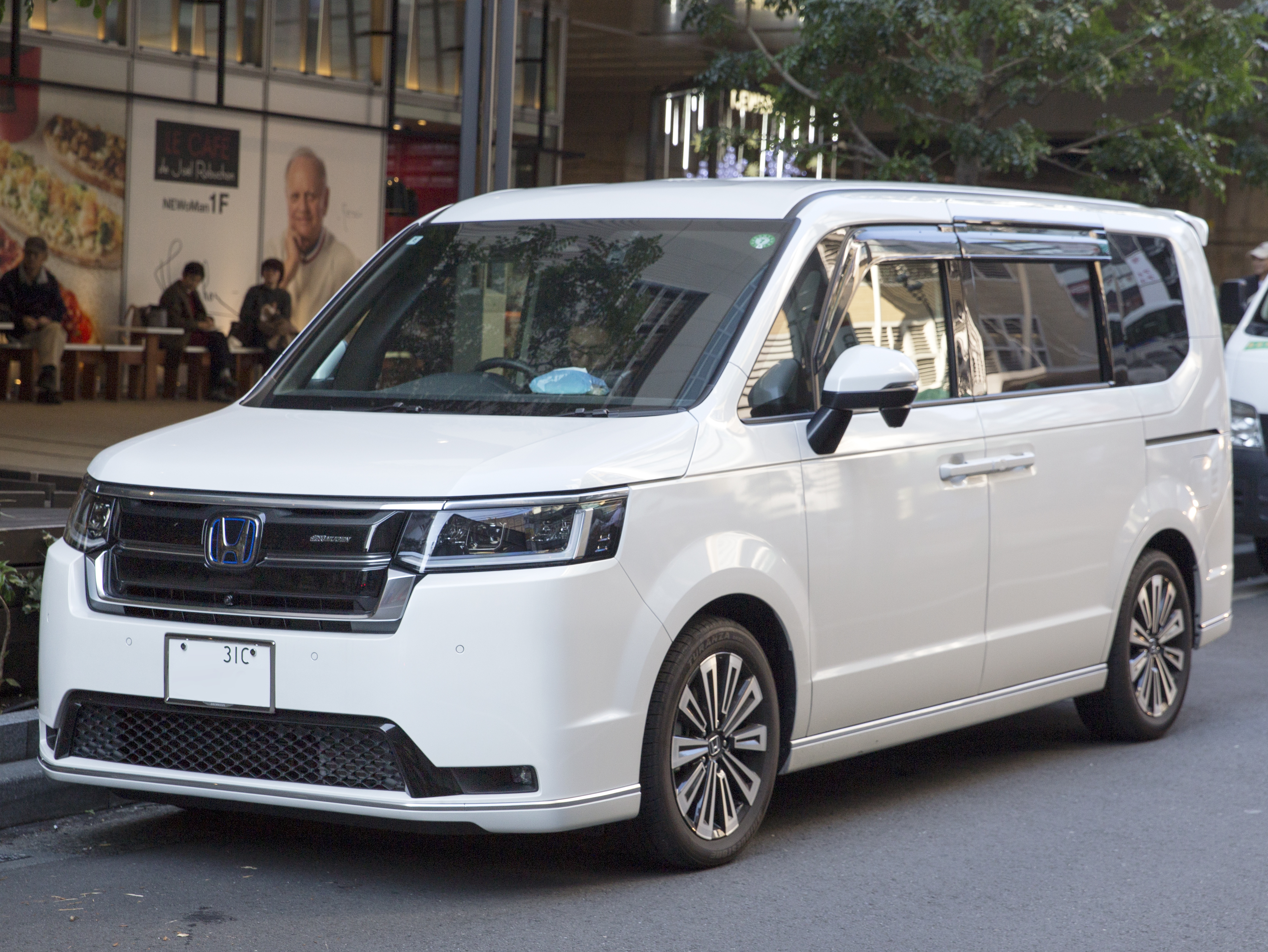
Stepwgn e:HEV Spada Premium Line

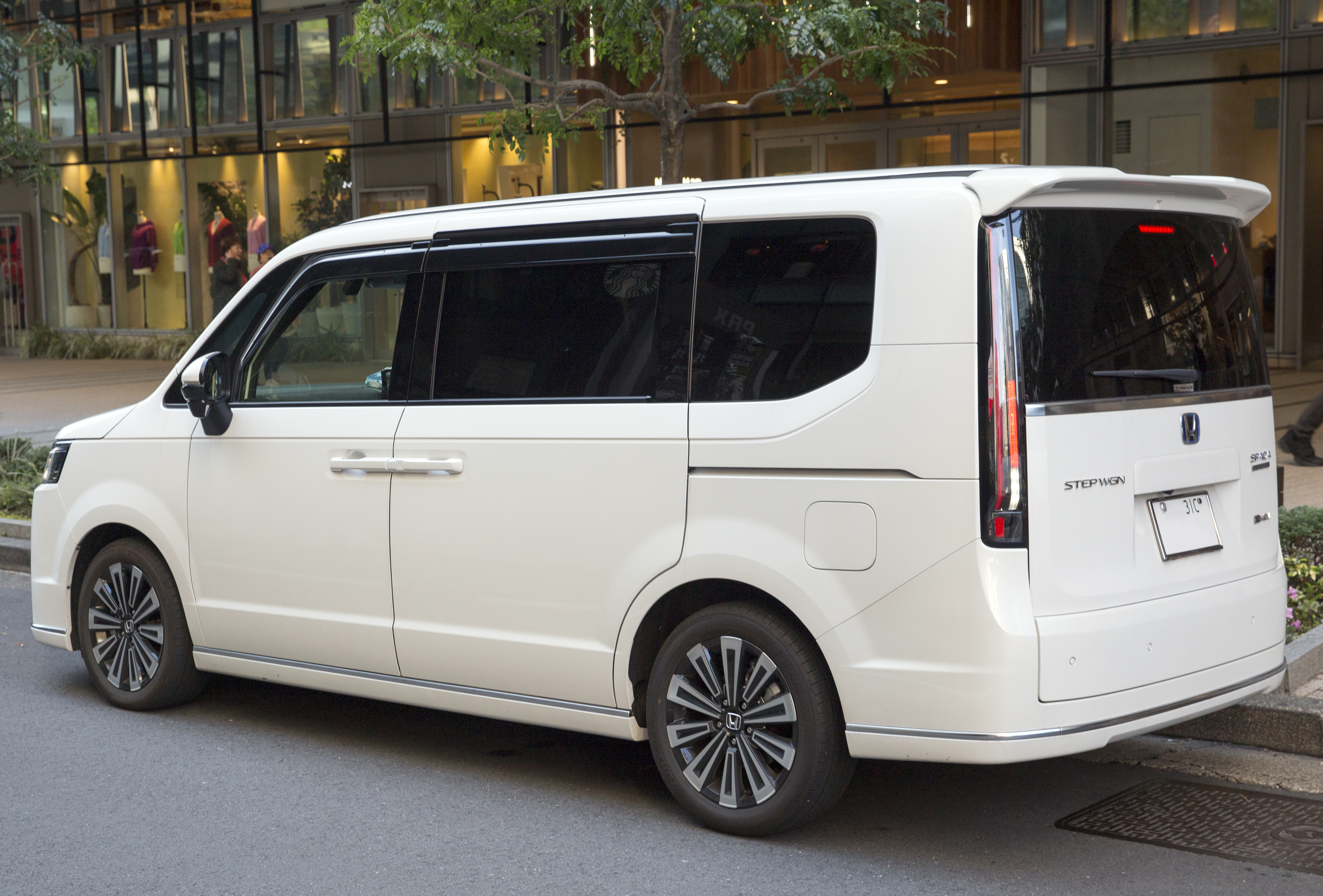
Stepwgn e:HEV Spada Premium Line rear view

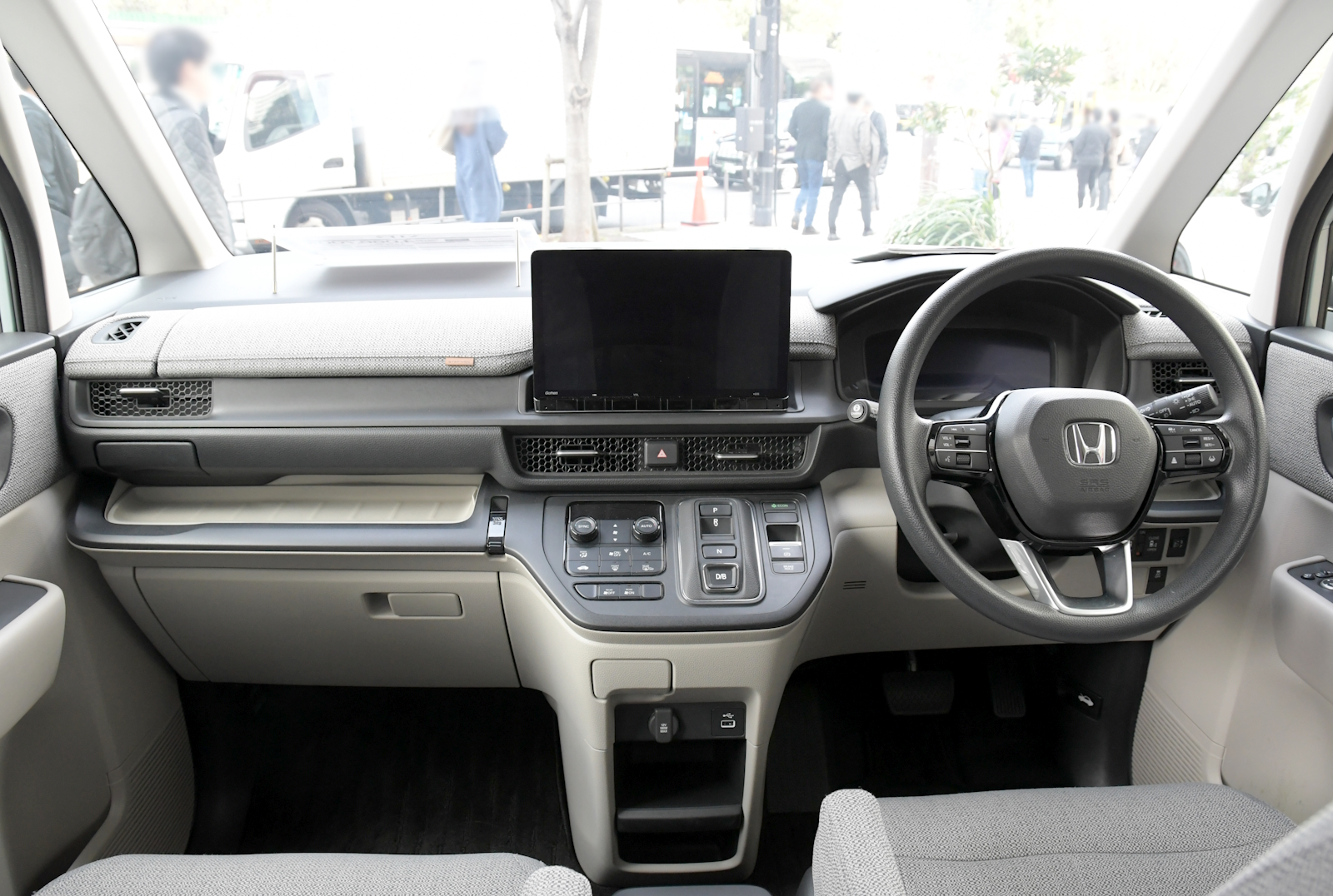
Interior

== Sales ==
Year	Japan	Indonesia
1997	109,893	
1998	93,280	
1999	90,495	
2000	79,270	
2001	110,014	
2002	71,128	
2003	63,182	
2004	46,700	
2005	91,745	
2006	78,216	
2007	55,800	
2008	44,441	
2009	43,020	
2010	80,934	
2011	48,797	
2012	63,707	
2013	62,206	
2014	42,743	
2015	53,699	
2016	52,472	
2017	46,457	
2018	56,872	
2019	52,676	
2020	34,441	
2021	39,247	
2022	37,966	
2023	44,157	
2024	55,147	
2025	57,053	504
