= List of Honda automobiles =

Honda has produced the following cars, SUVs, and light trucks.

== Current models ==
Model	Calendar year introduced	Current model		Main markets	Vehicle description
Model	Calendar year introduced	Introduction	Update (facelift)	Main markets	Vehicle description
Hatchback
Brio	2011	2018	2023	Southeast Asia	Entry-level hatchback, currently only produced in Indonesia for several Southeast Asian markets.
City	1981 (nameplate); 2019 (reintroduced)	2019	2026	Southeast Asia and South America	Hatchback version of the City subcompact car. The newest model replaced the third-generation Fit/Jazz in some emerging markets.
Civic Integra (China)	1972 1985 (Integra nameplate)	2021 2023	2024	Global (except India) China	Hatchback version of the Civic compact car. Also sold as the Honda Integra in China.
Fit/Jazz	2001	2020	2022	Japan, Europe and Taiwan	Practicality-oriented subcompact hatchback/supermini. Hybrid and e:HEV available.
Super-One/Super-N	2026	2026	–	Japan, Southeast Asia and the UK	Battery electric hatchback, widebody version of the N-One.
Sedan
Accord Inspire (China)	1976; 1989 (Inspire nameplate)	2023	—	Global (except Europe, India and Malaysia) China	Mid-size sedan. Also available as the Inspire in China. Hybrid and PHEV available.
Amaze	2013 (as Brio Amaze)	2024	—	India and South Africa	Entry-level sedan engineered for the Indian market.
City	1996 (as a sedan)	2013 2019	2026	Global emerging markets	Subcompact/compact sedan. The latest generation is destined for emerging markets. Hybrid or e:HEV available. Previously sold in South African markets under the name Ballade from 2011 into 2025.
Civic Integra (China)	1972 1985	2021 2021	2024	Global (except India) China	Compact sedan. Oldest continuous nameplate used in a Honda automobile.
MPV/minivan/station wagon
Freed	2008	2024	—	Japan	Two or three-row Mini MPV with sliding doors for the Japanese market. Hybrid available.
Odyssey (international) Elysion (China)	1994 2004 (Elysion nameplate)	2013 2015	2020 2021	Asia China	Three-row minivan with sliding doors. Hybrid available. Previously, the Elysion nameplate was also sold in Japan until 2013.
Odyssey (North America)	1994	2017	2025	North America and Middle East	Three-row minivan with sliding doors engineered for the North American market, exported throughout the Americas and Middle East.
Stepwgn	1996	2022	—	Japan and Southeast Asia	Three-row high-roof compact MPV with sliding doors mainly for the Japanese market. Hybrid also available.
Crossover SUV
Alpha	2026 (planned)		—	India and Japan	Two-row battery electric crossover SUV.
Avancier UR-V	2016 2017	2027 2017	— 2023	Southeast Asia and others China	Two-row mid-size crossover SUV for the Southeast Asia market. The UR-V is only available in China produced by Dongfeng Honda. Previously the Avancier nameplate was used for station wagon.
BR-V	2016	2021	—	Southeast Asia and others	Two-/three-row subcompact crossover SUVs destined for emerging markets.
CR-V Breeze (China)	1995 2019	2022 2022	—	Global (except India) China	Compact crossover SUV. Available as a two-row and three-row in select markets. Hybrid, PHEV and FCEV also available. The Breeze is only available in China produced by Guangqi Honda.
Elevate (India) WR-V (Japan, Singapore and South America)	2023	2023	2026	India, Japan, Singapore, South America and South Africa	Subcompact crossover SUV for the Indian, South American, Singaporean and Japanese market.
e:NS2 (China) e:N2 (Thailand) Insight (Japan)	2024 1999 (Insight nameplate)	2024 2026	—	China, Thailand and Japan	Battery electric crossover SUV produced by Dongfeng Honda respectively. Also sold as the Insight in Japan since March 2026.
e:Ny1 (Europe) e:N1 (Thailand, Hong Kong, Macau, and Indonesia)	2023 2023	2023 2023	—	Europe and Thailand	Battery electric version of the HR-V/Vezel subcompact crossover SUV.
HR-V (global) Vezel (Japan and China) XR-V (China)	1998 2013 (reintroduced) 2014	2021	2025	Global (except North America and India)	Subcompact crossover SUV. Hybrid available.
Passport	1993 (nameplate)	2025	—	North America and Japan	Two-row mid-size crossover SUV, shorter version of the Pilot.
Pilot	2002	2022	2026	North America and Middle East	Three-row mid-size crossover SUV mainly for the North American market.
Prologue	2024	2024	—	North America	Two-row mid-size crossover SUV based on GM BEV3 platform.
P7 S7	2024 2024	2024	—	China	Battery electric mid-size crossover SUV produced by Dongfeng Honda and Guangqi Honda respectively.
WR-V	2016	2022	—	Southeast Asia	Crossover SUV slotted below the HR-V. Smallest SUV model from Honda.
ZR-V (global) HR-V (North America and China)	2022	2022	—	Global (except Southeast Asia)	Compact crossover SUV positioned below the CR-V. Sold in North America and China (by Dongfeng Honda) as the HR-V. Hybrid also available.
Kei vehicles
N-Box	2011	2023	—	Japan	Super tall-height wagon kei car with rear sliding doors. Best-selling car in any category in Japan.
N-One N-One e:	2012 2025	2020 2025	—	Japan	Retro-styled low-roof hatchback kei car with hinged rear doors. Battery electric version of the N-One.
N-Van N-Van e:	2018 2024	2018 2024	—	Japan	Kei commercial microvan with rear sliding doors with the emphasis on rear cargo space. Battery electric version of the N-Van.
N-WGN	2013	2019	2022	Japan	Semi-tall height wagon kei car with hinged rear doors.
Pickup truck
Ridgeline	2004	2016	2020	North America	Unibody/monocoque pickup based on the Pilot and Passport.
Sports/performance car
Civic Type R	1997	2022	2026	Global (except Europe and India)	Performance version of the Civic hatchback.
Prelude	1978	2025 (reintroduced)	—	Global (except India)	Compact sports car coupe.

== Former models ==
Image	Model	Introduced	Discontinued	Reintroduced	Re-discontinued	Notes
	145	1972	1974			
	1300	1969	1973			
	Acty	1977	2021			
	Life Step Van/Pick Up	1972	1974			Commercial vehicle version based on the Honda Life
	Airwave	2005	2010			
	Ascot	1989	1997			
	Avancier (station wagon)	1999	2004			
	Ballade	1980	1986	2011	2025	Version of Honda City sedan in South Africa
	Beat	1991	1996			
	Capa	1998	2002			
	City/Jazz	1981	1994			a.k.a. Jazz in Europe in first-generation City (AA)
	Clarity	2008	2014	2016	2021	Formerly Honda FCX Clarity in 2007 through 2014
	CR-X	1983	1991			a.k.a. Ballade Sports CR-X or Civic CR-X
	CR-X del Sol	1992	1997			a.k.a. Civic del Sol/del Sol for North American market
	CR-Z	2011	2016			
	Crider	2013	2025			
	Crossroad	1993	1998	2007	2010	
	Crosstour	2010	2015			
	Concerto	1988	1992			
	Domani	1992	2004			
	e	2019	2024			an electric vehicle
	e:NP1	2022	2025			Electric version of Third generation HR-V for China
	e:NP2	2024	2026			Version of e:N2 for China
	e:NS1	2022	2025			Electric version of Third generation HR-V for China
	Element	2002	2011			
	Envix	2018	2025			Version of Second generation Crider for China
	EV Plus	1997	1999			an electric vehicle
	FCX	2002	2005			A fuel cell vehicle. Only sold via rental system
	FR-V/Edix	2004	2009			
	Gienia	2015	2019			Version of Sixth generation City for China
	Grace	2014	2020			Version of Sixth generation City for Japan
	Greiz	2015	2019			Version of Sixth generation City Liftback for China
	Horizon	1994	1999			Rebadged Isuzu Trooper
	Jade	2013	2020			
	L700	1965	1966			
	L800	1966	1967			
	LaGreat	1999	2004			Version of North American Odyssey for Japan
	Legend	1985	2021			
	Life Dunk	2000	2004			
	Life	1971	1974	1997 2020	2014 (for 1997 relaunch) 2025 (for 2020 relaunch)	Version of Fourth generation Fit for Chinese-market (2020 relaunch)
	Logo	1996	2001			
	Mobilio	2001	2008	2014	2024 (for 2014 relaunch)	
	Mobilio Spike	2002	2008			
	N360	1967	1970			
	N600	1969	1972			
	NSX	1990	2005	2016	2022	aka Acura NSX
	Orthia	1996	2002			
	Partner	1996	2010			Commercial van version of Honda Orthia (1996–2006) and Honda Airwave (2006–2010)
	P700	1965	1966			Pick-up truck version of the L700
	P800	1966	1967			Pick-up truck version of the L800
	Quint	1980	1985			A.K.A Honda/Rover Quintet
	Rafaga	1993	1997			
	S500	1963	1964			
	S660	2015	2022			
	S600	1964	1966			
	S800	1966	1970			
	S2000	1999	2009			
	Shuttle	2011	2022			A.K.A. Honda Fit Shuttle in first generation
	S-MX	1996	2002			
	Spirior	2009	2018			
	Stream	2000	2014			
	Street	1981	2001			Passenger van version of Honda Acty
	T360/T500	1963	1967			
	That's	2002	2007			
	Today	1985	1997			
	Torneo	1997	2002			
	Tourmaster	1996	1998			Rebadged Isuzu Faster
	Vamos/Vamos Hobio	1970	1973	1999	2018	
	Z	1970	1974	1998	2002	
	Zest	2006	2012			

== Jointly developed cars ==
- During the late 1980s and early 1990s, Honda collaborated with Rover in the development and marketing of the Honda Concerto, Rover 200, 400, 600 and 800. The 800 was called the Sterling in the US.
- Honda partnered with Isuzu in the 1990s to produce the Passport and the Acura SLX.

== Concept vehicles ==
Image	Name	Year	Notes
	Honda 0 Saloon	2024	production was cancelled
	Honda 0 Space-Hub	2024	
	Honda 0 SUV	2025	production was cancelled
	Honda 0 α	2025	
	Honda 3R-C	2010	
	Honda AC-X	2011	
	Honda Argento Vivo	1995	
	Honda ASM	2003	entered production as the first generation Elysion
	Honda Civic Type R	2014	entered production in 2015
	Honda Concept B	2014	entered production as the Gienia
	Honda Concept C	2012	entered production as the first generation Crider
	Honda Concept D	2015	entered production in 2016 as the UR-V
	Honda Concept M	2013	entered production as the fifth generation Odyssey
	Honda Concept S	2012	entered production as the Jade
	Honda CR-V	2011	entered production in 2011 as the fourth generation
	Honda CR-Z	2007; 2009	entered production in 2010
	Honda Dualnote	2001	also shown as the Acura DN-X
	Honda EP-X	1991	
	Honda e:N Coupe	2021	
	Honda e:N GT	2023	
	Honda e:N SUV	2023	entered production in 2025 as the P7/S7
	Honda EV-N Concept	2009	inspired by the N360
	Honda EVX	1993	
	Honda EV-STER	2011	entered production in 2015 as the S660
	Honda FC Sport	2008	
	Honda FCEV	2013	
	Honda FCV	2014	
	Honda FCX	1999	
	Honda FCX	2005	entered production as the FCX Clarity
	Honda FSR	1993	
	Honda FS-X	1991	
	Honda Fuya-Jo	1999	
	Honda Gear	2013	
	Honda GRX	2006	
	Honda Hondina	1970	based on the N360
	Honda HP-X	1984	
	Honda HSC	2003	also shown as the Acura HSC
	Honda HSV		
	Honda IMAS	2003	
	Honda J-MJ	1997	
	Honda J-MW	1997	entered production as the Capa
	Honda J-VX	1997	entered production as the first generation Insight
	Honda J-WJ	1997	entered production as the HR-V
	Honda Kiwami	2003	
	Honda Micro Commuter	2011	
	Honda Model X	2001	entered production as the Element
	Honda MV-99	1998	entered production as the second generation Odyssey
	Honda N7X	2021	entered production as the second generation BR-V
	Honda N800	1965	
	Honda Neukom	1999	
	Honda NeuV	2017	
	Honda New Small Concept	2009	entered production as the first-generation Brio
	Honda NSX Concept	2012	entered production in 2015
	Honda OSM	2008	
	Honda P-NUT Concept	2009	
	Honda Project 2&4	2015	
	Honda Puyo	2007	
	Honda Prelude	2023	entered production in 2025 as the sixth generation
	Honda Remix	2006	
	Honda Skydeck Concept	2009	
	Honda SSM	1995	entered production as the S2000
	Honda S360	1962	
	N Concept 4	2011	entered production as the N-One
	Honda S660	2013	entered production in 2015
	Honda Small Hybrid Sports	2007	
	Honda Spirior	2014	entered production in 2015
	Honda Sports 4	2005	
	Honda Sports EV	2017	
	Honda Sprocket	1999	
	Honda Step Bus	2006	
	Honda Suataina-C	2023	
	Honda SUV RS	2021	entered production as the second generation WR-V
	Honda Super EV	2025	entered production as the Super-One
	Honda SUT	2004	entered production as the first generation Ridgeline
	Honda U3-X	2009	scooter
	Honda UNI-CUB β	2013	scooter
	Honda Unibox	2001	
	Honda Urban EV	2017	entered production as the e
	Honda Urban SUV Concept	2013	entered production as the second generation HRV/Vezel
	Honda MC-β	2013	
	Honda Vision XS-1	2014	
	Honda w•i•c	2001	entered production as the That's
	Honda WOW	2005	
	Honda Ye GT	2024	

== Racing vehicles ==
- 1964 RA271
- 1965 RA272
- 1966 RA273
- 1967 RA300
- 1968 RA301
- 1968 RA302
- 1969 R-1300
- 1991 RC100
- 1992 RC101
- 1994 NSX GT2
- 1995 NSX GT1 Turbo
- 1995–1998 Accord (Super Touring)
- 1996 RC101B
- 1999–2000 Accord (Super Touring)
- 1999 RA099
- 1997–2009 NSX-GT
- 2002 Civic Type R (S2000)
- 2002 Civic Type R (BTC-T)
- 2004 Accord Euro R (S2000)
- 2005 Integra Type R (BTC-T)
- 2006 RA106
- 2007 RA107
- 2007 Acura ARX-01
- 2007 Civic Type R FN2 R3
- 2008 RA108
- 2009 Acura ARX-02a
- 2010–2013 HSV-010 GT
- 2012 HPD ARX-03
- 2012–2013 Civic WTCC (S2000)
- 2014–2016 NSX Concept-GT
- 2014 HPD ARX-04b
- 2014–2017 Civic WTCC (TC1)
- 2015 Civic Type R TCR (FK2)
- 2017–present NSX-GT
- 2017 NSX GT3
- 2018 Acura ARX-05
- 2018 Civic Type R TCR (FK8)
- 2023 Honda CR-V Hybrid Racer
- 2023 Acura ARX-06

=== Honda-powered racing vehicles ===
- 1983 Spirit-Honda 201
- 1983 Spirit-Honda 201C
- 1983 Williams-Honda FW09
- 1984 Williams-Honda FW09B
- 1985 Williams-Honda FW10
- 1986 Williams-Honda FW11
- 1987 Williams-Honda FW11B
- 1987 Lotus-Honda 99T
- 1988 McLaren-Honda MP4/4
- 1988 Lotus-Honda 100T
- 1989 McLaren-Honda MP4/5
- 1990 McLaren-Honda MP4/5B
- 1991 McLaren-Honda MP4/6
- 1991 Tyrrell-Honda 020
- 1992 McLaren-Honda MP4/6B
- 1992 McLaren-Honda MP4/7A
- 2000 BAR-Honda 002
- 2001 Jordan-Honda EJ11
- 2001 BAR-Honda 003
- 2002 Jordan-Honda EJ12
- 2002 BAR-Honda 004
- 2003 BAR-Honda 005
- 2004 BAR-Honda 006
- 2005 BAR-Honda 007
- 2006 Super Aguri-Honda SA05
- 2006 Super Aguri-Honda SA06
- 2007 Super Aguri-Honda SA07
- 2008 Super Aguri-Honda SA08
- 2015 McLaren-Honda MP4-30
- 2016 McLaren-Honda MP4-31
- 2017 McLaren-Honda MCL32
- 2018 Toro Rosso-Honda STR13
- 2019 Red Bull-Honda RB15
- 2019 Toro Rosso-Honda STR14
- 2020 Red Bull-Honda RB16
- 2020 AlphaTauri-Honda AT01
- 2021 Red Bull-Honda RB16B
- 2021 AlphaTauri-Honda AT02
- 2023 Red Bull-Honda RBPT RB19
- 2023 AlphaTauri-Honda RBPT AT04
- 2024 Red Bull-Honda RBPT RB20
- 2024 RB-Honda RBPT VCARB 01
- 2025 Red Bull-Honda RBPT RB21
- 2025 Racing Bulls-Honda RBPT VCARB 02

== Former commercial light trucks ==
- Acty (1977–2021)
- T360 (1963–1967)
- T500 (1964–1967)
- TN360/TN-III (1967–1977)

== See also ==
- List of Acura vehicles
- List of Honda engines
- List of Honda motorcycles
- VTEC
