= Skid block =

Racing car attachment

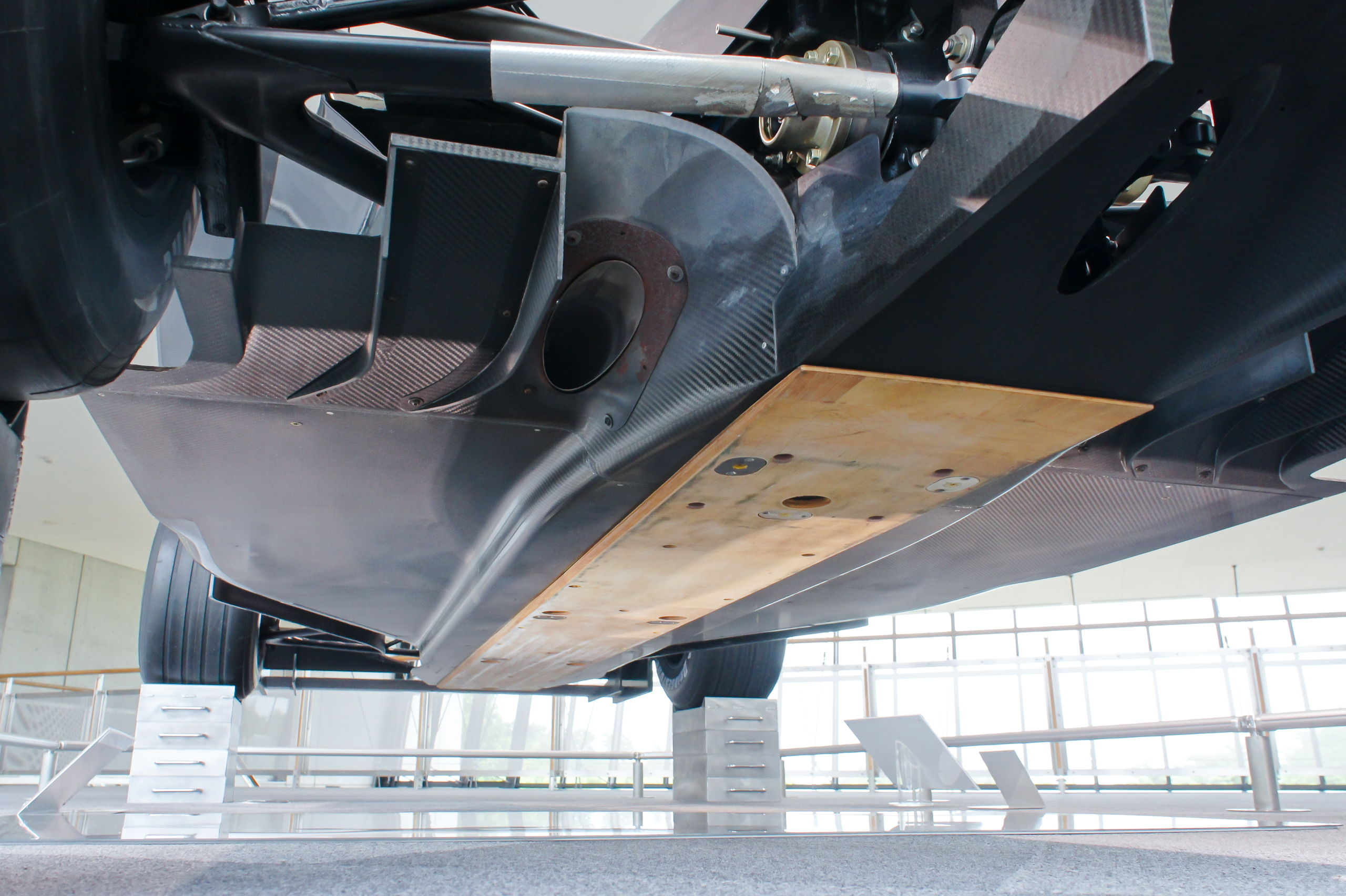
Skid block of the Honda RC-F1 2.0X test car.

A skid block, also known as a plank, is a common term for a mandatory attachment to the underside of a racing car. Initially applied to Formula One cars in 1994, it has also been used in other categories including Formula 3000 and Formula 3. It is a flat rectangle, usually made of fiberglass or a wood composite, designed to impose a minimum ground clearance and to regulate the use of ground effects to enhance handling.

== Specification ==
According to Formula One regulations, a rectangular skid block must be fitted beneath the central plane of the car. This skid block may comprise up to three pieces but must:

1. extend longitudinally from a point lying 330 mm behind the front wheel centre line to the centre line of the rear wheels,
2. be made from a homogeneous material,
3. have a width of 300 mm with a tolerance of ±2 mm,
4. have a thickness of 10 mm with a tolerance of ±0.2 mm,
5. have a uniform thickness when new,
6. be fixed symmetrically about the centre line of the car in such a way that no air may pass between it and the surface formed by the parts lying on the reference plane.

== Typical construction ==
The skid block was introduced in F1 as part of the safety changes that followed Ayrton Senna's death. It has been made of a light, strong and non-flammable fiberglass called permaglass since the late 1990s.

The block used to be made of a material called Jabroc. Jabroc is made of beechwood and built in a composite process. Veneers are layered, and a high-strength resin is used in each layer. It is pressurized, pressed, and brought to a certain and very consistent material density. As a result, each Jabroc skid plank is nearly identical in terms of wear rate and material density. This material is still used in other motorsports.

The plank does not in itself restrict airflow under the car. It is used as a gauge which restricts the minimum ride height attainable by the car. The closer the car is to the ground, the more efficient the front wing and rear diffuser. The higher the down-force levels, the faster a driver may corner. Cornering loads can push the car down much lower to the road, which can be dangerous, and so the skid block was introduced to counteract this. The thickness of the plank is one of the parc fermé tests. If it is found to be worn beyond the allowed limit, the car is disqualified.

== Violations ==
Michael Schumacher in a Benetton was disqualified for an excessively worn plank in the 1994 Belgian Grand Prix. Schumacher spun out across the curb at Pouhon corner. Although the curb carved a pattern into the plank, it was deemed by the FIA to have not been the cause for the excessive wear.

Jarno Trulli in a Jordan was initially disqualified for plank wear after the 2001 United States Grand Prix but the Jordan team successfully appealed the decision to the FIA International Court of Appeal because a steward was absent when the original decision was made, and Trulli's 4th-place finish was allowed to stand.

André Lotterer, Benoît Tréluyer and Marcel Fässler, driving the #7 Audi Sport Team Joest R18 e-tron, were excluded from the 2016 6 Hours of Silverstone after finishing in first place. Post-race scrutineering determined that the skid block was less than the 20 mm dictated by FIA World Endurance Championship rules. The ruling was a blow to Audi's hopes in the first round of the WEC season, handing victory to the defending champion Porsche team. The team chose not to appeal.

Lewis Hamilton and Charles Leclerc were disqualified for excessive plank wear in the 2023 United States Grand Prix after being randomly selected for a post-race inspection. Hamilton had originally finished in second place and Leclerc in sixth after starting on pole.

Lewis Hamilton, driving a Ferrari, was disqualified for excessive plank wear at the 2025 Chinese Grand Prix. He had originally finished in sixth place, after starting fifth on the grid.

Nico Hülkenberg, driving a Sauber, was disqualified for excessive plank wear at the 2025 Bahrain Grand Prix. He had originally finished in 15th place, after starting 16th on the grid.

Lando Norris and Oscar Piastri, driving McLaren cars, were disqualified for excessive plank wear at the 2025 Las Vegas Grand Prix, having originally finished in 2nd and 4th respectively.
