= List of Acura vehicles =

This is a list of Acura vehicles. Acura is the luxury division of Honda.

== Current models ==
Model	Calendar year introduced	Current model		Vehicle description
Model	Calendar year introduced	Introduction	Update/facelift	Vehicle description
Sedans/liftbacks
Integra	1986 (nameplate)	2022	2025	Subcompact executive liftback based on the eleventh-generation Honda Civic. To be sold in Japan from 2026.
Crossover SUVs
ADX	2025	2025	–	Subcompact luxury crossover SUV that shares its platform with the Honda HR-V/ZR-V.
MDX	2000	2021	2024	Three-row mid-size luxury crossover SUV that shares its platform with the Honda Pilot.

== Former models ==
Image	Model	Intr.	Disc.	Gen.	Description
	Legend	1986	1995	2	Mid-size luxury coupe and sedan, sold in Japan as the Honda Legend.
	NSX	1991	2022	2	The flagship sports car, globally is the Honda NSX.
	Vigor	1992	1994	1	Mid-size sedan, sold in Japan as the Honda Vigor.
	RL	1996	2012	2	Mid-size luxury sedan, sold in Japan as the Honda Legend.
	SLX	1996	1999	1	Rebadged version of the Isuzu Trooper.
	TL	1996	2014	4	Mid-size sedan, sold in Japan as the Honda Saber and Inspire from 1996-2003, and also the sedan version of the CL from 1997-2003.
	CL	1997	2003	2	Personal luxury coupe, also the coupe version of the TL.
	EL	1997	2005	2	Subcompact executive sedan and a rebadged version of the Civic sold only in Canada.
	RSX	2002	2006	1	Compact coupe, and a rebadged version of the Fourth Generation Honda Integra of North America.
	TSX	2004	2014	2	Compact executive sedan, also sold in Japan and Europe as the Honda Accord and First Generation Honda Spirior, and a Station wagon called the Sport Wagon from 2011-2014.
	CSX	2006	2011	1	Subcompact executive sedan and a rebadged version of the Civic sold only in Canada.
	RDX	2006	2026	3	Compact luxury crossover SUV related to the Honda CR-V.
	ZDX	2009	2025	2	Battery electric mid-size luxury crossover SUV related to the Honda Prologue. Before nameplate was a Mid-size luxury crossover SUV based on the Honda Crosstour.
	ILX	2013	2022	1	Subcompact executive sedan, based on the Civic.
	RLX	2014	2020	1	Executive sedan, Sold in Japan as the Honda Legend.
	TLX	2014	2025	2	Compact executive sedan succeeding the TL and TSX.
	CDX	2016	2022	1	Subcompact luxury crossover SUV, related to the Honda HR-V. sold only in China.

== Concept vehicles ==
- Acura Performance EV (2024, entered production as the Acura RSX in 2026, later cancelled)
- Acura Precision EV (2022, entered production as the Acura ZDX in 2024)
- Acura Precision (2016)
- Acura GSX (2009)
- Acura Hybrid SUV Prototype (2026)
- Acura Stealth (2008)
- Acura 2+1 (2008)
- Acura Advanced Sports Car (2007)
- Acura Advanced Sedan (2006)
- Acura CL-X (1995, entered production as the Acura CL in 1996)
- Acura Nexera (2026)

== See also ==
- List of Honda automobiles
