= Honda Crider =

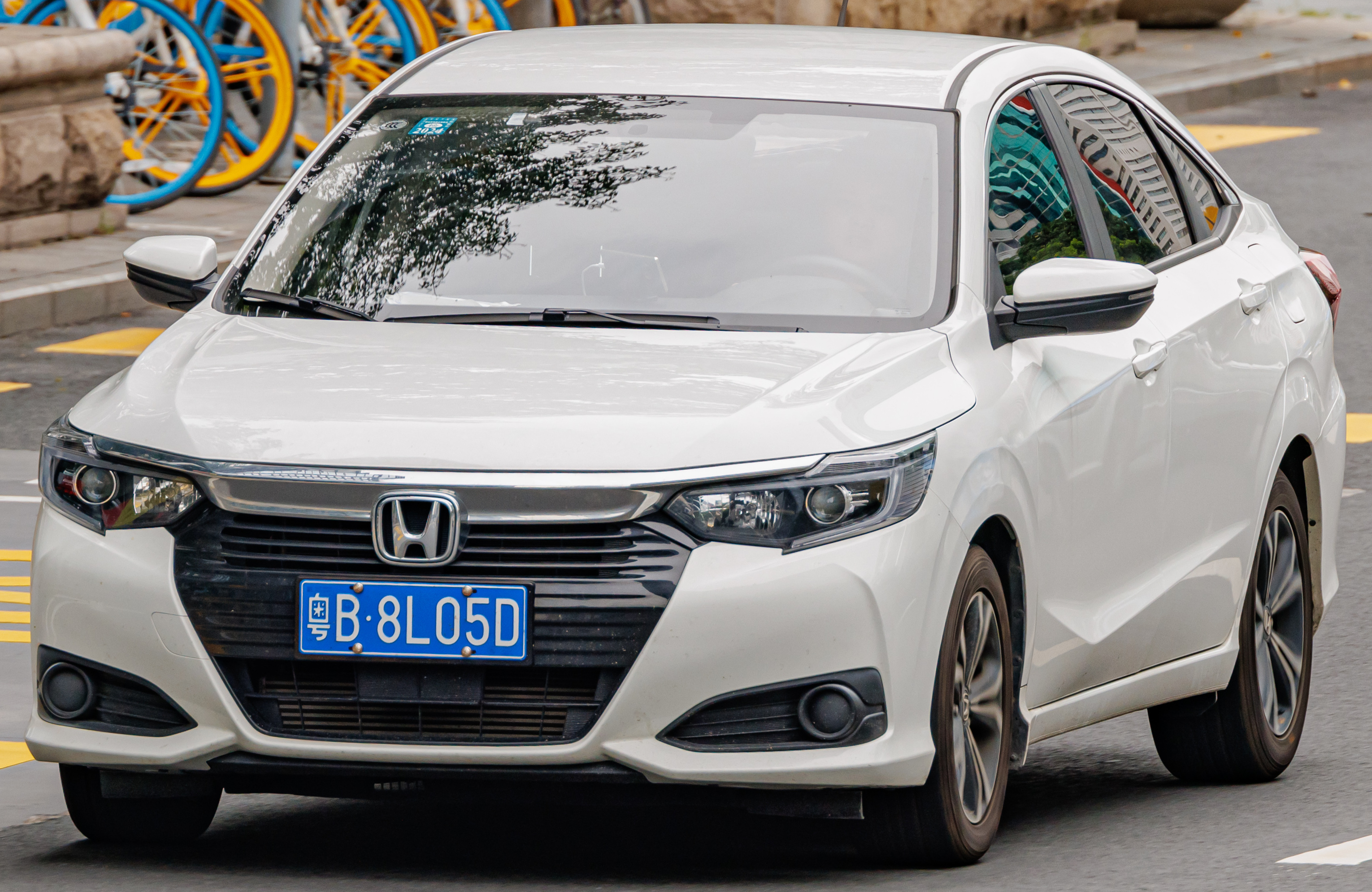

Overview
- Manufacturer: Honda
- Also called: Honda Envix (Dongfeng Honda, 2019–2025)
- Production: 2013–2025
- Assembly: China: Guangzhou (Crider; GAC Honda); Wuhan (Envix; Dongfeng Honda)
- Designer: Yin Lu

Body and chassis
- Class: Compact car
- Body style: 4-door sedan
- Layout: Front-engine, front-wheel-drive

The Honda Crider (Chinese: 凌派; pinyin: Língpài) is a compact sedan produced by GAC Honda in China. It was introduced in 2013.

The production first generation Honda Crider is an evolution of the Honda Concept C from Beijing Auto Show in 2012, and the production Honda Crider went on sale in from June 2013 produced by GAC-Honda. The Crider is designed to fill the gap between the City and Civic and sold exclusively in China, and was built on an extended version of the Honda City platform. Like all the other Honda products sold in China, the twin model called the Honda Envix produced by the Dongfeng-Honda joint venture was available from 2019, sharing the platform with the second generation Crider.

== First generation (2013) ==
First generation
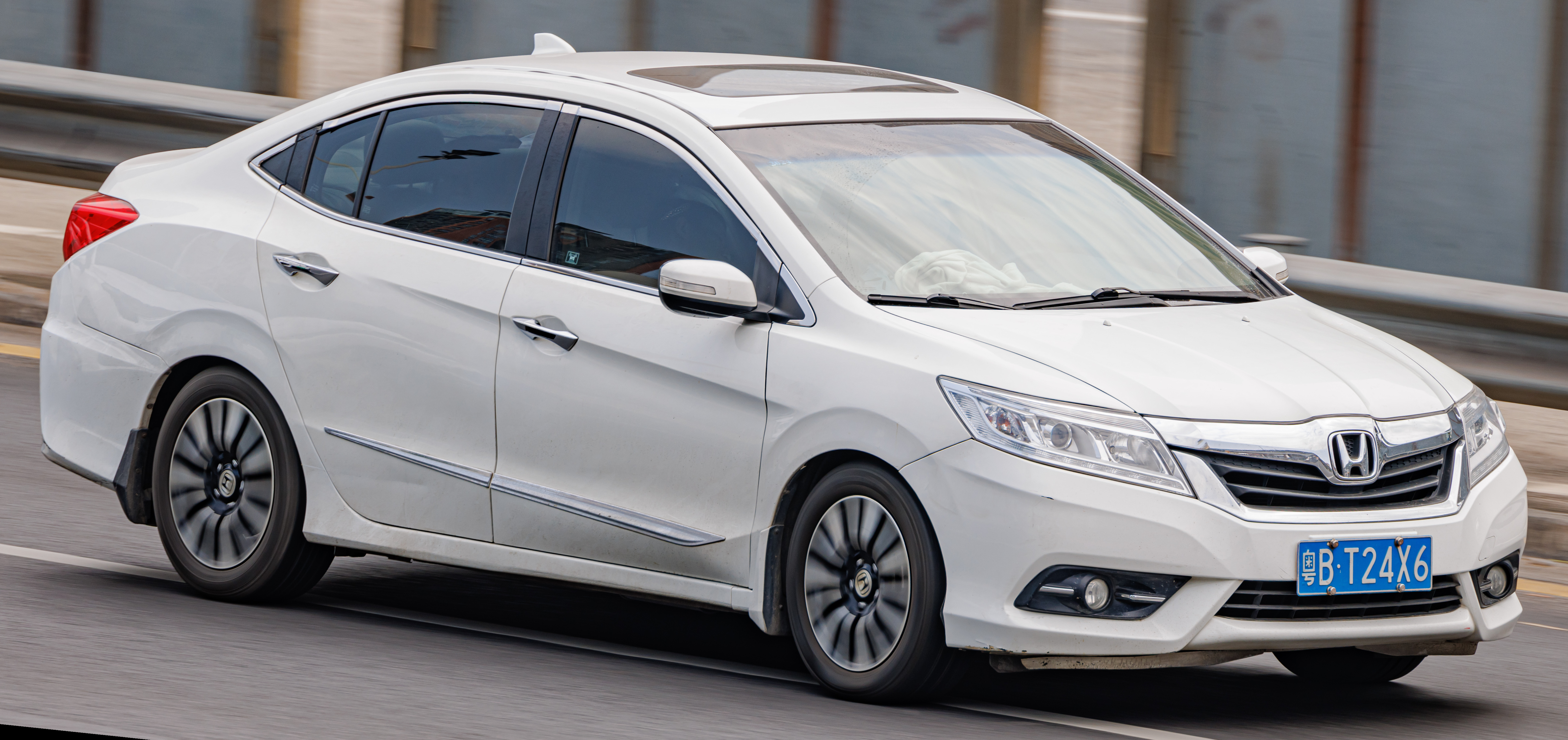
- Honda Crider (pre-facelift)

Overview
- Production: 2013–2018
- Designer: Akio Fumiiri

Body and chassis
- Related: Honda City; Honda Civic

Powertrain
- Engine: Petrol: 1.8 L R18Z5 i-VTEC SOHC I4; 1.8 L R18ZH i-VTEC SOHC I4
- Transmission: 5-speed manual; 5-speed automatic; CVT

Dimensions
- Wheelbase: 2,650 mm (104.3 in)
- Length: 4,650 mm (183.1 in)
- Width: 1,750 mm (68.9 in)
- Height: 1,505 mm (59.3 in)

The first-generation Crider was launched in June 2013. It is based on a stretched City body architecture.

The first-generation Crider is equipped with a 1.8-litre i-VTEC four-cylinder engine shared with the Honda Civic. The engine was tuned to produce a maximum horsepower of 137 hp (102 kW; 139 PS) at 6,500 rpm and 172 N⋅m (127 lb⋅ft) of peak torque at 4,300 rpm, paired to a standard 5-speed manual transmission or an optional 5-speed automatic transmission. It has an independent MacPherson strut front suspension and a single torsion beam rear suspension. All models feature four-wheel disc brakes and electric power steering. The combined fuel consumption of the Crider is 6.5 L/100 km (15.4 km/L; 43.5 mpg_{‑imp}; 36.2 mpg_{‑US}) for the manual transmission version and 6.7 L/100 km (14.9 km/L; 42.2 mpg_{‑imp}; 35.1 mpg_{‑US}) for the automatic transmission version.

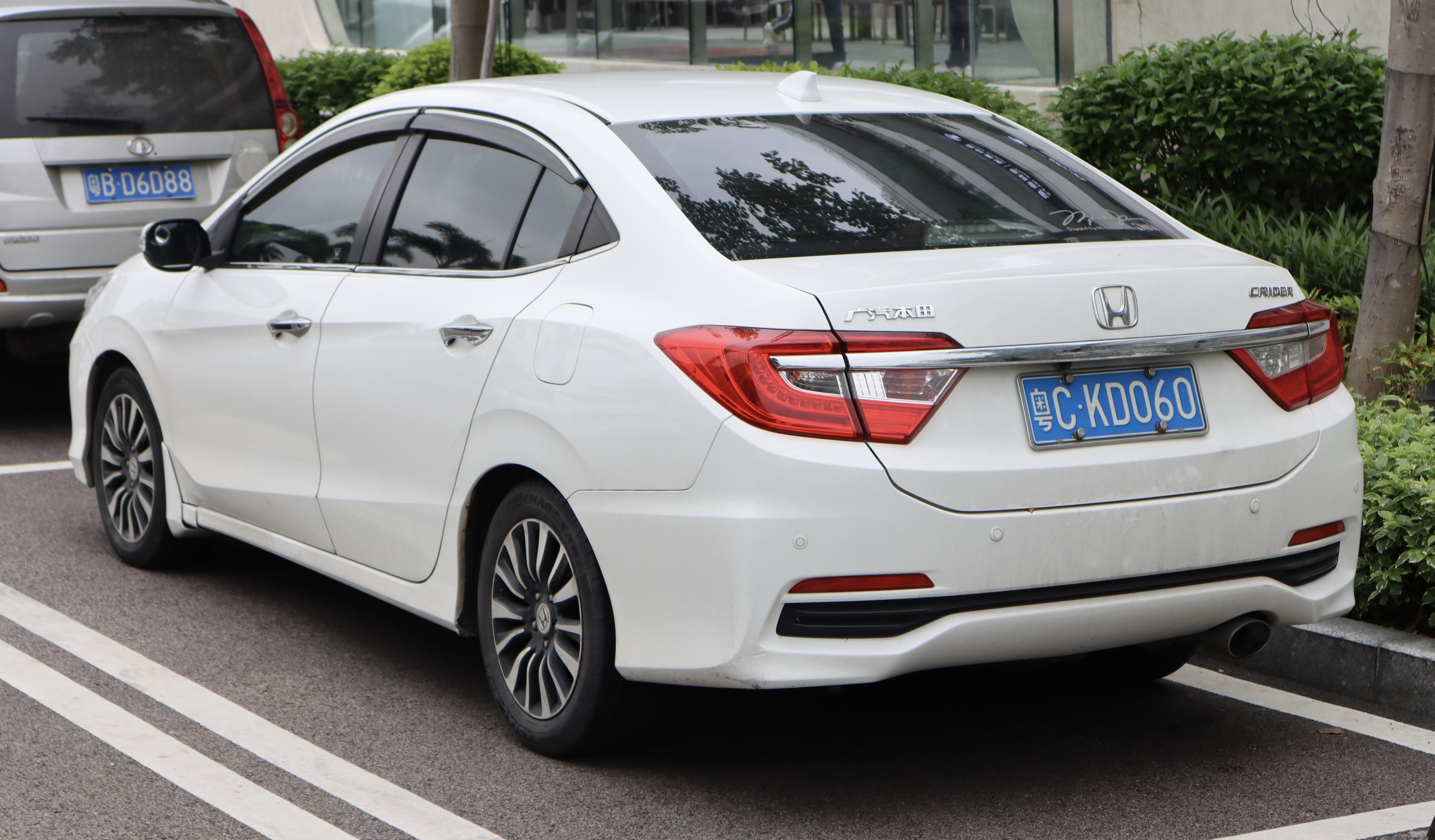
Rear view

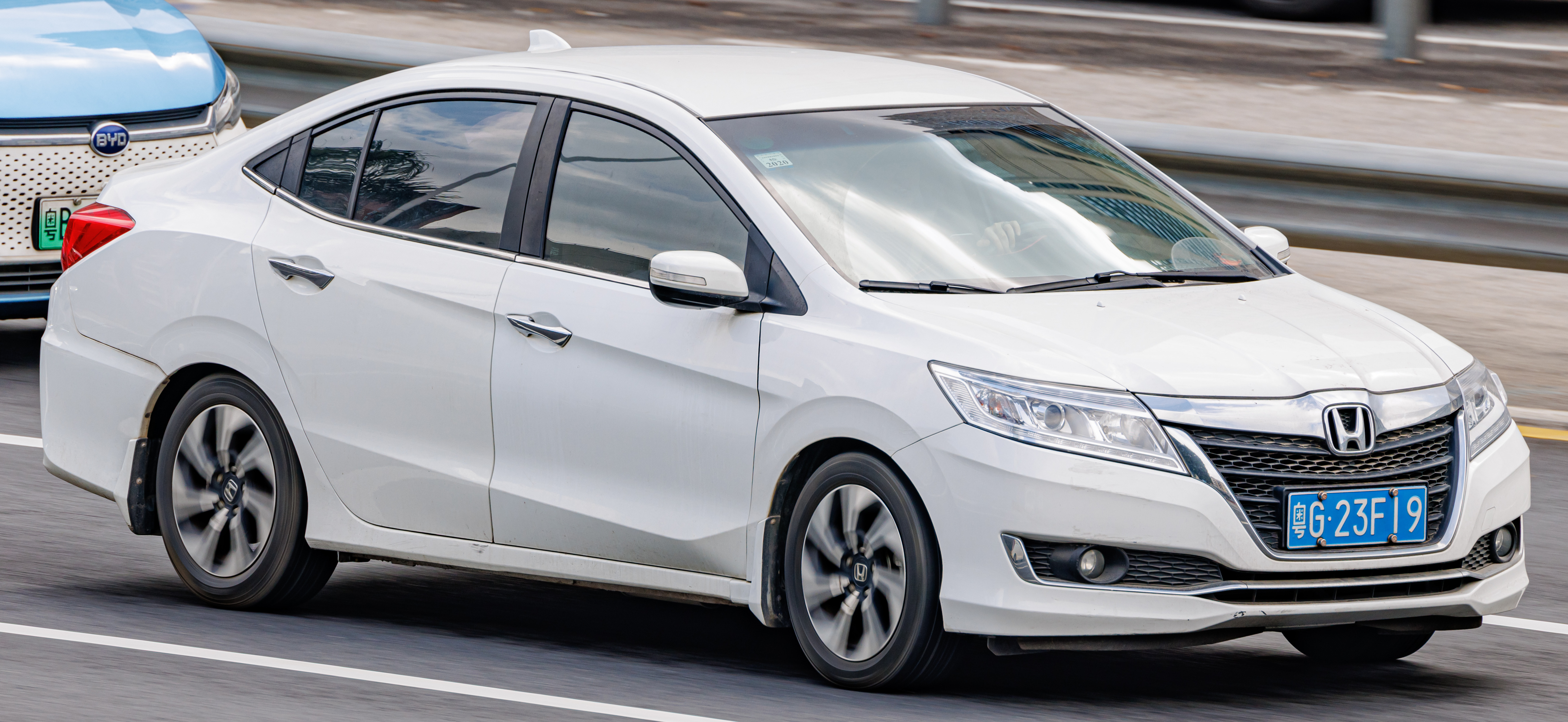
Honda Crider (facelift)

== Second generation (2018) ==
Second generation
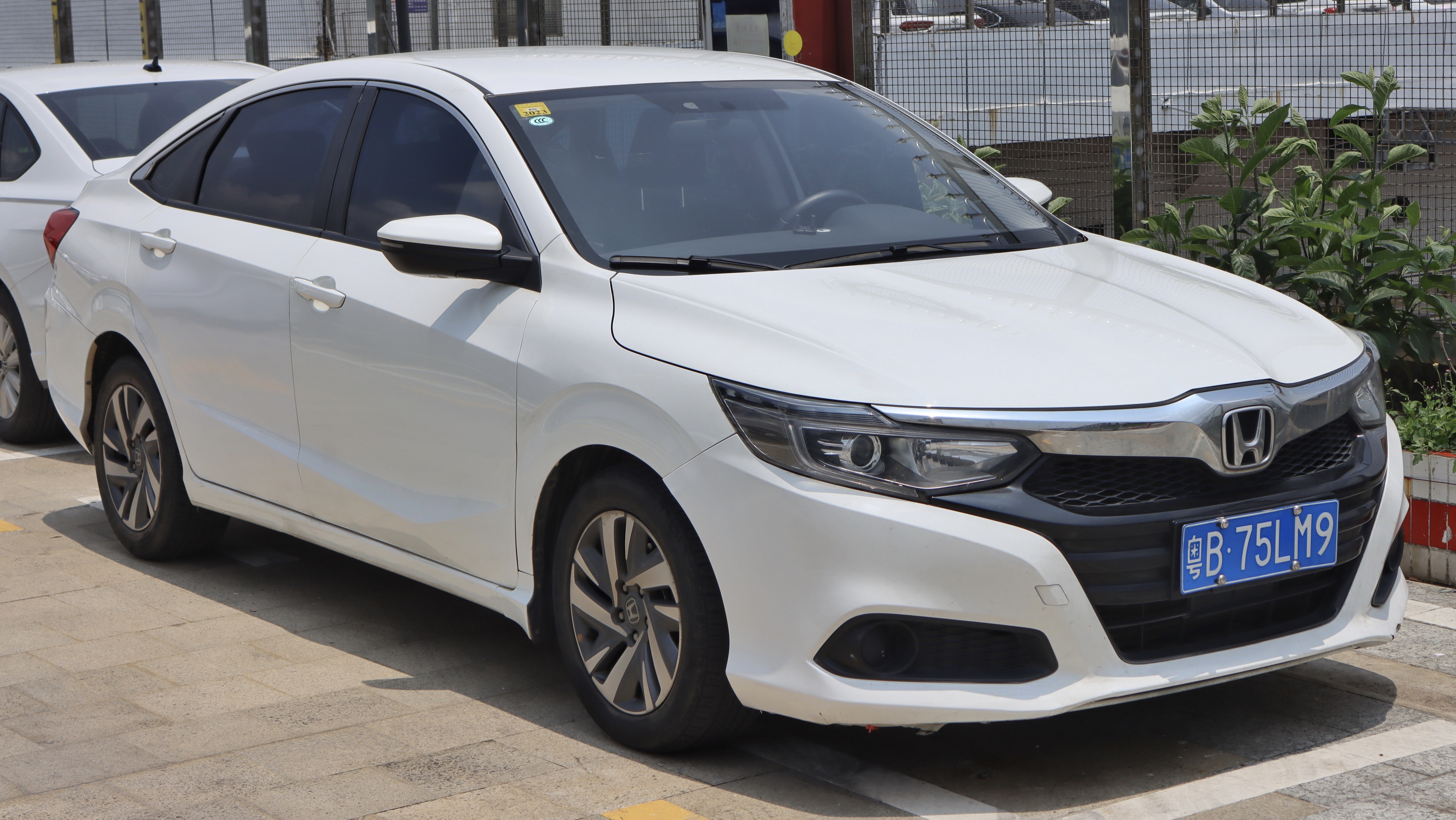
- 2018 Honda Crider 180 Turbo

Overview
- Also called: Honda Envix (Dongfeng Honda)
- Production: 2018–2025
- Designer: Yin Lu / Tomoya Ohashi

Powertrain
- Engine: Petrol: 1.0 L P10A2 VTEC Turbo DOHC I3-T; Hybrid: 1.5 L LEB-MMD Atkinson cycle DOHC i-MMD I4
- Transmission: CVT

Dimensions
- Wheelbase: 2,730 mm (107.5 in)
- Length: 4,756 mm (187.2 in)
- Width: 1,804 mm (71.0 in)
- Height: 1,509 mm (59.4 in)

The second-generation Crider was launched in September 2018. It is equipped with a 1.0-litre turbocharged petrol engine that produces 122 PS (90 kW; 120 hp) and 173 N⋅m (128 lb⋅ft) of torque mated to a CVT gearbox, and has a fuel consumption rating of 4.9 L/100 km (20.4 km/L; 57.6 mpg_{‑imp}; 48.0 mpg_{‑US}).

The facelifted second-generation Crider was launched in September 2021.

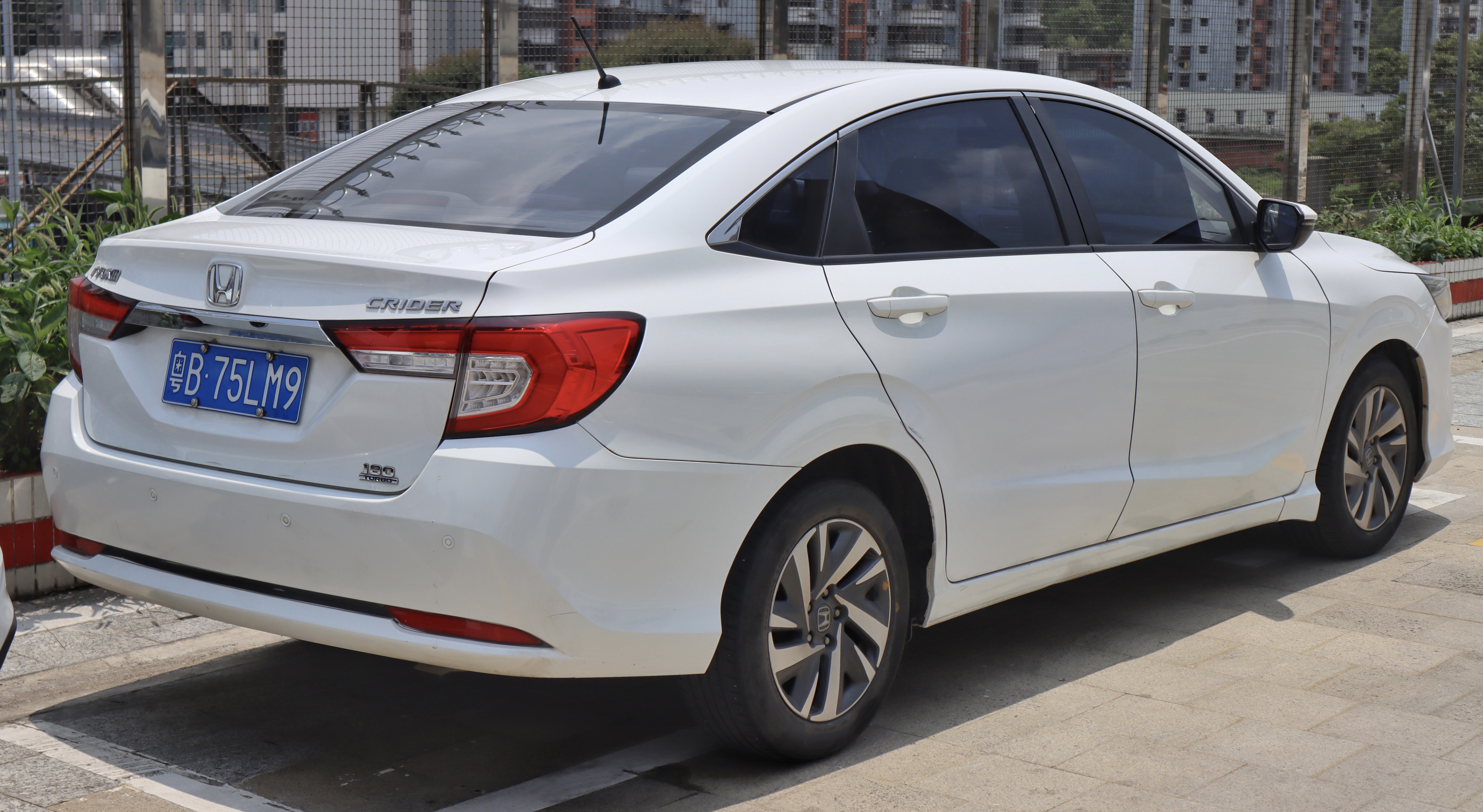
Rear view (Pre-Facelift)

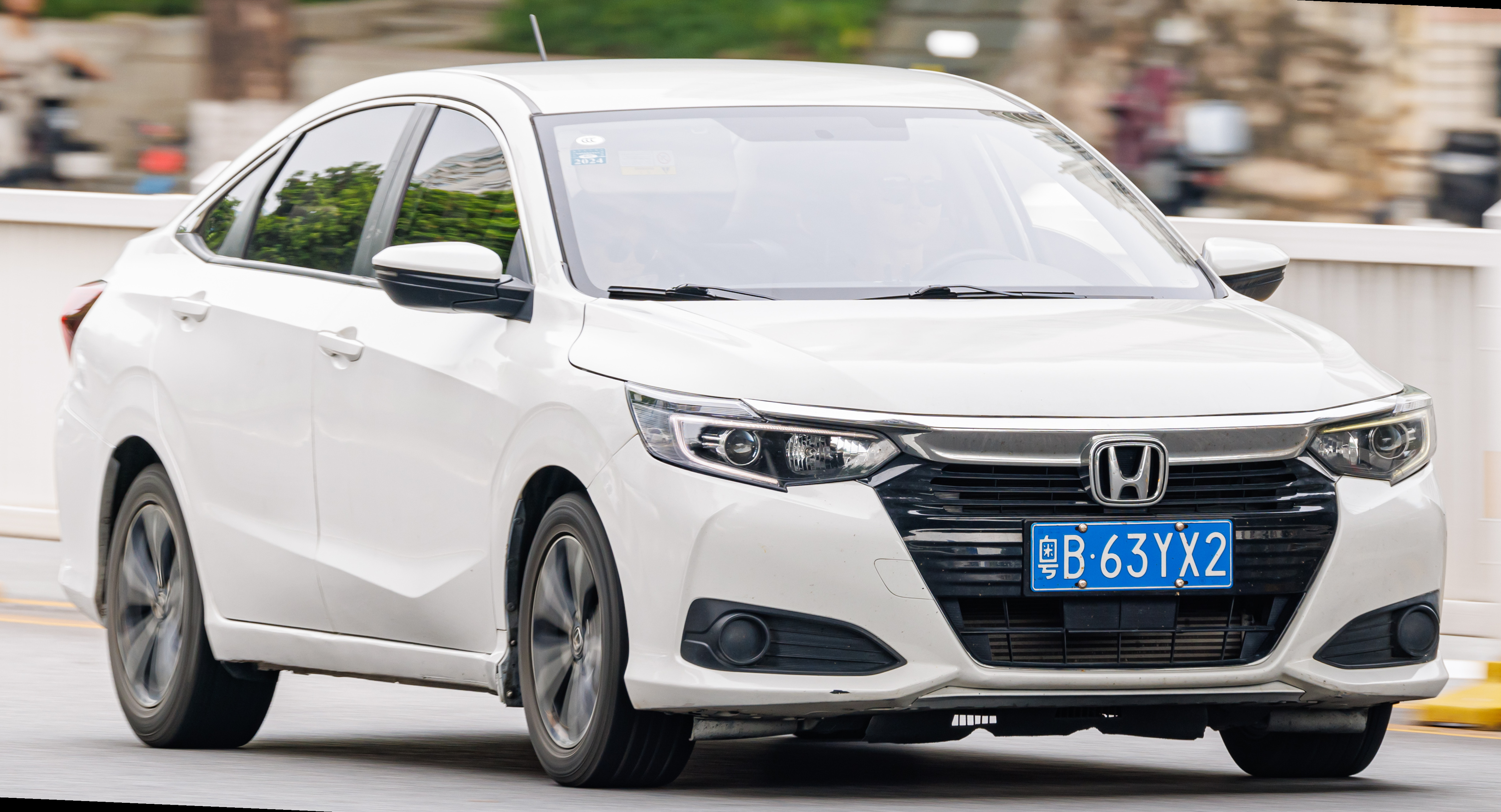
Facelift

=== Honda Envix ===
A rebadged version called Honda Envix (Chinese: 享域; pinyin: Xiǎngyu) is sold by Dongfeng Honda from 2019. The Honda Envix has a different front grille design and more aggressive bumpers. Different alloy wheels and an inverted license plate indentation is also featured to differentiate from the Crider. The interior design of the Envix is the same as the Crider with the upholstery used in both cars being different.

The Honda Envix is equipped with the same P10A5 1.0-litre turbocharged three-cylinder petrol engine that develops 122 PS (90 kW; 120 hp) and 173 N⋅m (128 lb⋅ft) of torque shared with the Crider. Transmission is a 6-speed manual transmission or a continuously variable transmission.

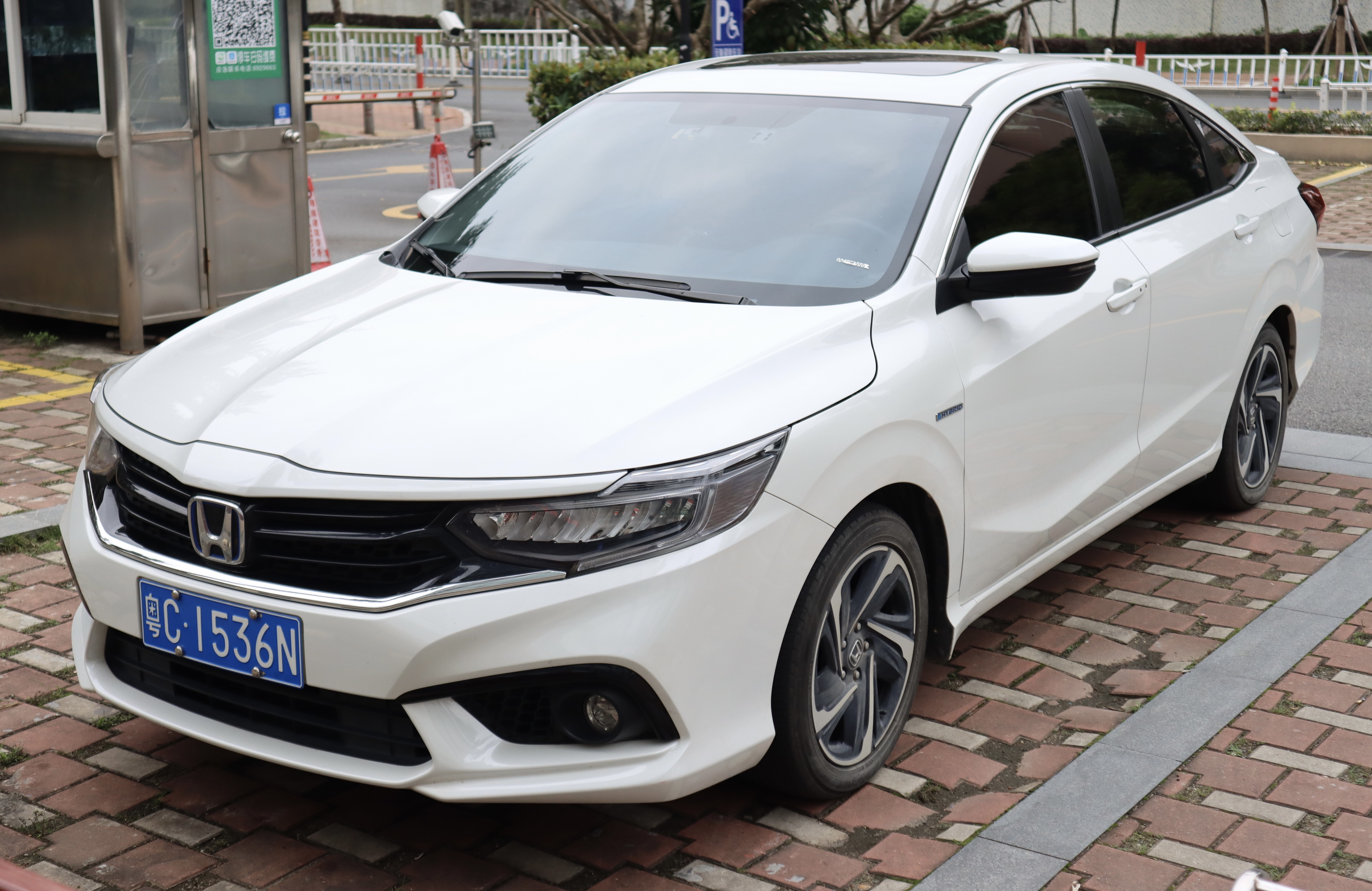
Honda Envix (Pre-Facelift) front view

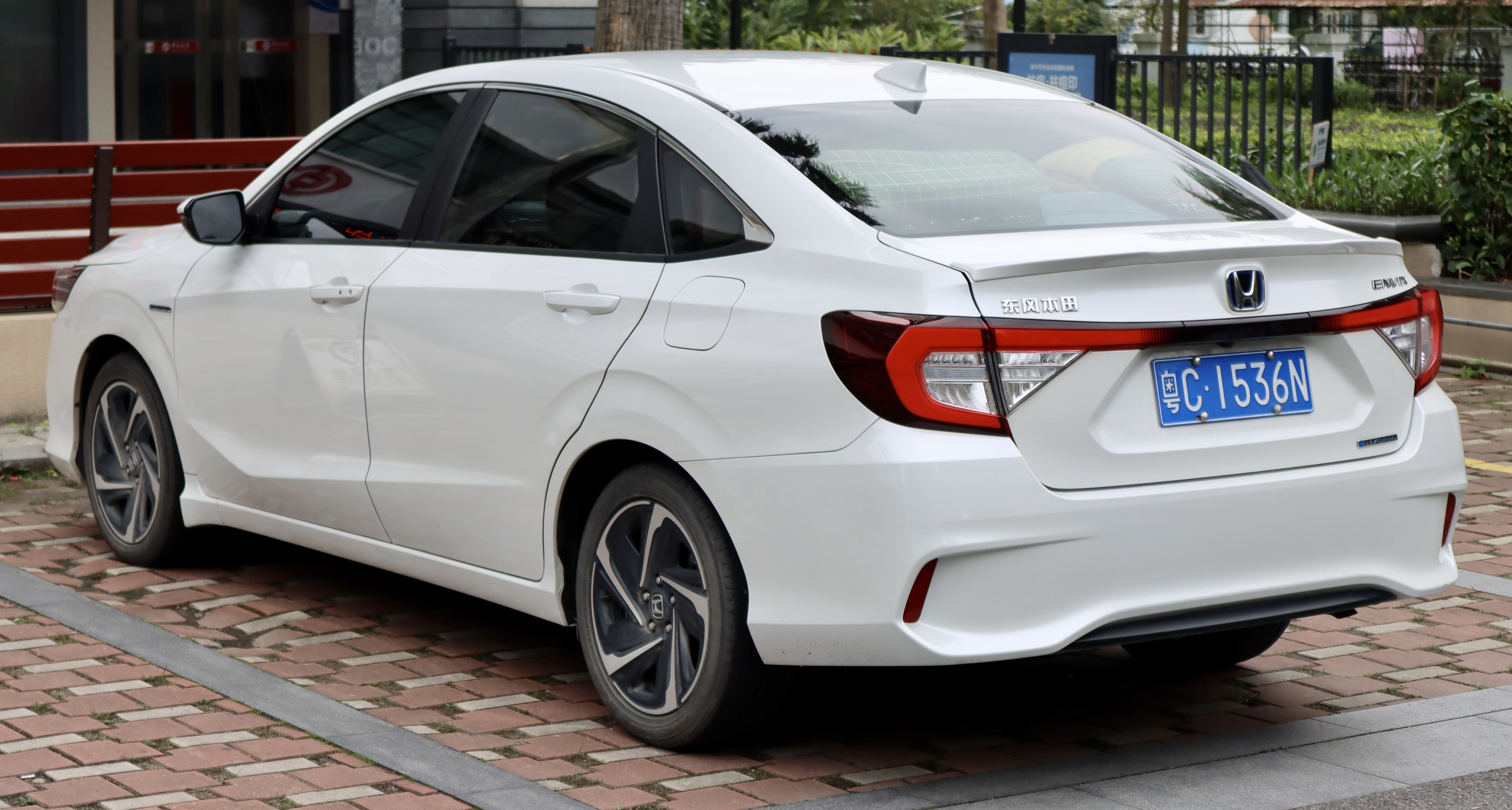
Honda Envix (Pre-Facelift) rear view

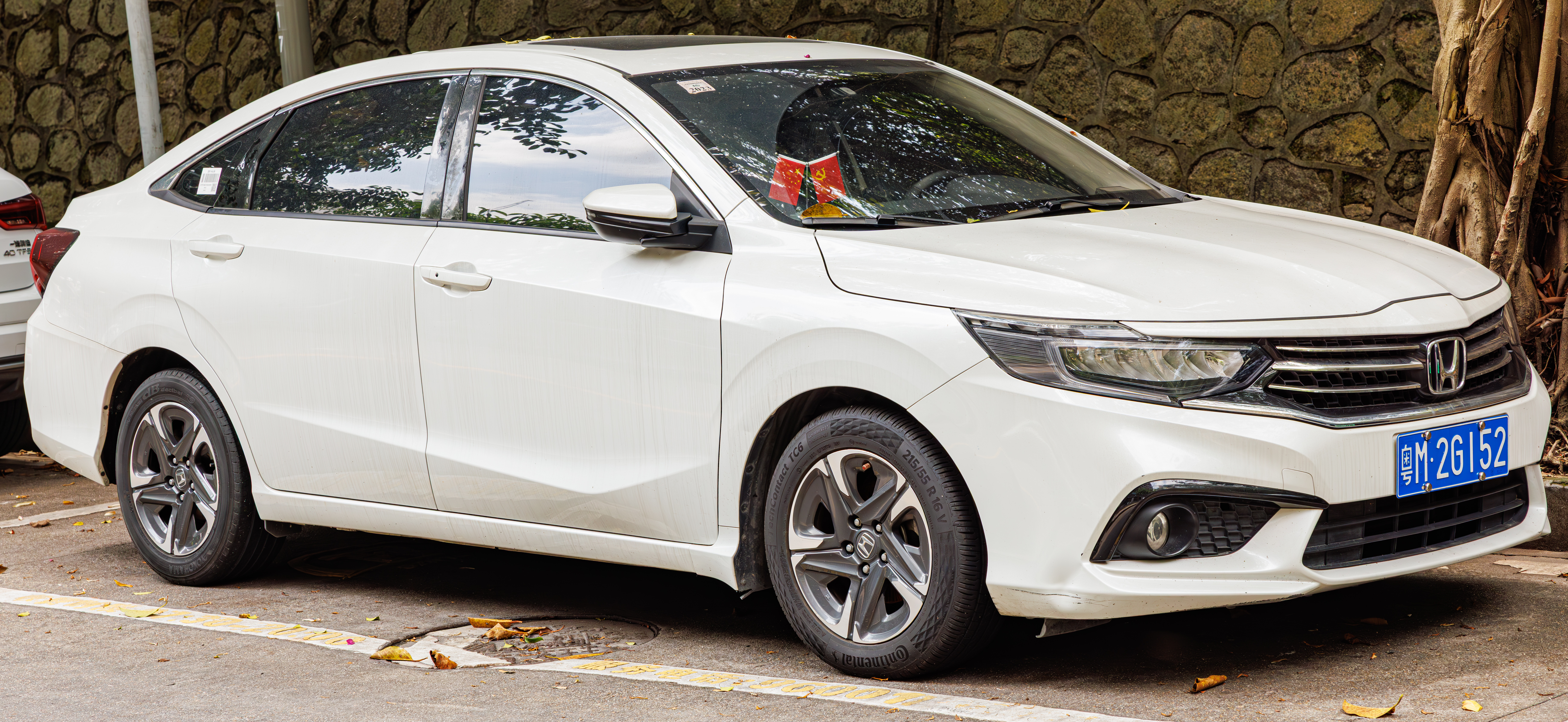
Honda Envix (Facelift) front view

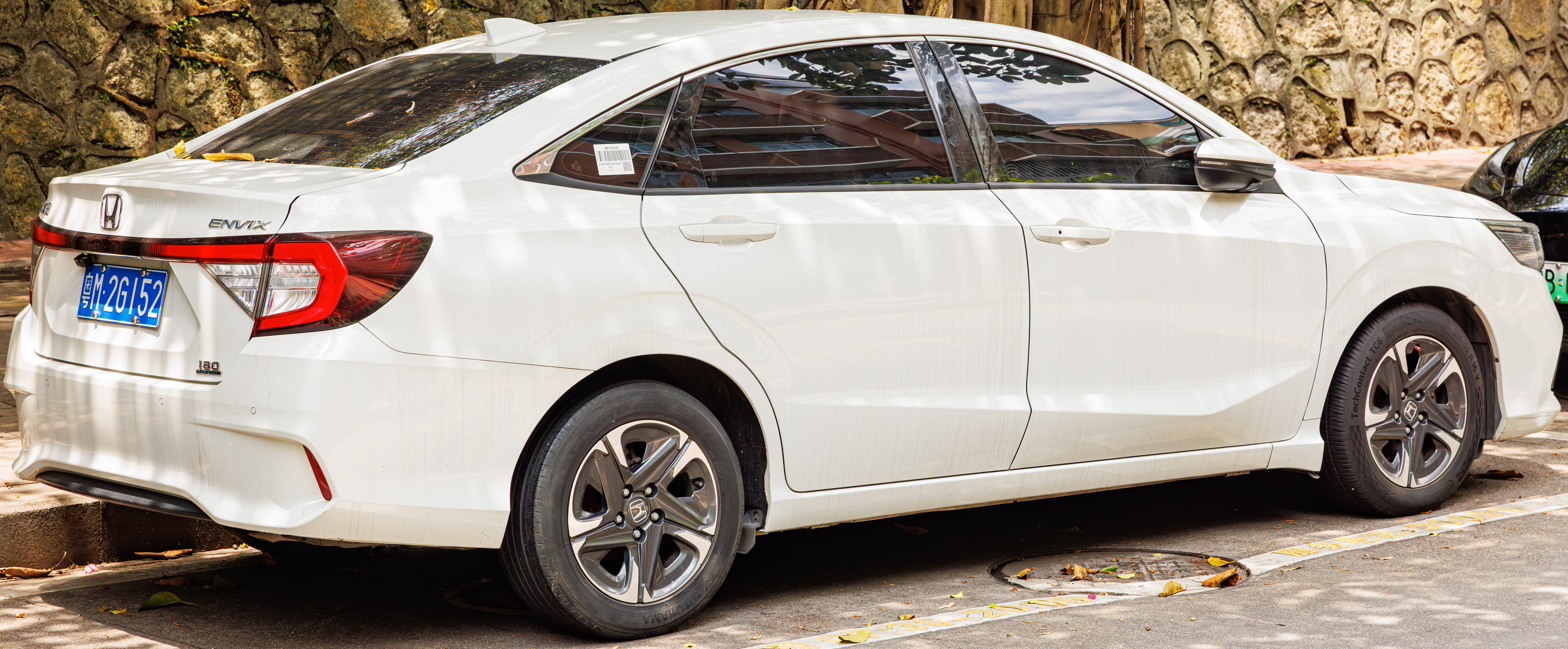
Honda Envix (Facelift) rear view

== Sales ==
Year	China	
Year	Crider	Envix
2023	10,431	9,230
2024	678	74
2025	1,734	1
