= Honda RC100 =

Prototype Formula One car

Honda RC-F1 1.5X (Honda RC101 / RC1B-101)
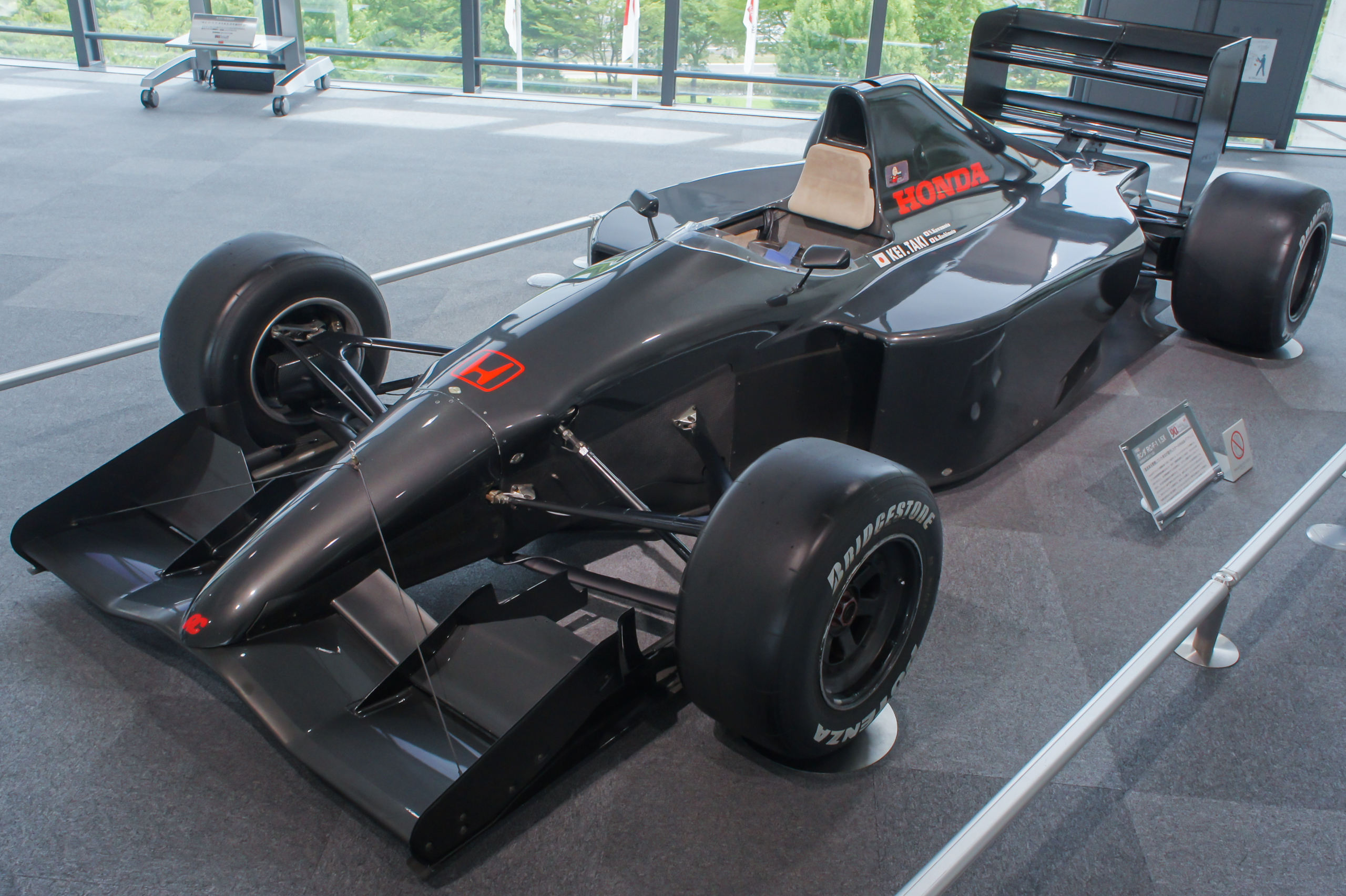
- Category: Formula One
- Constructor: Honda
- Designers: Ken Hashimoto (project leader, Honda R&D); Keinosuke Taki (development chief, Honda R&D)

Technical specifications
- Engine: Honda RA122E 3.5 L (213.583 cu in) V12
- Transmission: 6-speed Honda semi-auto
- Power: 740–770 hp (552–574 kW; 750–781 PS) @ 14,500 rpm
- Tyres: Bridgestone (for F3000)

Competition history
- Notable drivers: (Japan) Keinosuke Taki (Japan) Satoru Nakajima

Honda RC-F1 2.0X (Honda RC101B / RC2-001)
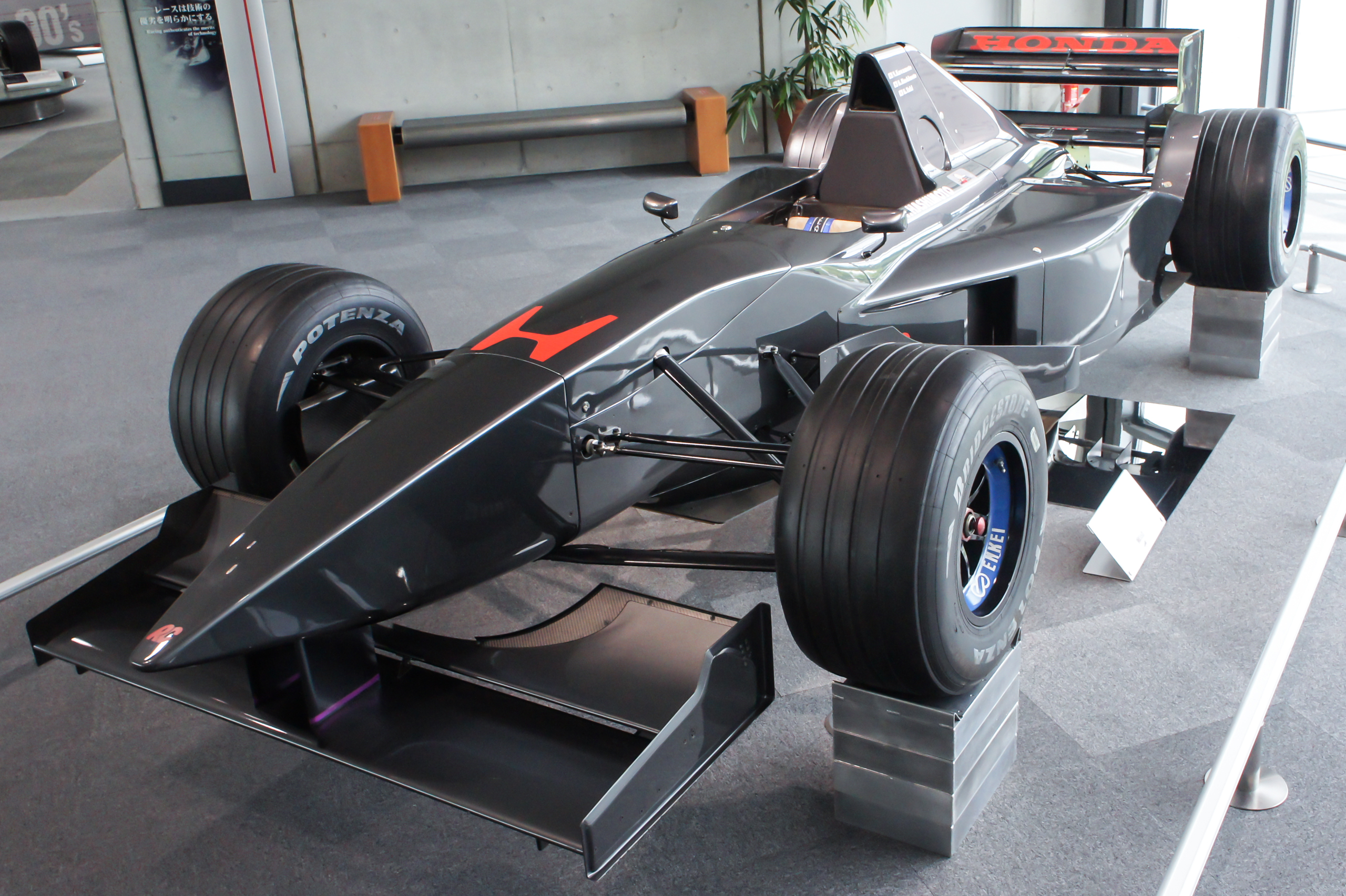
- Category: Formula One
- Constructor: Honda
- Designers: Ken Hashimoto (project leader, Honda R&D); Keinosuke Taki (development chief, Honda R&D)

Technical specifications
- Engine: Mugen-Honda 3.0 L (183.1 cu in) V10
- Transmission: 6-speed Honda semi-auto
- Power: 670 hp (500 kW; 679 PS) @ 13,500 rpm
- Tyres: Bridgestone (for F3000)

Competition history
- Notable drivers: (Japan) Keinosuke Taki (Japan) Ryo Michigami

The Honda RC100 (also known as Honda RC-F1 1.0X, chassis number RC1-203/1) was a prototype Formula One car built by engineers from Honda R&D Center, Tochigi, although not as an official project of Honda.

Honda RC-F1 1.0X (Honda RC100 / RC1-203/1)
- Category: Formula One
- Constructor: Honda
- Designers: Ken Hashimoto (project leader, Honda R&D); Keinosuke Taki (development chief, Honda R&D)

Technical specifications
- Engine: Honda RA121E 3.5 L (213.583 cu in) V12
- Power: 740–770 hp (552–574 kW; 750–781 PS) @ 14,500 rpm
- Tyres: Bridgestone (for F3000)

Competition history
- Notable drivers: (Japan) Keinosuke Taki (Japan) Ken Hashimoto

In 1991, Honda developed the RC100, powered by a Honda V12 and featuring a chassis inspired by the McLaren MP4/6. Wind tunnel tests proved unsatisfactory, leading the engineers to refine the prototype by adopting elements from the 1992 Footwork FA13 and equipping it with a more powerful engine. The updated RC101B was presented to the specialized press in February 1992 and tested by Honda president Nobuhiko Kawamoto before further modifications and track testing by Satoru Nakajima at the Suzuka Circuit.

An evolved RC101 was unveiled to the public in January 1994 alongside the RC101B, which complied with the 1994 technical regulations. The RC101B's front end drew from the Benetton B193 and used a Mugen-Honda V10. Regulatory changes following the fatal accidents of Roland Ratzenberger and Ayrton Senna at the 1994 San Marino Grand Prix prompted ongoing updates to the RC101B through 1996.

== Background and development ==
=== Honda's involvement in Formula One during the 1960s ===
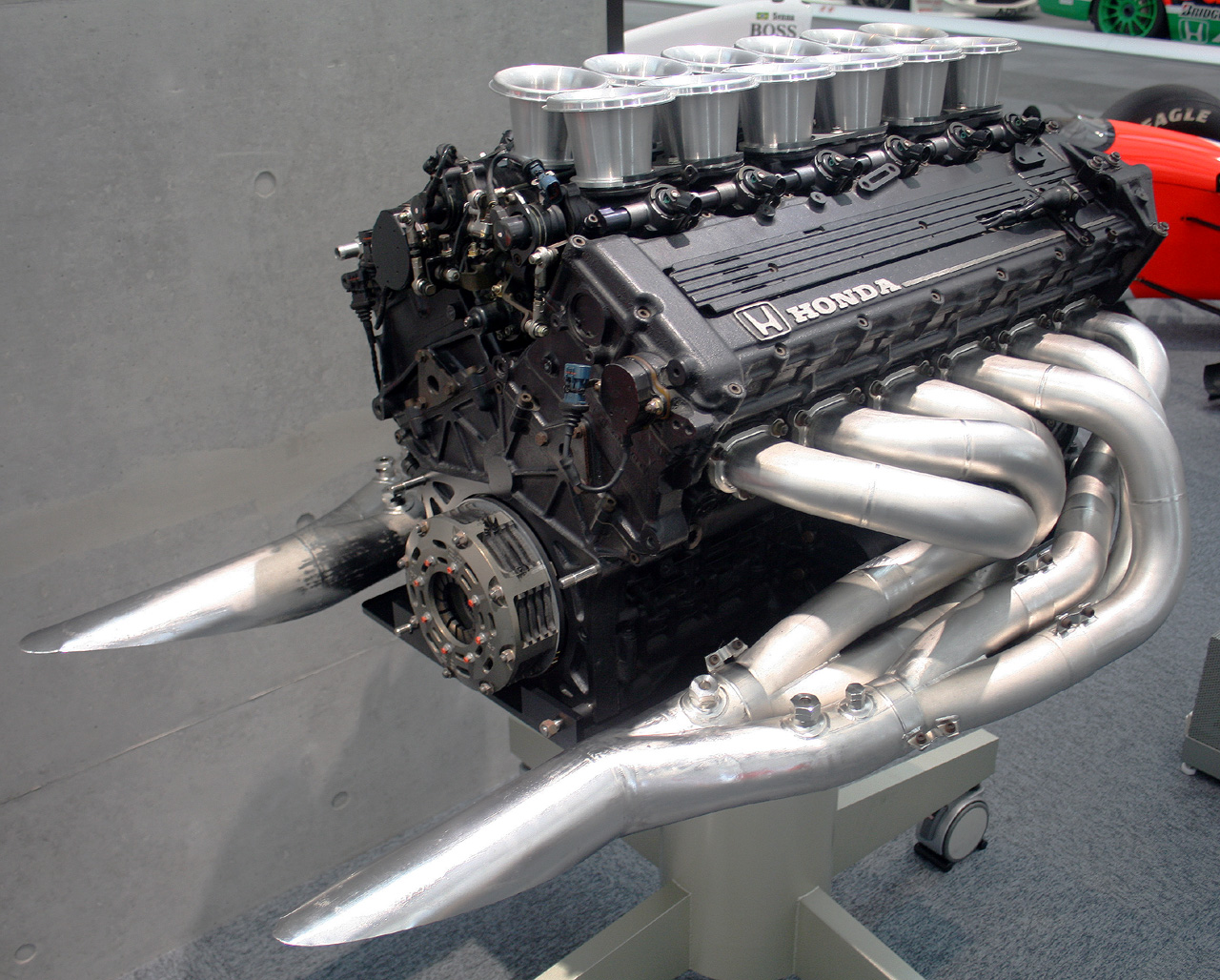
The 3.5-liter RA121 V12 engine used in the RC100.

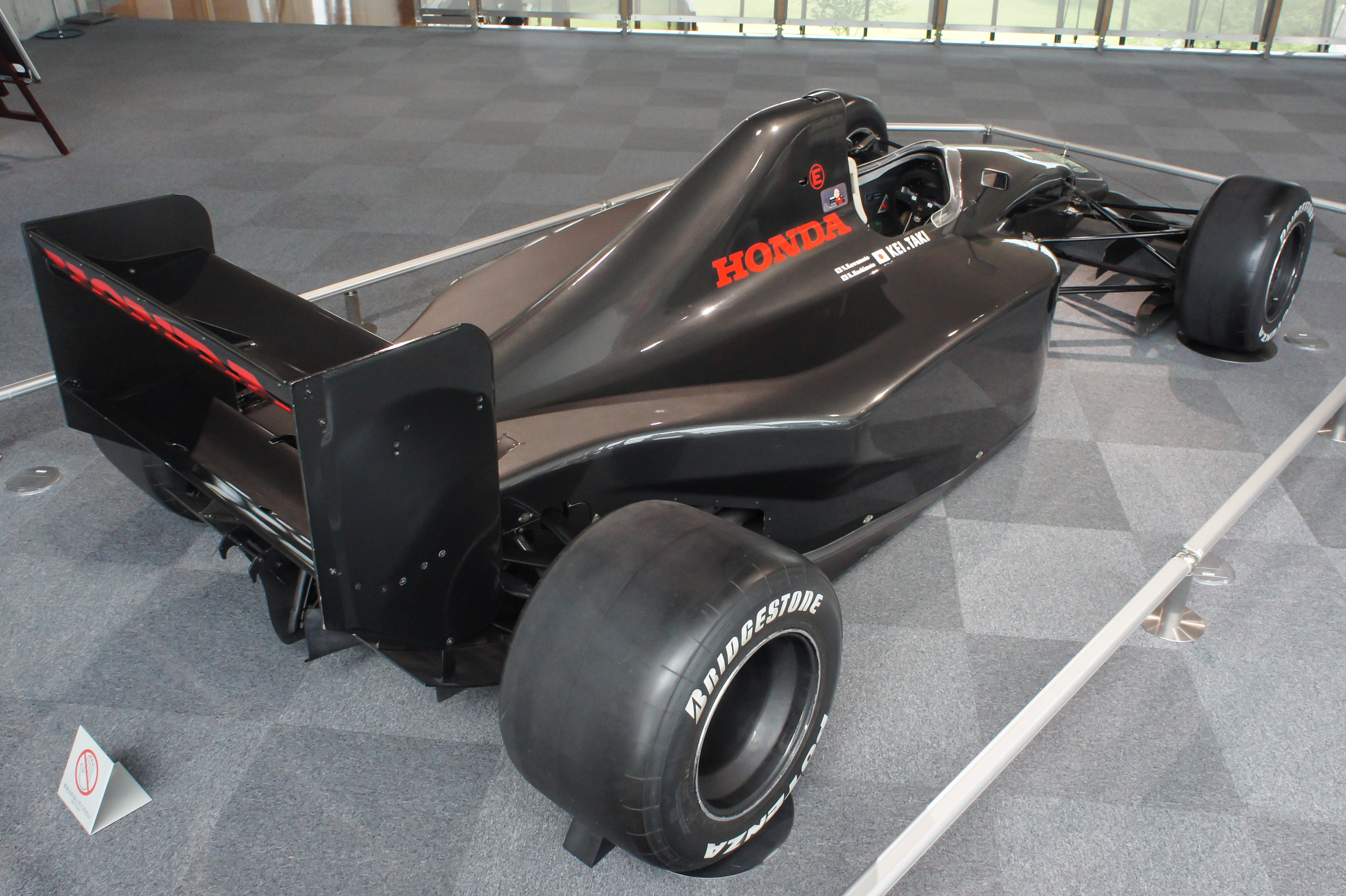
Rear view of the RC101 at the Honda Collection Hall.

Soichiro Honda, the founder of the Honda automobile brand, aimed to achieve success in international motorsport. In preparation for entry into Formula One, Honda acquired a 2.5-liter Coventry Climax engine for study. Initial plans involved supplying engines to Lotus, but negotiations ended abruptly in early 1964, leading Honda to develop its own chassis. The Honda RA271, equipped with a V12 engine, was created by engineers at the Honda Research Center.

In the 1964 Formula One season, the RA271, driven by Ronnie Bucknum, failed to finish any races. The following year, two Honda RA272 cars competed, culminating in a victory for Richie Ginther at the 1965 Mexican Grand Prix.

The Honda RA273 in 1966 proved unreliable. For 1967, Honda outsourced chassis design to Lola Cars, resulting in the lighter Honda RA300, which won the 1967 Italian Grand Prix with John Surtees. The partnership ended in 1968, and the Honda RA301 suffered reliability issues, leading Honda to withdraw from Formula One that year.

=== Engine supplier success in the 1980s ===
Honda returned to Formula One in 1983 as an engine supplier, partnering with Spirit Racing using a turbocharged V6. The company later supplied Williams, contributing to constructors' championships in 1986 and 1987. From 1988 to 1992, Honda powered McLaren to four constructors' titles. As an engine supplier from 1984 to 1992, Honda secured 68 Grand Prix victories.

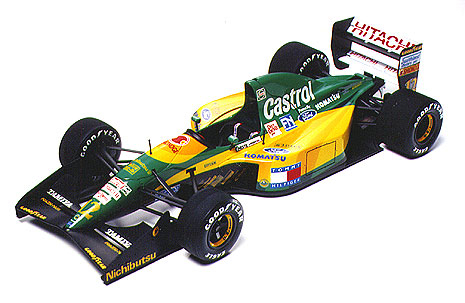
The Lotus 107...

President Nobuhiko Kawamoto noted differing objectives between McLaren and Honda, leading to withdrawal after the 1992 season to focus on the American CART series.

== 1991: RC-F1 1.0X (RC100) ==
In 1991, under Ken Hashimoto and Keinosuke Taki, engineers at Honda R&D in Tochigi initiated the RC100 project in collaboration with the Tokyo Institute of Technology and Yokohama National University. Funded by Honda but conducted outside work hours, the carbon-fiber monocoque and suspensions were designed using engineering calculations. The car resembled the McLaren MP4/6, featured a six-speed sequential gearbox, and was powered by the RA121 V12 producing 710 hp (530 kW) at 13,000 rpm (220 Hz). Painted white, it underwent wind tunnel testing, with details revealed in a February 1992 The Japan Times article.

== 1992: RC-F1 1.5X (RC101) ==
By mid-1992, the chassis was revised for 1993 regulations. The RC101B drew from the Lotus 107 and Footwork FA13, weighed 510 kg (1,120 lb), and used a titanium semi-automatic gearbox with the RA122 V12 producing 770 hp (570 kW) at 14,500 rpm (242 Hz). It featured unique sidepod rears, no active suspension, and Bridgestone tires. Kawamoto tested it in 1992, and it passed an FIA crash test in March 1993. Nakajima tested an updated version with Williams-inspired front elements in 1994.

== 1994: RC-F1 2.0X (RC101B) ==
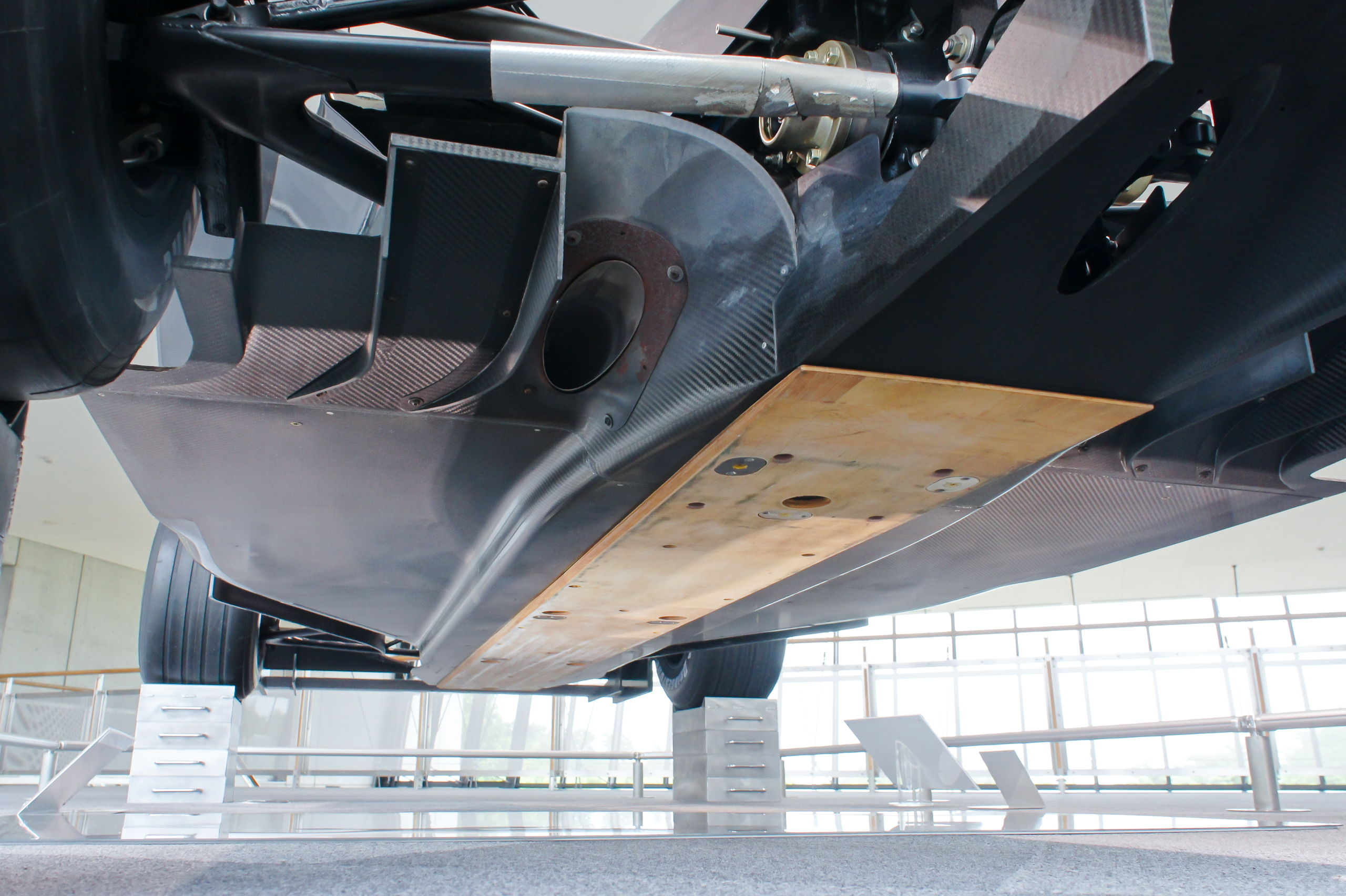
One of main focuses of development of the RC-F1 2.0X is making it adapt to latest technical regulation of those days, such as the stepped bottom.

Unveiled in January 1994, the RC101B complied with 1994 regulations, featuring a raised nose from the Benetton B193 and a Mugen-Honda MF-351H V10 producing 710 hp (530 kW) at 13,500 rpm (225 Hz). Post-Imola regulatory changes led to modifications, including a stepped floor with a wooden skid block, reduced diffuser, and later a 3.0-liter MF-301H V10 producing 670 hp (500 kW). It used grooved tires per 1998 rules and last ran in 1996.

== Subsequent fate ==
The RC101 and 1996-spec RC101B have been on display at the Honda Collection Hall in Twin Ring Motegi since 2002. The project influenced Honda's consideration of a full constructor return in 1999.
