= Honda Argento Vivo =

Motor vehicle by Honda

Overview
- Manufacturer: Honda
- Production: 1995
- Designer: Davide Arcangeli at Pininfarina

Body and chassis
- Class: Concept car
- Body style: 2-door roadster

Powertrain
- Engine: 2.5 L Honda G inline-5 7.3 L Mercedes-Benz M120 V12

Dimensions
- Curb weight: 1,240 kg (2,733.7 lb)

The Honda Argento Vivo was a concept car designed by Davide Arcangeli at Pininfarina studio under the Honda brand. It was presented at the 1995 Tokyo Motor Show.

The very low silhouette of the car was finished with a front strip with narrow headlights, and the car body was made of aluminum and fiberglass. The car was also equipped with a hard, foldable roof. The interior was dominated by leather, aluminum and wood.

The Argento Vivo offered a 2.5 L, 5-cylinder engine with a power of 190 HP driving the rear wheels. After its presentation, the car won several industrial awards. Hassanal Bolkiah, the Sultan of Brunei liked the Argento Vivo so much, he ordered five vehicles for his collection with changes to the suspension, brakes, gearbox and a Mercedes-AMG borrowed 7.3-litre V12 M120 engine. Each of them cost over US$2 million.
