= Honda WOW =

Motor vehicle by Honda

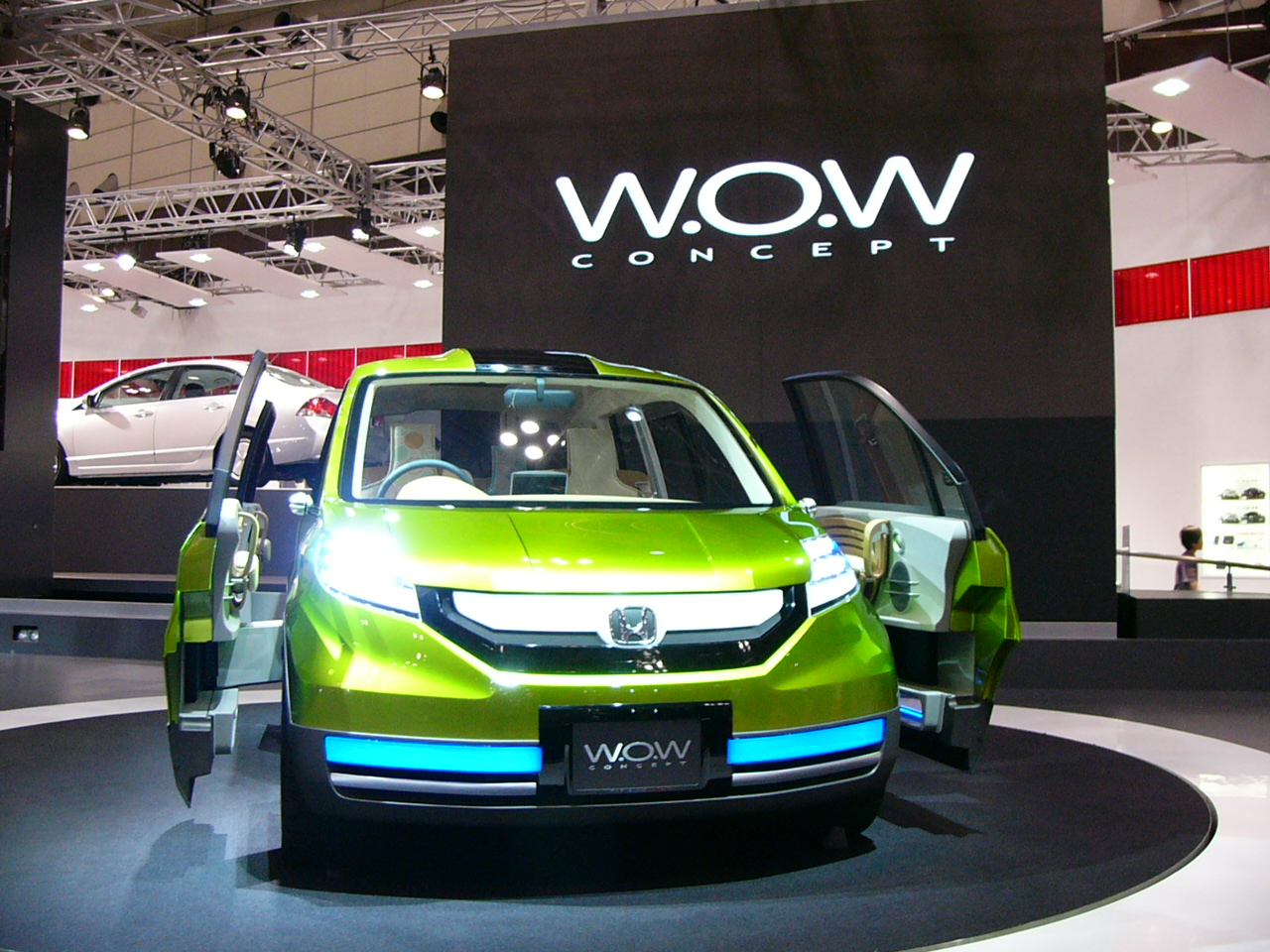

Overview
- Manufacturer: Honda

Body and chassis
- Class: Minivan, concept car
- Body style: 4-door wagon
- Layout: Front-engine, front-wheel-drive
- Doors: Swing and slide

Powertrain
- Engine: 1.0L i-VTEC 4-cylinder

Dimensions
- Length: 157.0 in (3,988 mm)

Chronology
- Successor: Honda Freed

The Honda WOW ("Wonderful Open-hearted Wagon") was a concept car created by the automobile division of Honda, first introduced at the 2005 Tokyo Motor Show. The WOW was designed to fit the needs of both a person and dogs.

The WOW concept was built with a low center of gravity, giving it a more stable driving experience. This low center of gravity, along with the addition of wood-paneled floors, aimed to make dogs to feel more comfortable in the WOW. It also sported a state-of-the-art instrument panel featuring a lid that revealed a crate to carry smaller dogs. It also included average ventilation and a center walk-through, allowing dogs to walk around the car.

The Design Cues have been continued in the Honda Freed, which came out in 2008.
