= Honda S-MX =

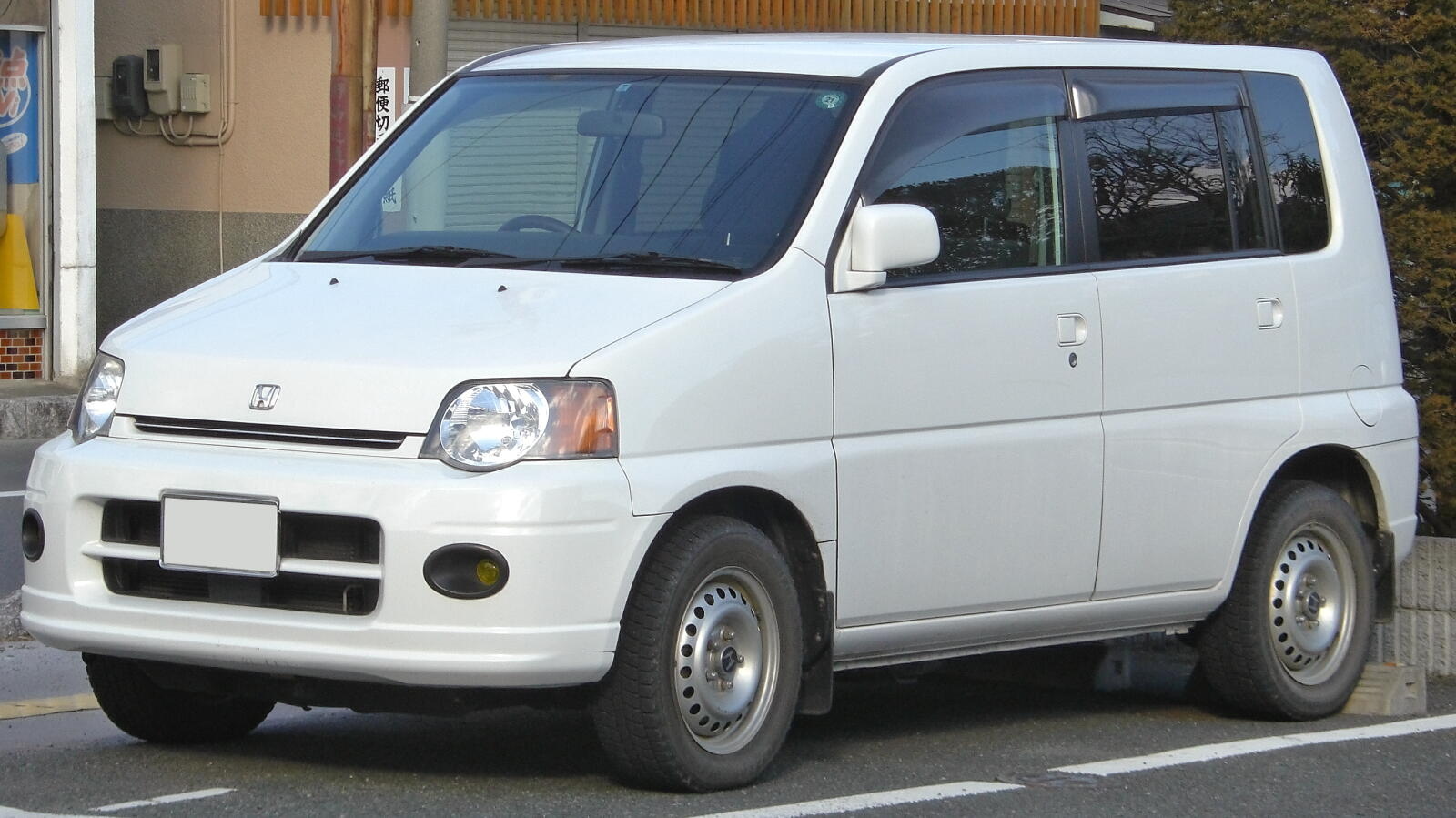

Overview
- Manufacturer: Honda
- Model code: RH1/2
- Production: 1996–2002

Body and chassis
- Class: Compact MPV
- Body style: 3+1-door hatchback
- Layout: Front-engine, front-wheel-drive Front engine, four-wheel-drive
- Related: Honda StepWGN (first generation)

Powertrain
- Engine: 1972 cc B20B DOHC I4
- Transmission: 4-speed automatic

Dimensions
- Wheelbase: 2,500 mm (98.4 in)
- Length: 3,950 mm (155.5 in)
- Width: 1,695 mm (66.7 in)
- Height: 1,750 mm (68.9 in); 1,765 mm (69.5 in) (4WD); 1,735 mm (68.3 in) (Lowdown)
- Curb weight: 1,390 kg (3,060 lb)

Chronology
- Successor: Honda Mobilio Spike; Honda Edix

The Honda S-MX (Japanese: ホンダ・S-MX) is a compact MPV produced by Honda, sold between 1996 and 2002.

== Design ==
The S-MX was based on the S-MX Concept model first exhibited at the 31st Tokyo Motor Show in 1995, and was similar in appearance to the larger Honda Stepwgn, shortened substantially in length and height. Whereas the Stepwgn had three rows of seating to accommodate eight passengers the smaller S-MX has two rows of seating for four or five passengers. In order to maximize space for passengers the S-MX uses a front bench seat and a column shifter for the four-speed automatic transmission (the only available transmission).

The S-MX was powered by a 1,972 cc (2.0 L) version of Honda's B-series engine featuring double overhead camshafts and four valves per cylinder; it did not use Honda's VTEC system. Peak power output was 130 PS (96 kW) at 5,500 rpm and peak torque was 18.7 kg⋅m (183 N⋅m; 135 lb⋅ft) at 4,200 rpm. This engine was shared with the Honda CR-V and Honda Stepwgn. Similar to the CR-V and Stepwgn, the S-MX was available with front-wheel-drive or optional four-wheel-drive. As part of a September 1999 facelift, the engine was upgraded to produce 140 PS (103 kW) and 19.0 kg⋅m (186 N⋅m; 137 lb⋅ft) at the same engine speeds.

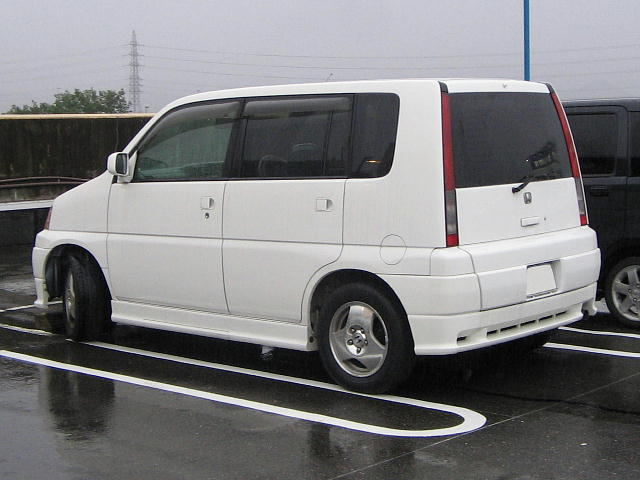
Rear view of a Lowdown edition

As was customary of minivans of the time the S-MX features only one (conventional) rear door on the passenger (left) side of the vehicle. Ostensibly this feature was for the safety of passengers, to prevent them from stepping out into traffic. All chassis codes start with RH1 for the Base model and Lowdown (Lowdown is also printed on the chassis plate). All 4WD models have chassis codes starting with RH2.

== Overview ==
The S-MX went on sale on November 22, 1996, as the fourth product of 'Creative Mover' series, which were Honda's automobiles with the aim of 'Lifestyle Enhancing Vehicles' that expand the users' lifestyles with more fun and richness.

The vehicle was available in three different trims:

- Base trim with front-wheel-drive
- 4WD, which featured four-wheel-drive, a 15 mm higher ride height and added gear selections for the transmission
- Lowdown, which featured a 15 mm lower ride height compared to the base model, a front chin spoiler, a rear spoiler, side skirts and unique 3-spoke 15-inch wheels

The S-MX came in a plethora of color options: Supersonic Blue Pearl, Taffeta White, Nighthawk Black Pearl, Ruby Red Pearl, Tropic Jade Pearl, Satin Silver Metallic, Lightning Silver Metallic, Tahitian Green Pearl, and Passion Orange Metallic.

=== Optional Extras ===
- Sunroof
- Rear Spoiler (Lowdown only)
- ABS Braking system
- Orange Interior Seats, Speaker Grills, Air-Vents, Door Handles (Lowdown only)
- Clear Indicators
- Wind Deflectors
- Floor Mats
- Rear Headrests
- Chrome Door Mirror Covers
- Remote Central Locking
- Mudflaps
- Parking Assistance Pole
- Front Fog Lights
- Electric Folding Mirrors
- Rear Tinted Windows
- Wood Effect Dashboard

== Facelift ==
The S-MX was slightly restyled in September 1999. Another minor change took place in December the following year. The late 2000 change also introduced a new trim, Custom Basic with a front bench seat. This new trim was lower-priced and eliminated several of the once-standard features such as a CD player, electric mirrors and tinted rear windows for privacy. Improvements were made to the styling with re-modeled headlights and front bumper.

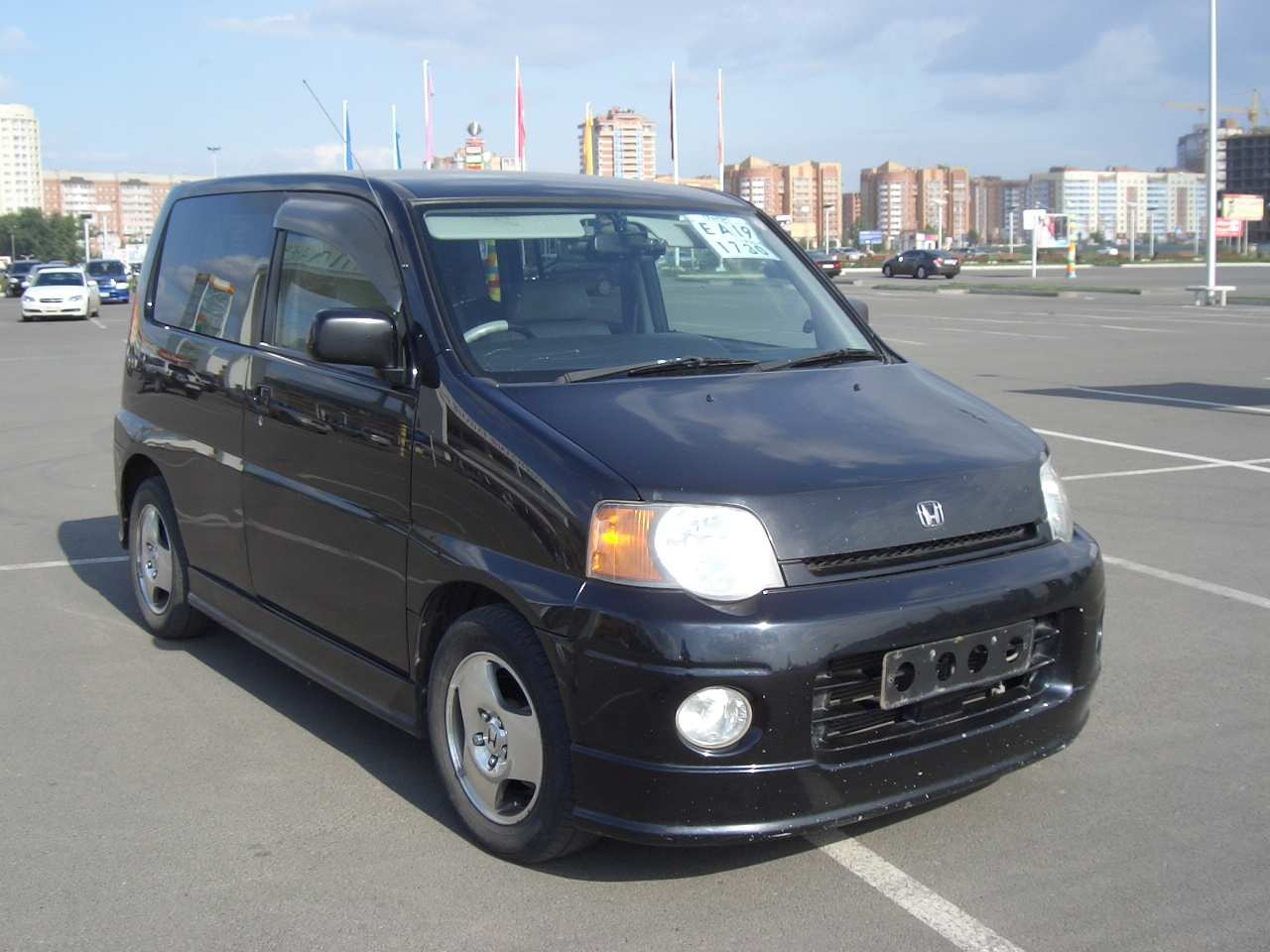
Honda S-MX facelift

=== Changes in 1999 ===
- Body colored bumpers
- Overdrive Gearbox
- Improved B20 Engine (140 PS)
- Black plastic interior panels
- Orange Lowdown upgrades now replaced with red.
- 4 and 5 seater option on Lowdown and 4WD models

=== Optional Extras ===
- Blue seat coverings (Base/4WD)
- Grey with red dots, Grey Hatched Seat coverings (Lowdown)
- Satellite Navigation
- Electric Folding Mirrors
- Remote Central Locking
- Rear Tinted Windows
- Sunroof
- Roof Spoiler
- Climate Control
- Fog Lights
- Armrest (5 Seater Only)
- 3 Spoke Steering Wheel
- Red Carpet (Lowdown)
- Wood Effect Dashboard
- Exhaust Trim

=== Special Editions ===
Two special editions were introduced:

Aero Style - This included: More aggressive front lip, rear lip, spoiler and side skirts. larger alloy wheels, silver dashboard trim and leather interior.

Casual Style - This included: Wooden effect dashboard, black seats, different alloy wheels

== Discontinuation ==
Production of the S-MX ended in 2002, and the vehicle was replaced by the Honda Mobilio Spike at the same time. Many used examples were exported to other countries, with the UK, Australia, New Zealand and Canada being the most popular destinations.
