= Honda e:N2 =

Battery electric compact crossover SUV by Honda

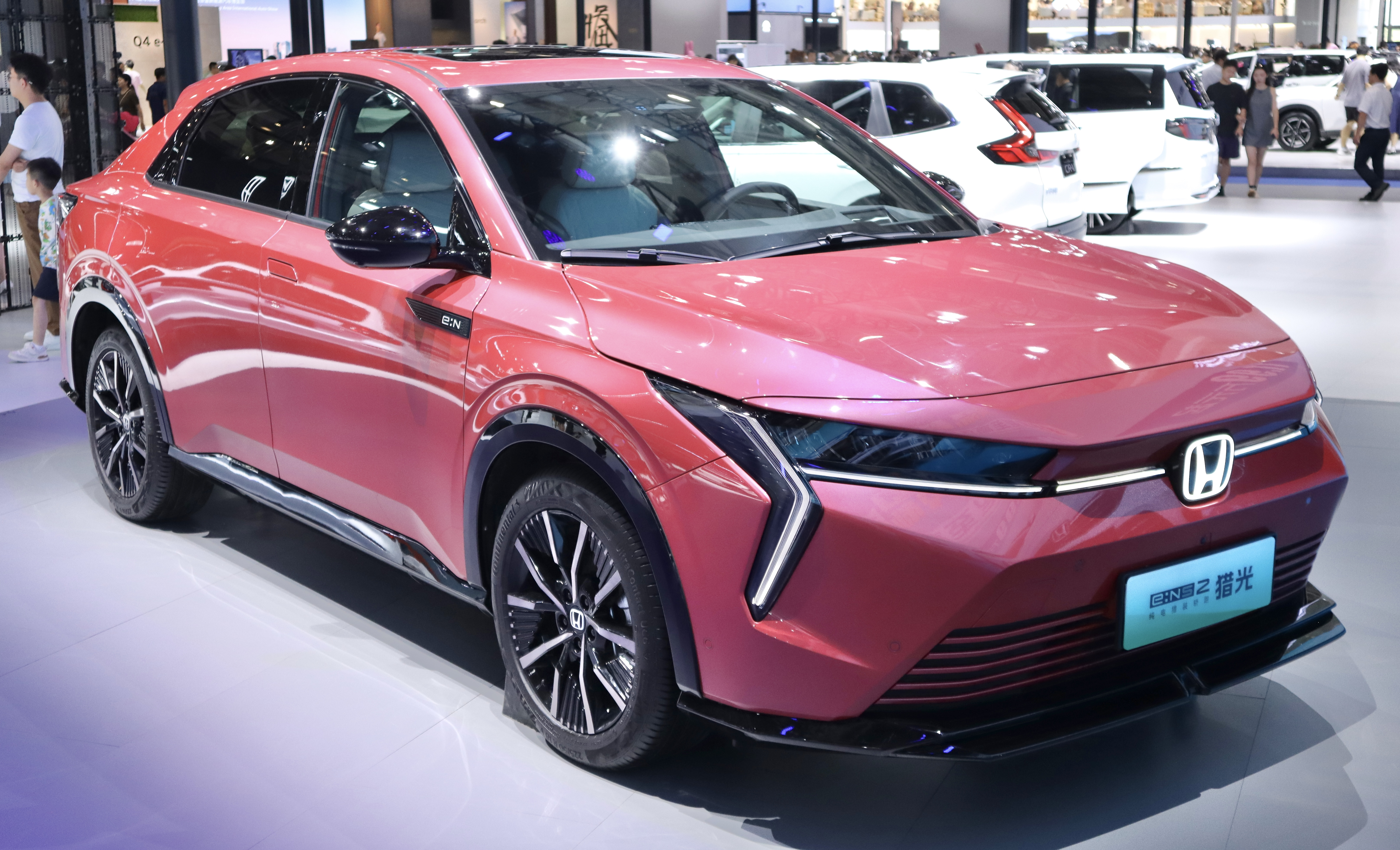
- Honda e:NS2

Overview
- Manufacturer: Honda
- Model code: RM7
- Also called: Honda e:NS2 (China, 2024–present); Honda e:NP2 (China, 2024–2026); Honda Insight (Japan, 2026–present)
- Production: 2024–present
- Assembly: China: Guangzhou (GAC Honda, e:NP2); China: Wuhan (Dongfeng Honda, e:NS2)

Body and chassis
- Class: Compact crossover SUV (C)
- Body style: 5-door SUV
- Layout: Front-motor, front-wheel-drive
- Platform: Honda e:N Architecture F
- Related: Honda e:NP1/e:NS1/e:Ny1/e:N1

Powertrain
- Electric motor: MCF62 permanent magnet synchronous motor
- Power output: 150 kW (204 PS; 201 hp)
- Battery: 68.8 kWh ternary lithium battery
- Electric range: 545 km (339 mi) (CLTC); 530 km (329 mi) (NEDC)

Dimensions
- Wheelbase: 2,735 mm (107.7 in)
- Length: 4,787 mm (188.5 in)
- Width: 1,838 mm (72.4 in)
- Height: 1,570 mm (61.8 in)
- Curb weight: 1,758 kg (3,876 lb)

The Honda e:N2, also called the Honda Insight in Japan and Honda e:NP2 / e:NS2 in China, are battery electric compact crossover SUVs produced since 2024 by GAC Honda and Dongfeng Honda, which are joint ventures of Honda in China. The e:NP2 went on sale in April 2024, while the e:NS2 followed in June 2024.

== Overview ==
The e:NP2 and e:NS2 were previewed several times prior to its introduction. In November 2022, the models are previewed as a single concept car, the Honda e:N2 Concept. In April 2023 at the Auto Shanghai, the models are previewed again as two concept vehicles named the Honda e:NP2 Prototype and Honda e:NS2 Prototype. In November 2023 at the Auto Guangzhou, both vehicles appeared as production-ready vehicles. The e:NP2, with a Chinese name (Chinese: 极湃2; pinyin: Jí pài 2; lit. 'Extreme Pai 2') went on sale in April 2024 with one trim level available.

The e:NP2 and e:NS2 are the same vehicle with several alterations on the front and rear fascias. Both are based on the e:N Architecture F, a front-wheel drive-based electric vehicle platform by Honda, and come equipped with a 68.8 kWh lithium-ion battery sourced from CATL and a single front-mounted electric motor producing 150 kW (204 PS; 201 hp). Under CLTC standards, the vehicle has an electric range of 545 km (339 mi).

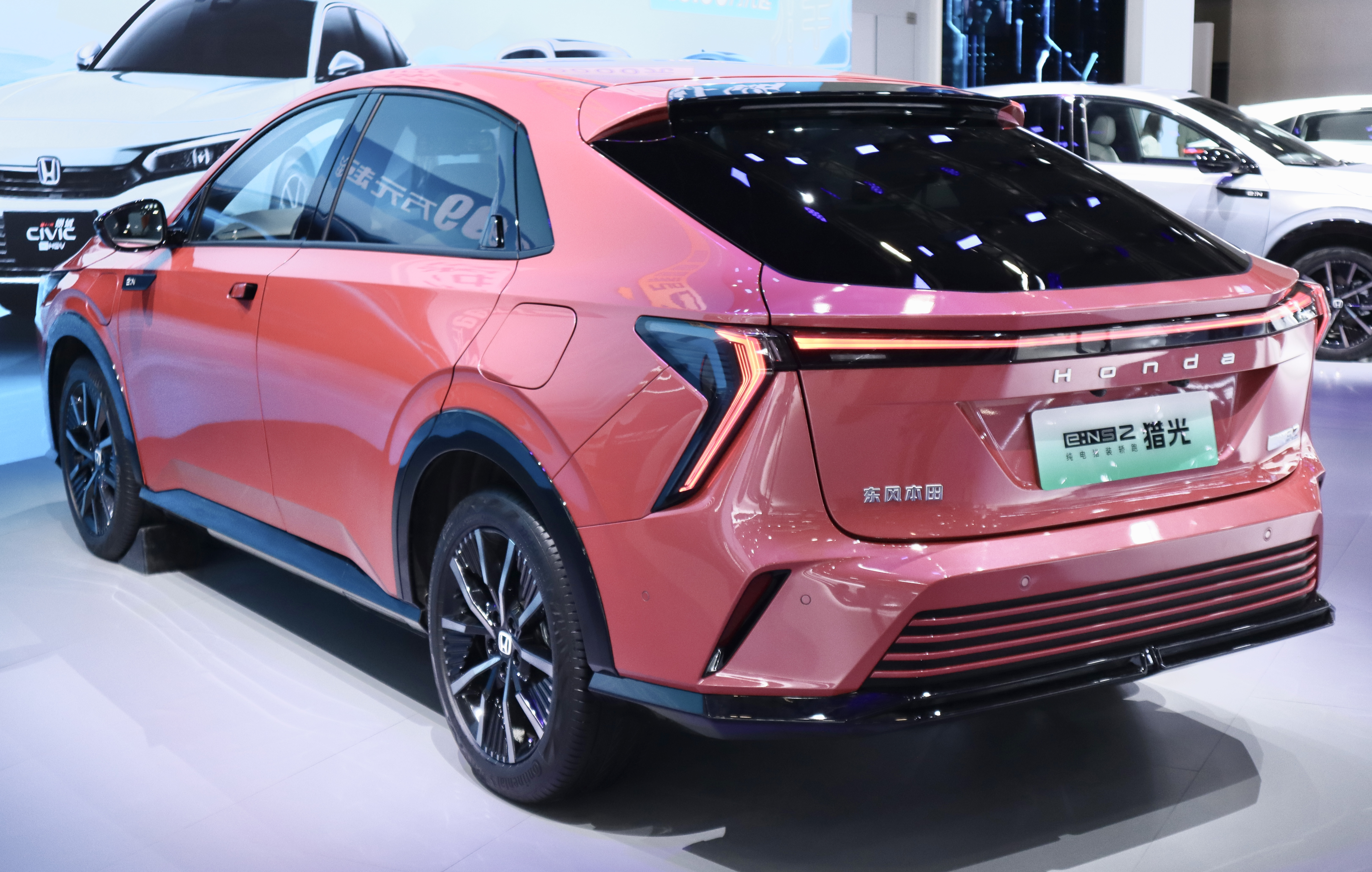
Rear view (e:NS2)

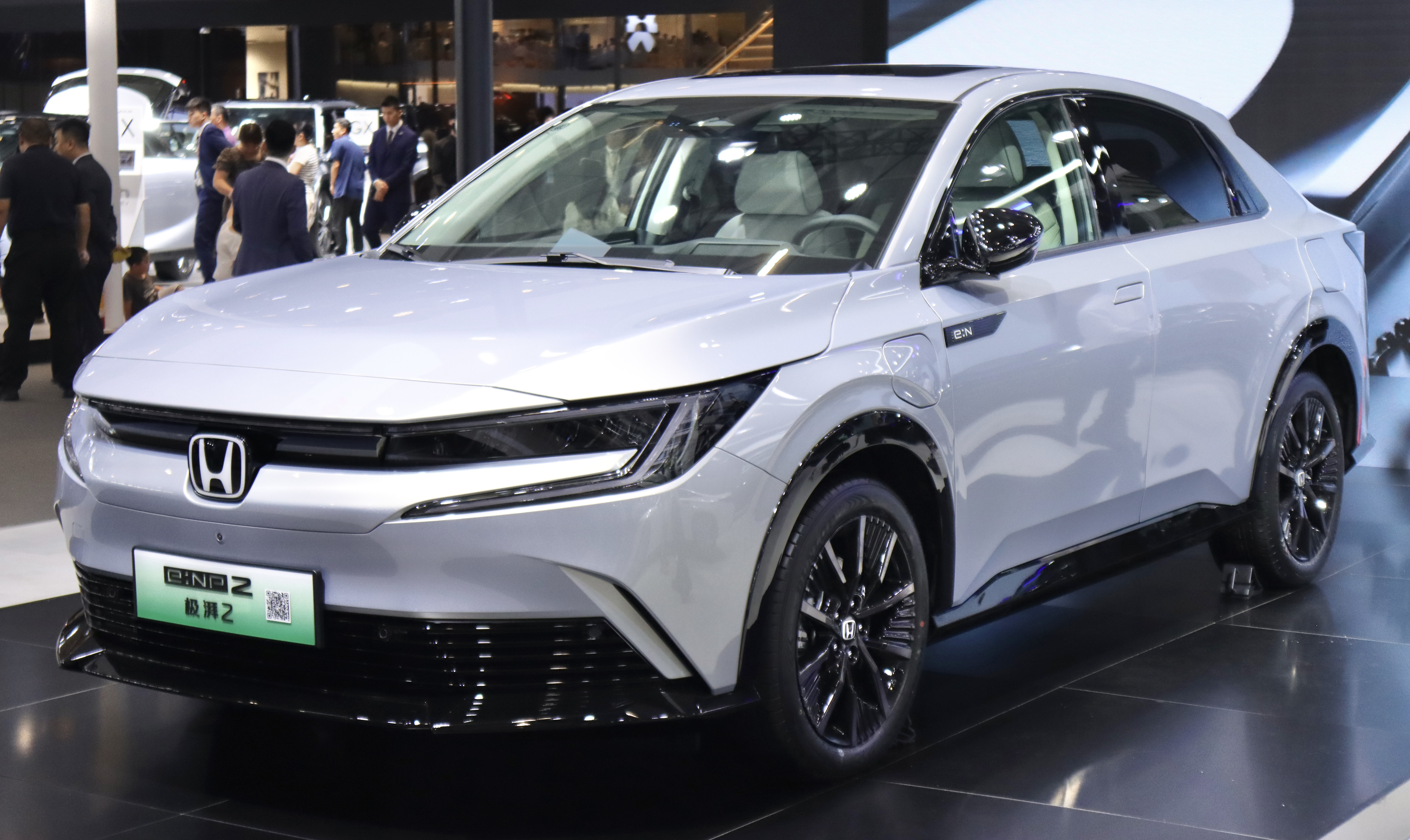
Honda e:NP2

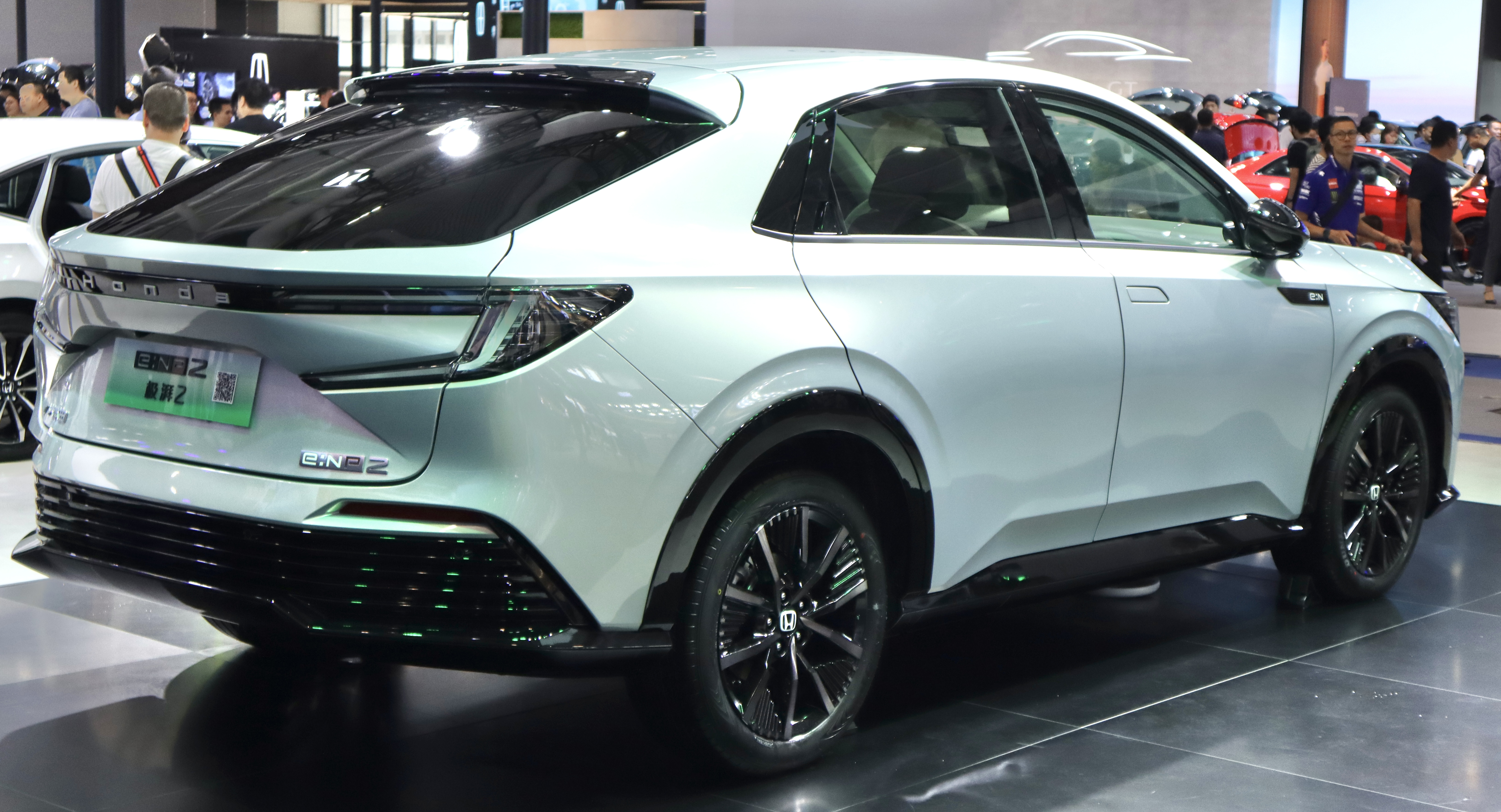
Rear view (e:NP2)

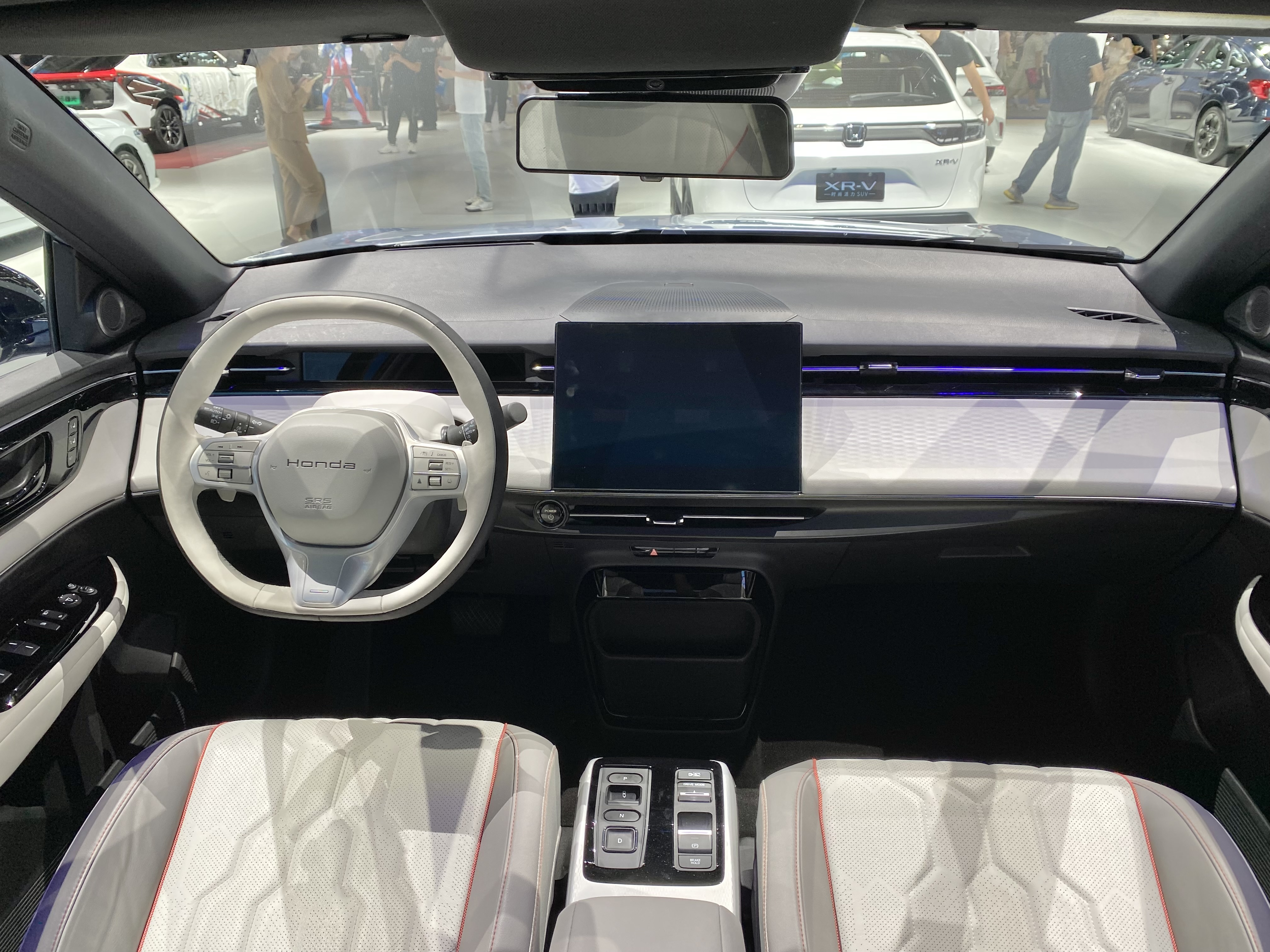
Interior (e:NP2)

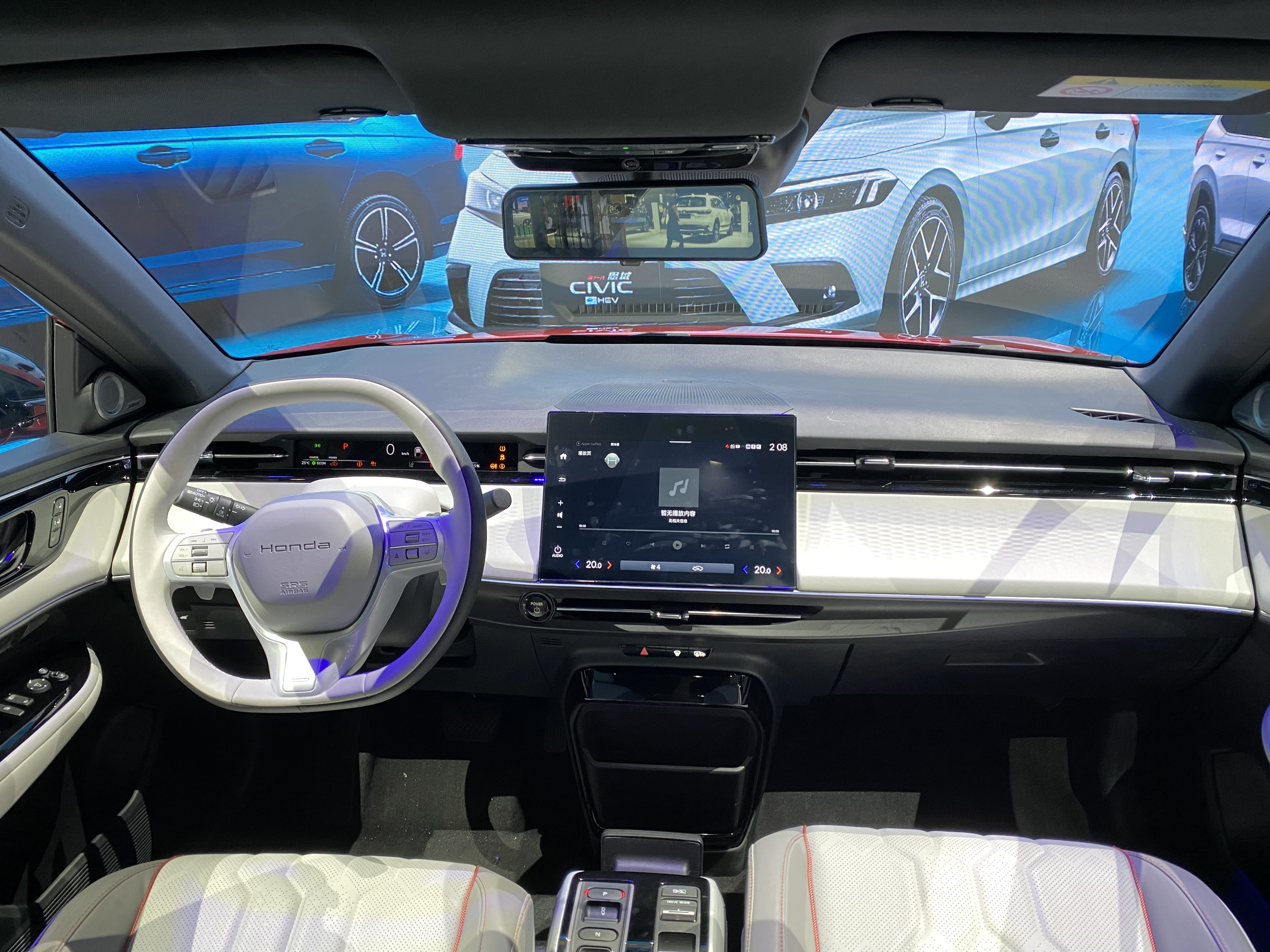
Interior (e:NS2)

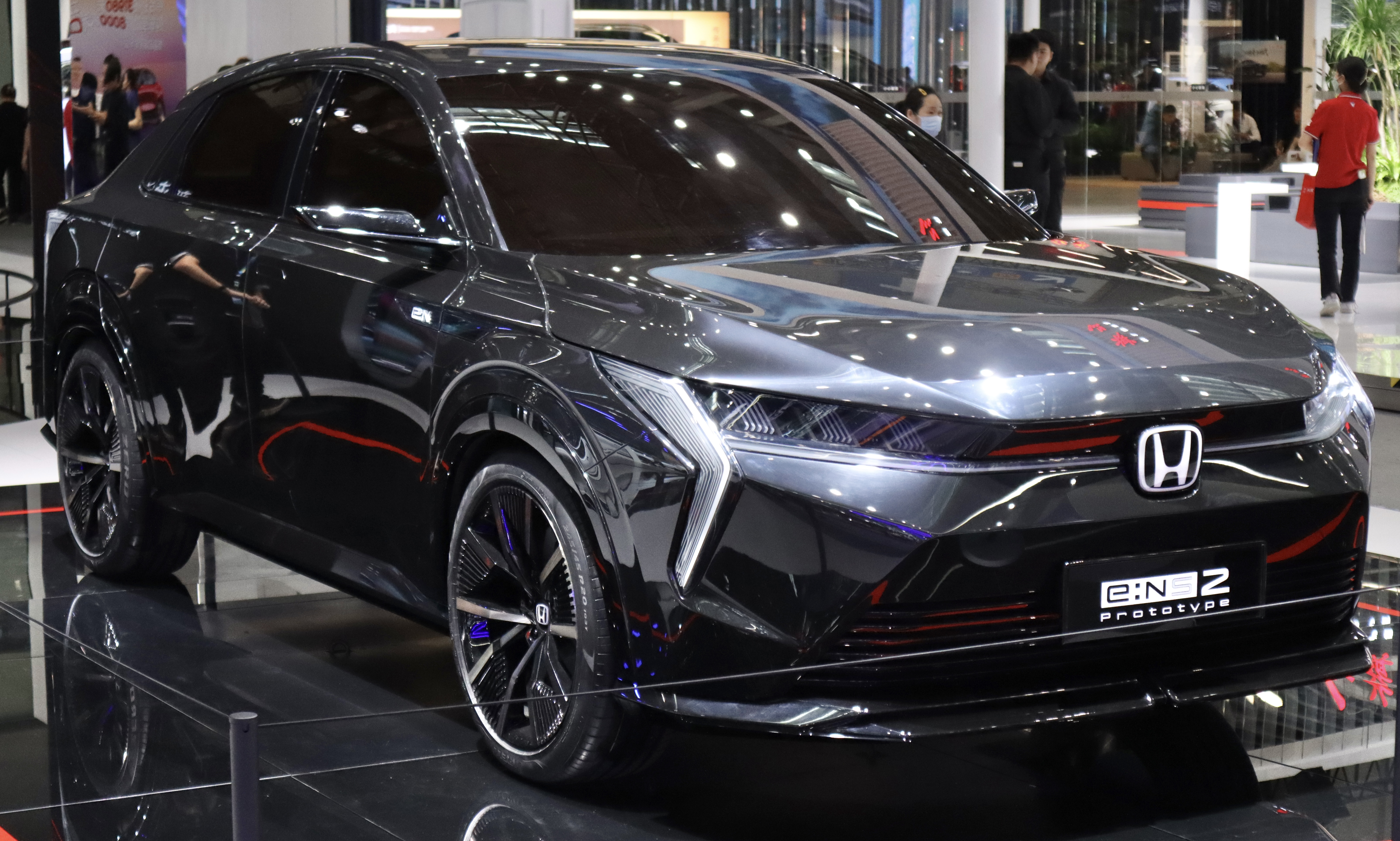
Honda e:NS2 Prototype

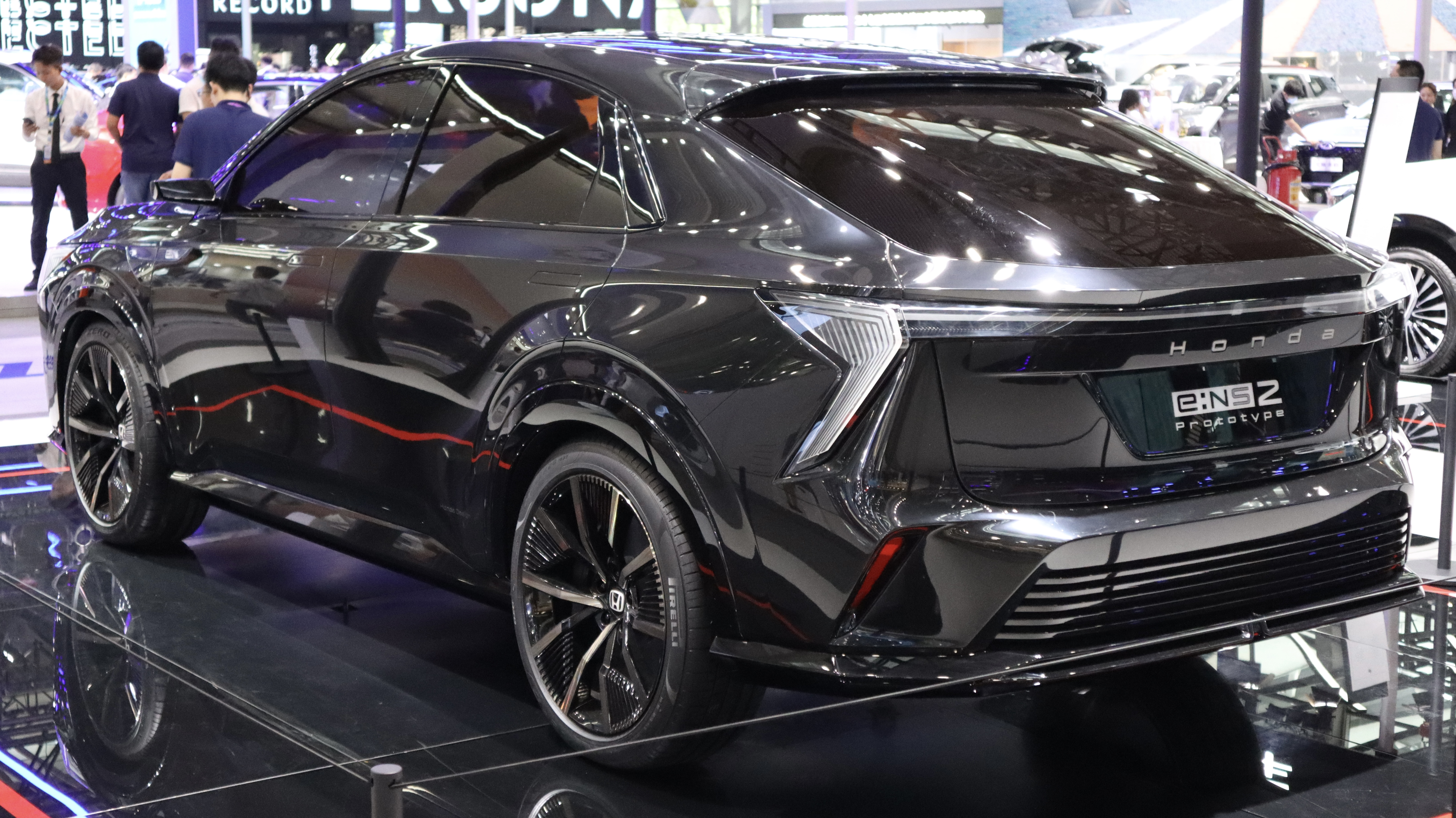
Rear view (e:NS2 Prototype)

== Markets ==
=== Japan ===
The vehicle was introduced in Japan on 17 April 2026 as the Honda Insight. Imported from China, the Insight is marketed in two variants, namely Insight, and Insight Honda ON Limited Edition.

=== Thailand ===
The e:N2 was launched in Thailand on 23 March 2026, in the sole variant fully imported from China.

== Sales ==
Year	China		
Year	e:NP2	e:NS2	Total
2024	2,609	447	3,056
2025	2,434	1,277	3,711
