= Honda HR-V (third generation) =

Third-generation of Honda HR-V

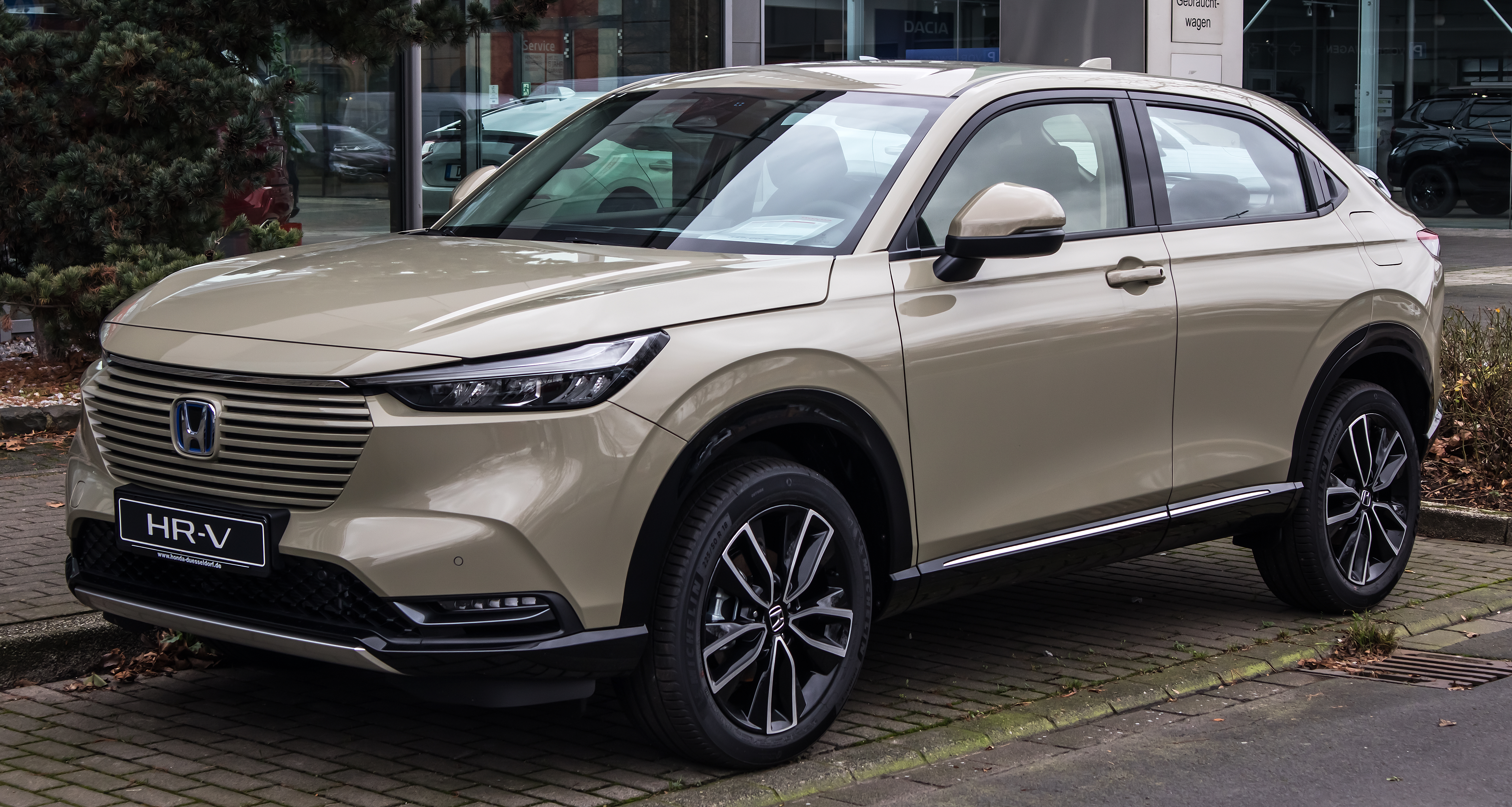
- 2023 Honda HR-V e:HEV Advance (RV5; pre-facelift, Europe)

Overview
- Manufacturer: Honda
- Model code: RV3; RV4; RV5; RV6; RS1 (electric)
- Also called: Honda Vezel; Honda XR-V (China); Honda e:NS1/e:NP1 (China, electric, 2022–2025); Honda e:Ny1 (Europe, electric); Honda e:N1 (Thailand, Hong Kong, Macau and Malaysia, electric)
- Production: April 2021 – present
- Assembly: Japan: Yorii, Saitama; China: Guangzhou (GAC Honda); Wuhan (Dongfeng Honda); Taiwan: Pingtung; Thailand: Ayutthaya; Prachinburi; Indonesia: Karawang (HPM); Malaysia: Alor Gajah, Malacca; Brazil: Itirapina; Pakistan: Lahore (Honda Atlas); Ghana: Tema (Honda Ghana)
- Designer: Daisuke Akojima

Body and chassis
- Class: Subcompact crossover SUV (B)
- Body style: 5-door SUV
- Layout: Front-engine, front-wheel-drive; Front-engine, all-wheel-drive
- Platform: Honda Global Small Car; Honda e:N Architecture F (e:NS1/e:NP1/e:Ny1/e:N1)
- Related: Honda Fit/Jazz/Life (fourth generation); Honda City/Ballade (seventh generation); Honda Freed (third generation); Honda Elevate

Powertrain
- Engine: Petrol: 1.5 L L15B i-VTEC I4 (RV3/4); 1.5 L L15ZF i-VTEC I4; 1.5 L L15C1 VTEC turbo I4; 2.0 L Honda K engine I4 (US); Petrol HEV: 1.5 L LEB-MMD/LEC-H5/LEC6 Atkinson cycle DOHC i-MMD I4 (RV5/6)
- Electric motor: 2x AC PMSM (e:HEV); TZ190HSBMCF61 and TZ190HSAMCF61 permanent magnet synchronous motor (electric versions)
- Power output: 87 kW (118 PS; 117 hp) (L15B); 89 kW (121 PS; 119 hp) (L15ZF); 130 kW (177 PS; 174 hp) (L15C1); 78 kW (106 PS; 105 hp) + 96 kW (131 PS; 129 hp) (LEB-MMD/LEC-H5/LEC6); 134–150 kW (182–204 PS; 180–201 hp) (electric versions)
- Transmission: CVT; e-CVT i-MMD (e:HEV)
- Hybrid drivetrain: Sport Hybrid i-MMD (e:HEV)
- Battery: 53.6–68.8 kWh NMC lithium-ion (electric versions)
- Electric range: 420–510 km (261–317 mi) (CLTC, electric versions)

Dimensions
- Wheelbase: 2,610 mm (102.8 in)
- Length: 4,330–4,385 mm (170.5–172.6 in)
- Width: 1,790 mm (70.5 in)
- Height: 1,580–1,590 mm (62.2–62.6 in)
- Curb weight: 1,250–1,450 kg (2,755.8–3,196.7 lb)

Chronology
- Predecessor: Honda HR-V (second generation)

The third-generation Honda HR-V is a subcompact crossover SUV (B-segment) manufactured by Honda since 2021, replacing the second-generation HR-V, and is split into two different models for different markets.

The global model (with "RV" model code) was first introduced in February 2021, based on the Honda Global Small Car platform sharing its platform with the fourth-generation Fit/Jazz/Life and the seventh-generation City/Ballade. The battery electric version (with "RS1" model code) was introduced in October 2021 and based on the Honda e:N Architecture F platform.

The North American market received a different and larger model (with "RZ" model code) which is claimed to "meet the distinct needs of U.S. customers", and is sold outside North America as the Honda ZR-V, is based on the Honda Architecture (HA) platform shared with the eleventh-generation Civic.

== Global version (RV/RS1; 2021) ==
=== Overview ===
The second-generation Vezel/third-generation HR-V for markets outside of North America was unveiled in Japan on 18 February 2021. Sales began in Japan on 22 April 2021, with the European-spec HR-V was detailed on the same day.

The exterior of the HR-V is an evolution of the previous model with trademark styling elements such as the coupé-like shape and hidden rear door handles. Compared to the previous model, the HR-V features smoother styling reminiscent of Honda's other models such as the Civic (eleventh generation), the roofline was made more coupé-like by increasing the rear windscreen rake, and the characteristic upwards side slash of the previous model was replaced by a straight line connecting the headlights and taillights. The front fascia features multi-slat horizontal grille in body colour and the LED headlights are joined together with a chrome strip, while the rear fascia features a full-width LED taillight bar. The e:HEV hybrid model features blue accents inside the Honda logos.

Inside, the dashboard has a horizontal theme and a full-width air vent design with corner outlets which can be adjusted to diffuse the airflow. There is a 7-inch semi-digital instrument cluster, a 9-inch touchscreen infotainment system supporting Android Auto and Apple CarPlay, 9-speaker sound system, Honda Connect connected services, Honda Digital Key with smartphone function, in-car Wi-Fi hotspot a first feature for a Honda vehicle, a new steering wheel design inspired from the Honda e, a panoramic glass roof and a wireless charging pad.

According to specifications issued for the Australian market, the boot capacity is smaller than its predecessor, measuring 304 litres (10.7 cu ft) with the rear seats in place and 1,274 litres (45.0 cu ft) with the rear seats folded using the VDA measurement, down from 437 litres (15.4 cu ft) and 1,462 litres (51.6 cu ft) respectively. Like the previous model, the HR-V comes standard with the Magic Seats which features multiple seating arrangements, and for the first time the HR-V is available with a hands-free powered tailgate.

For safety, the HR-V is available with the Honda Sensing driver-assistance safety features. For the first time, the HR-V is available with blind spot monitoring and a multi-view reversing camera.

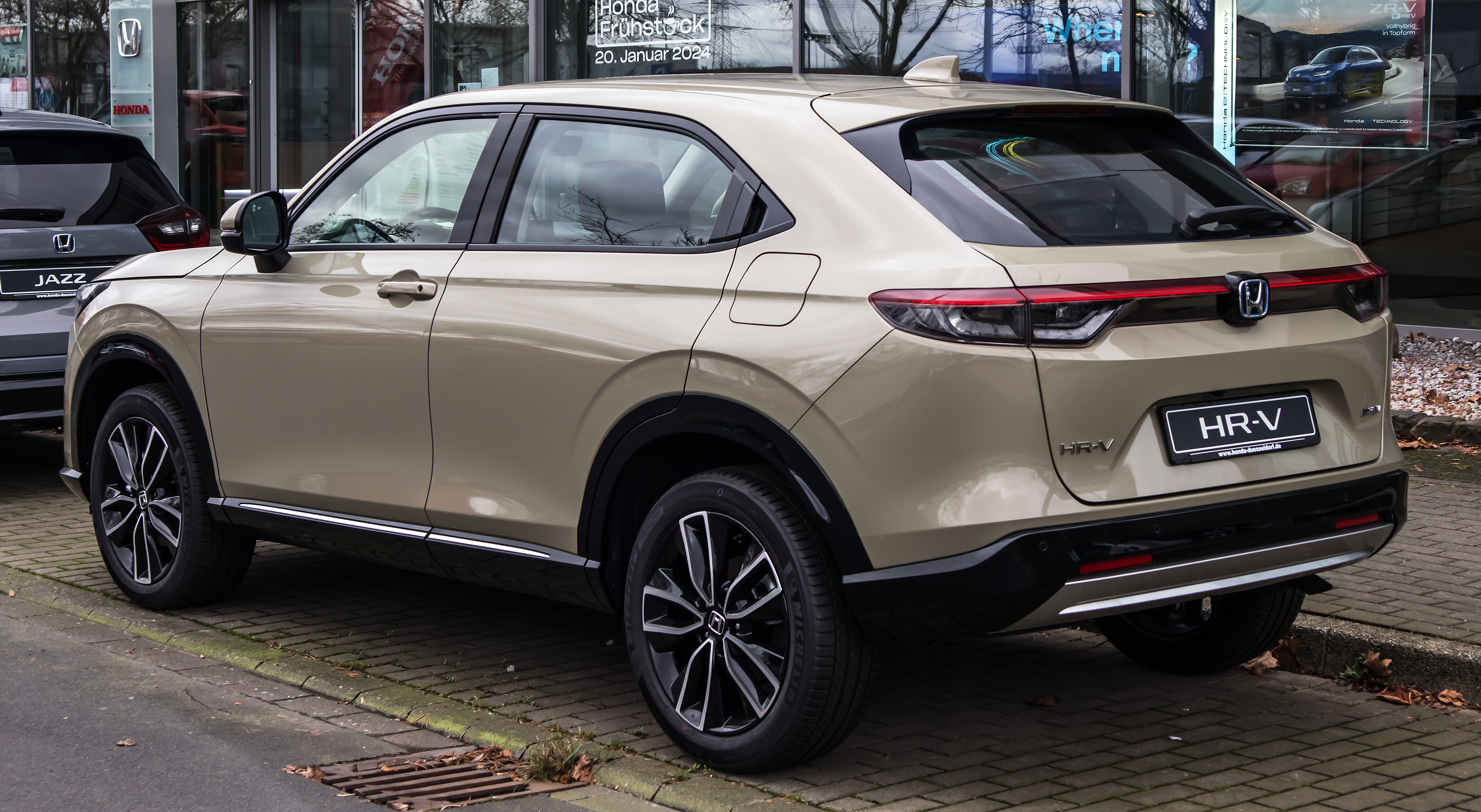
Rear view (RV5; pre-facelift, Europe)

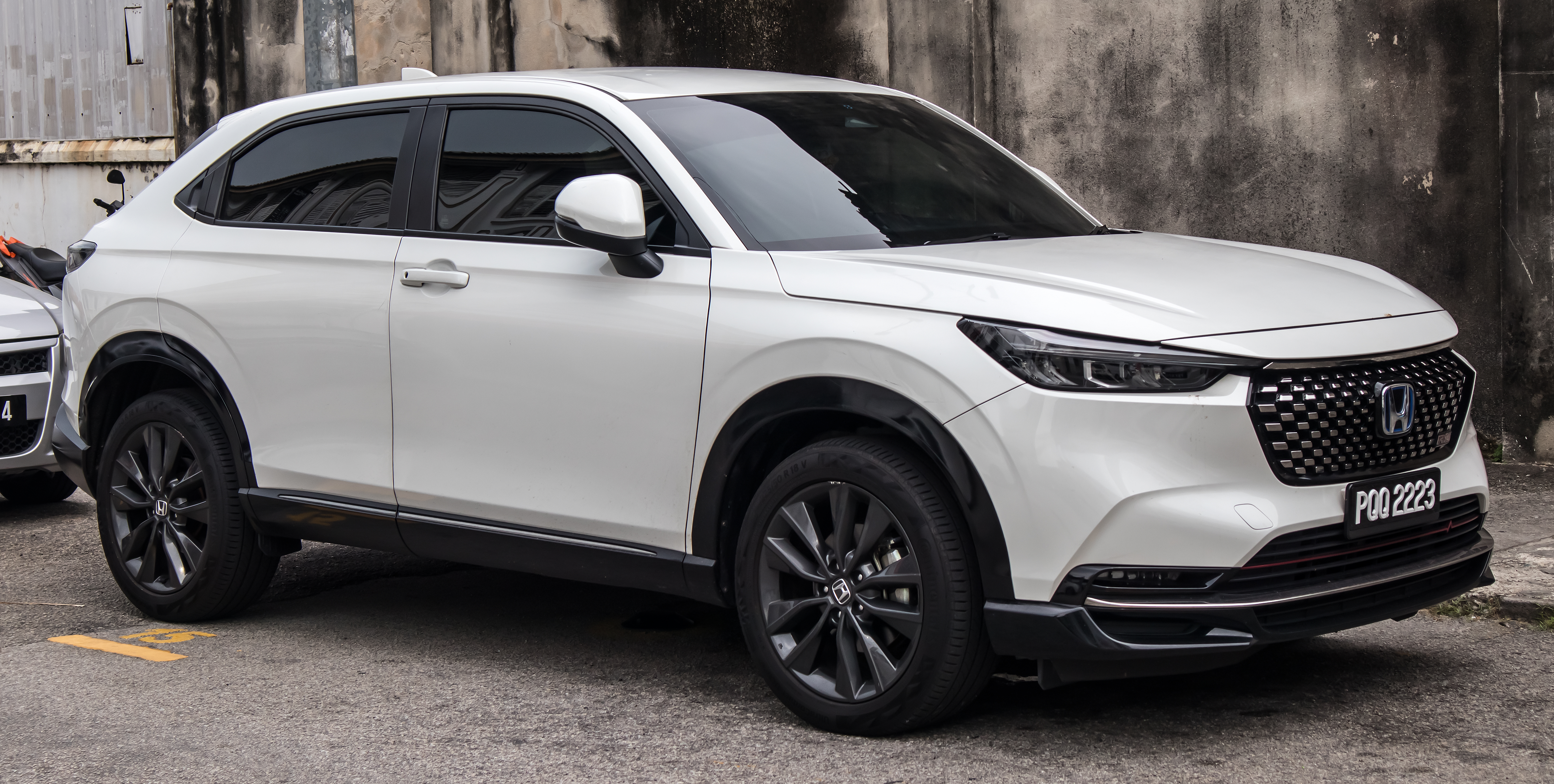
Honda HR-V e:HEV RS (RV5; pre-facelift, Malaysia)

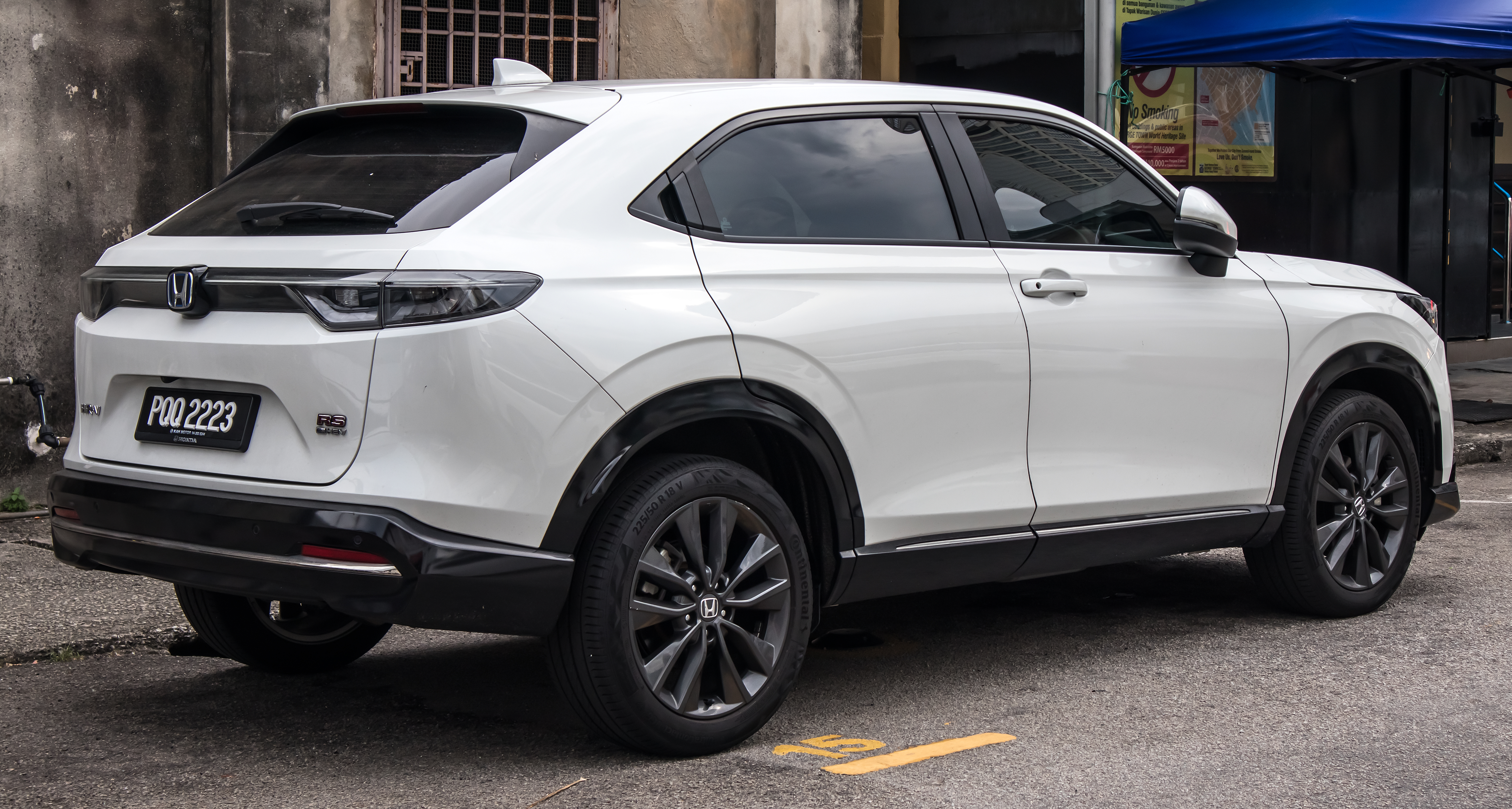
Rear view (RS; pre-facelift, Malaysia)

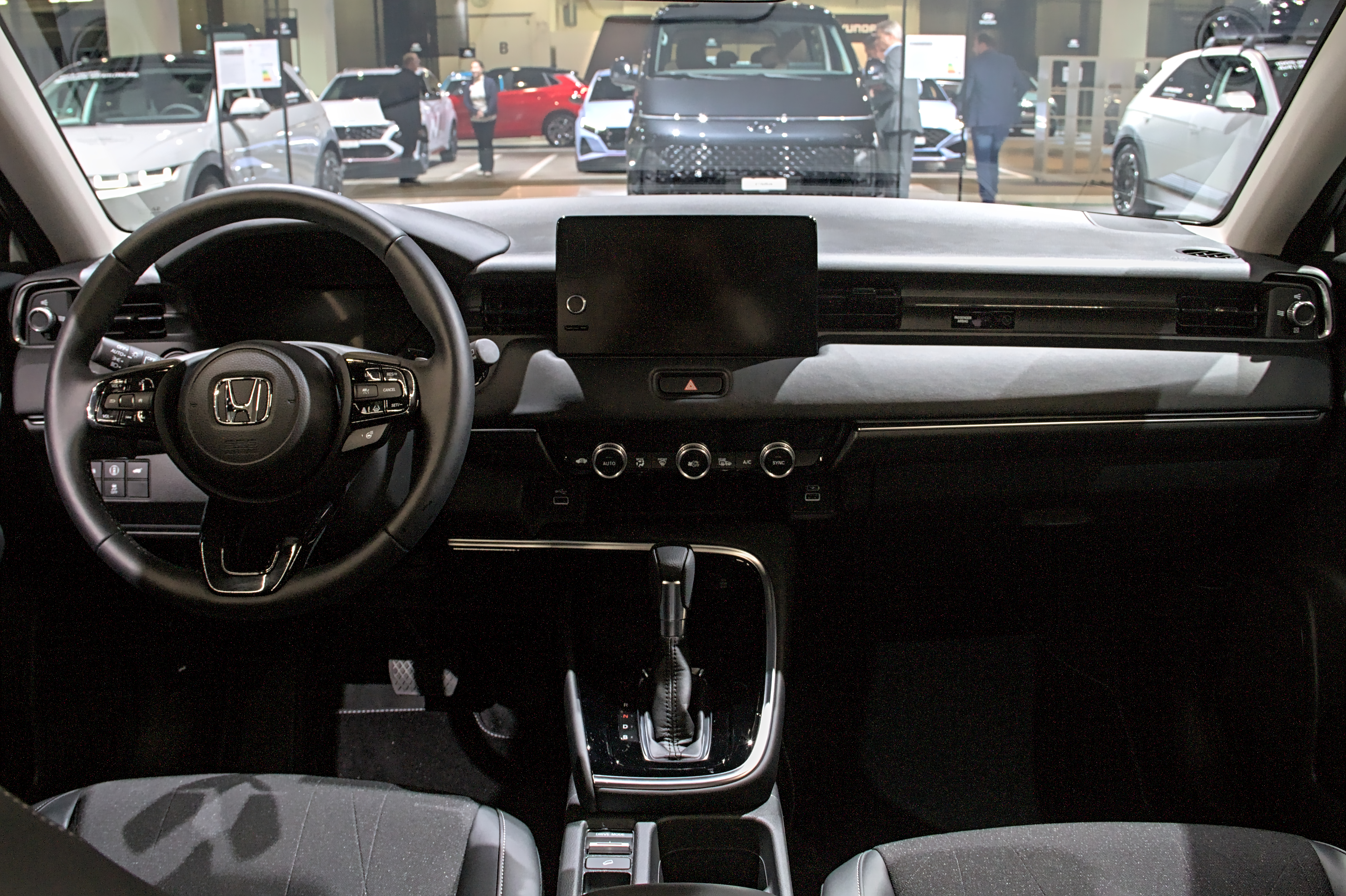
Interior (pre-facelift, Europe)

==== Facelift ====
The facelifted model was unveiled on 14 March 2024. Changes include an updated front fascia design and new LED graphics for the rear taillights, new exterior colours, the interior received minor changes, the e:HEV model received an updated energy management control and new safety features included in the Honda Sensing safety system.

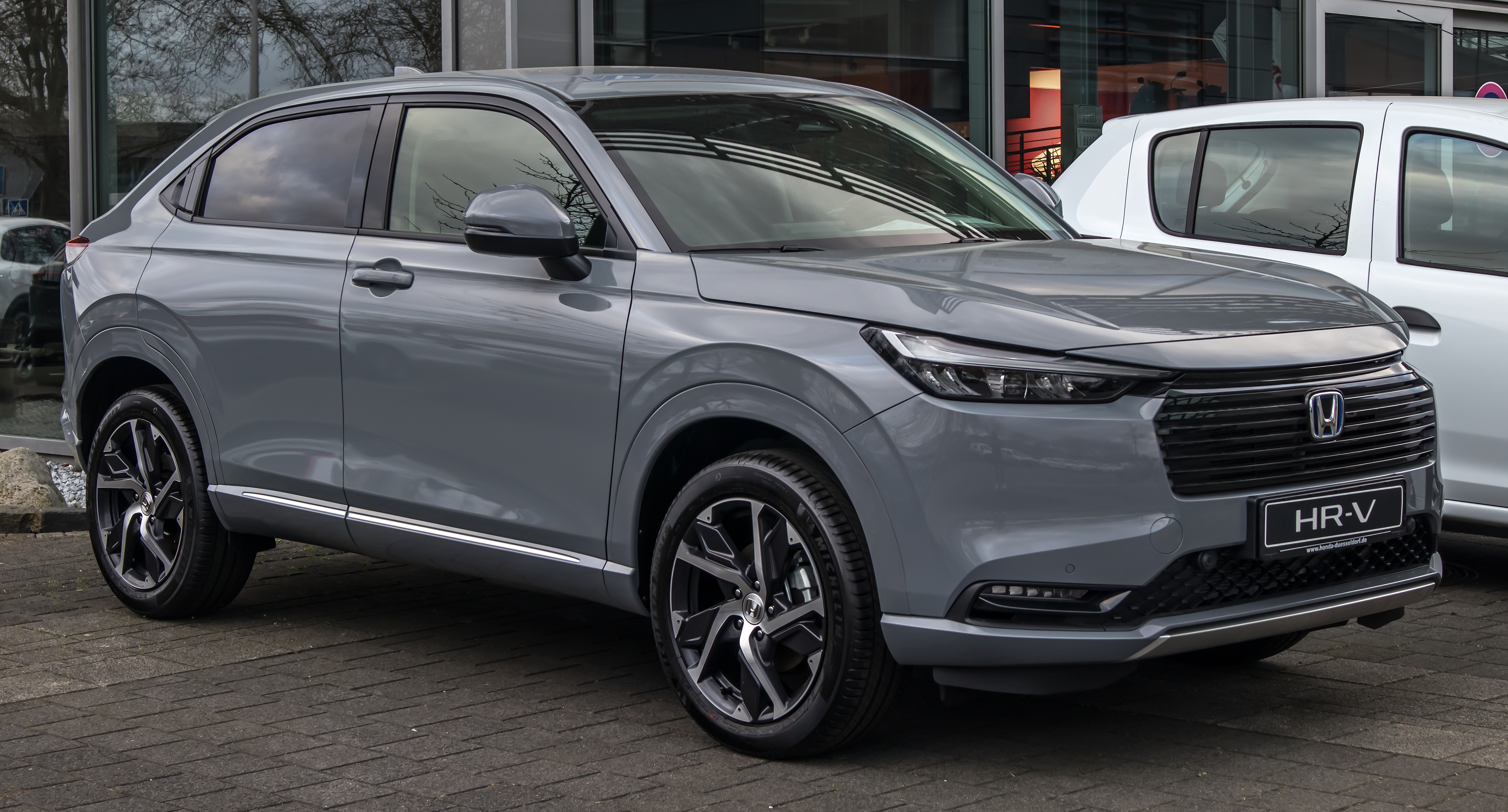
2025 HR-V e:HEV Advance Plus (RV5; facelift, Europe)

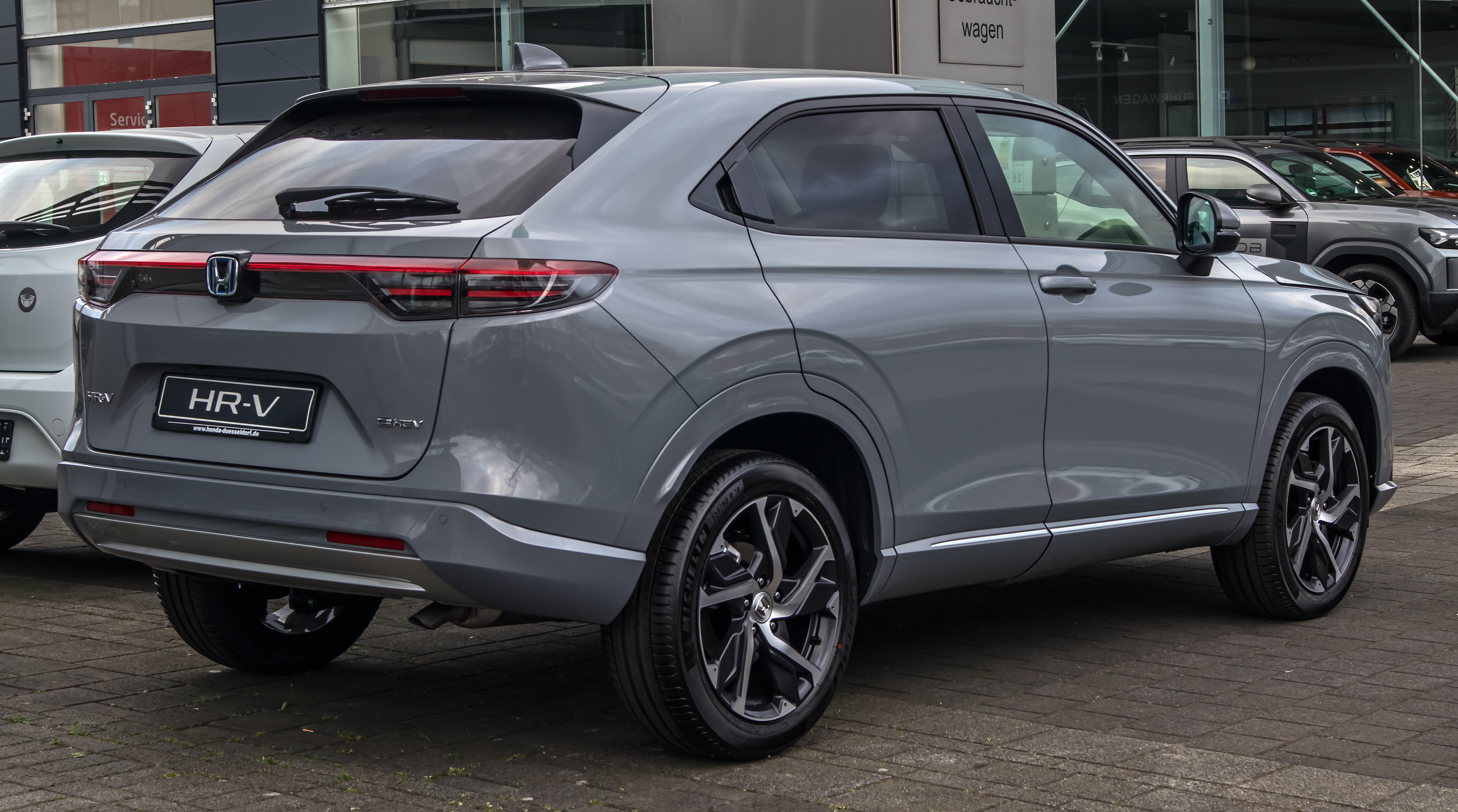
Rear view (facelift, Europe)

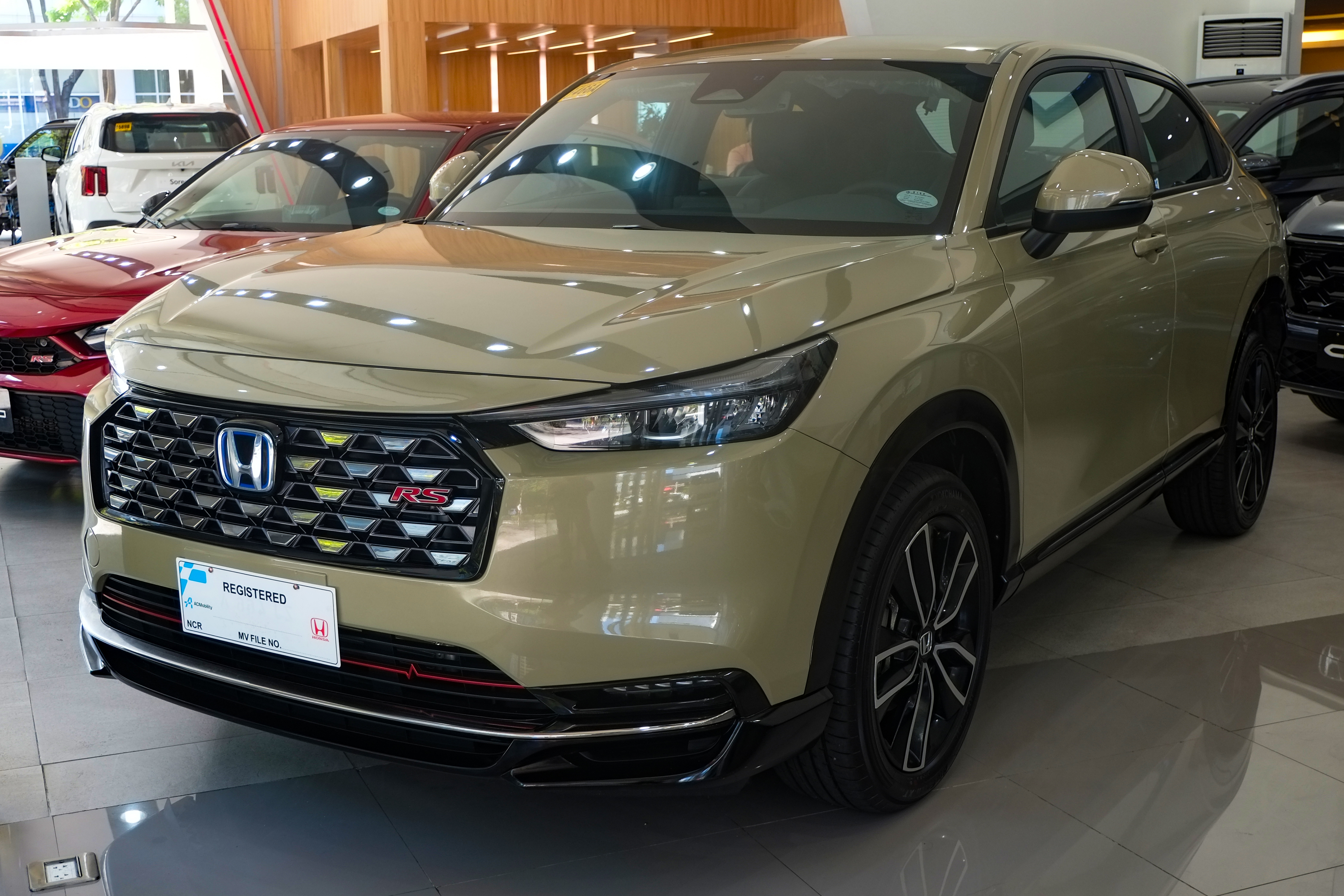
2025 HR-V e:HEV RS (RV5; facelift, Philippines)

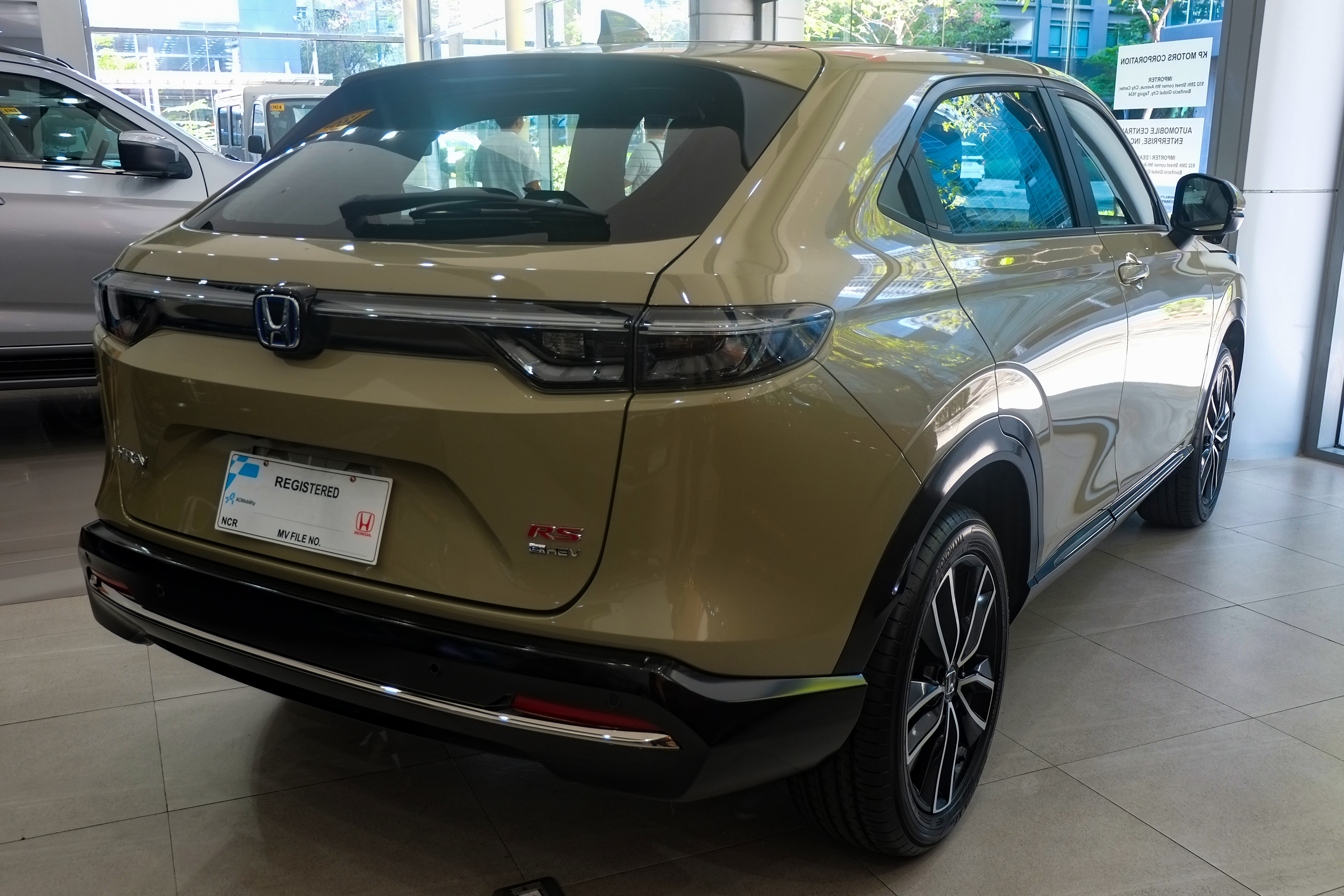
Rear view (RS; facelift)

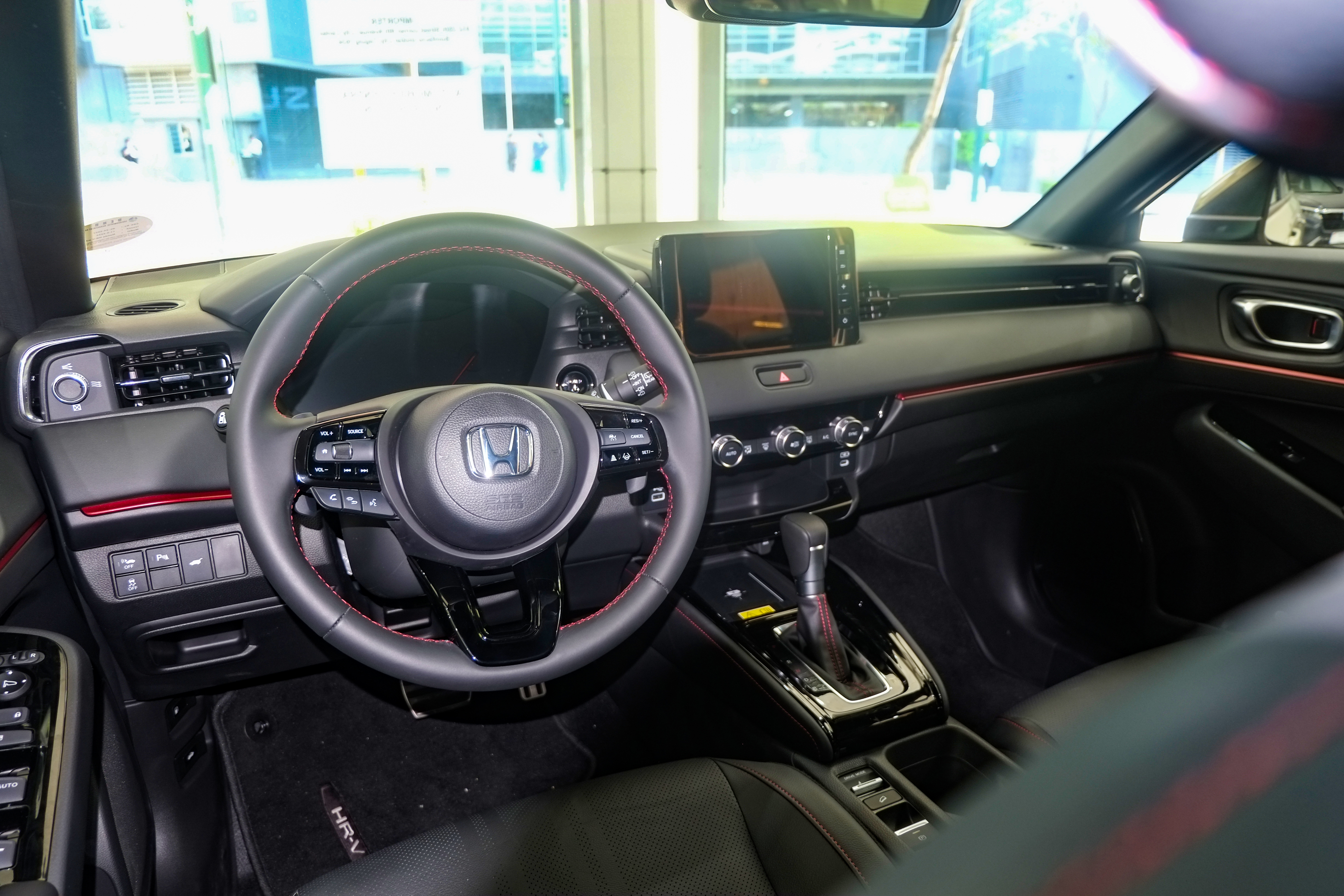
Interior (RS; facelift)

=== Battery electric model ===
A battery electric version of the third-generation HR-V was revealed in China in October 2021 as the Honda e:NS1 and e:NP1, which is manufactured by Dongfeng Honda and Guangqi Honda respectively. Both are based on the e:N Architecture F platform used for smaller, front-wheel drive battery electric vehicles.

The same model is marketed in Europe as the Honda e:Ny1. Sourced from China, the e:Ny1 went on sale in the UK in August 2023 with two trim levels available, Elegance and Advance. It was also marketed in Hong Kong, Indonesia, Malaysia, New Zealand and Thailand as the Honda e:N1.

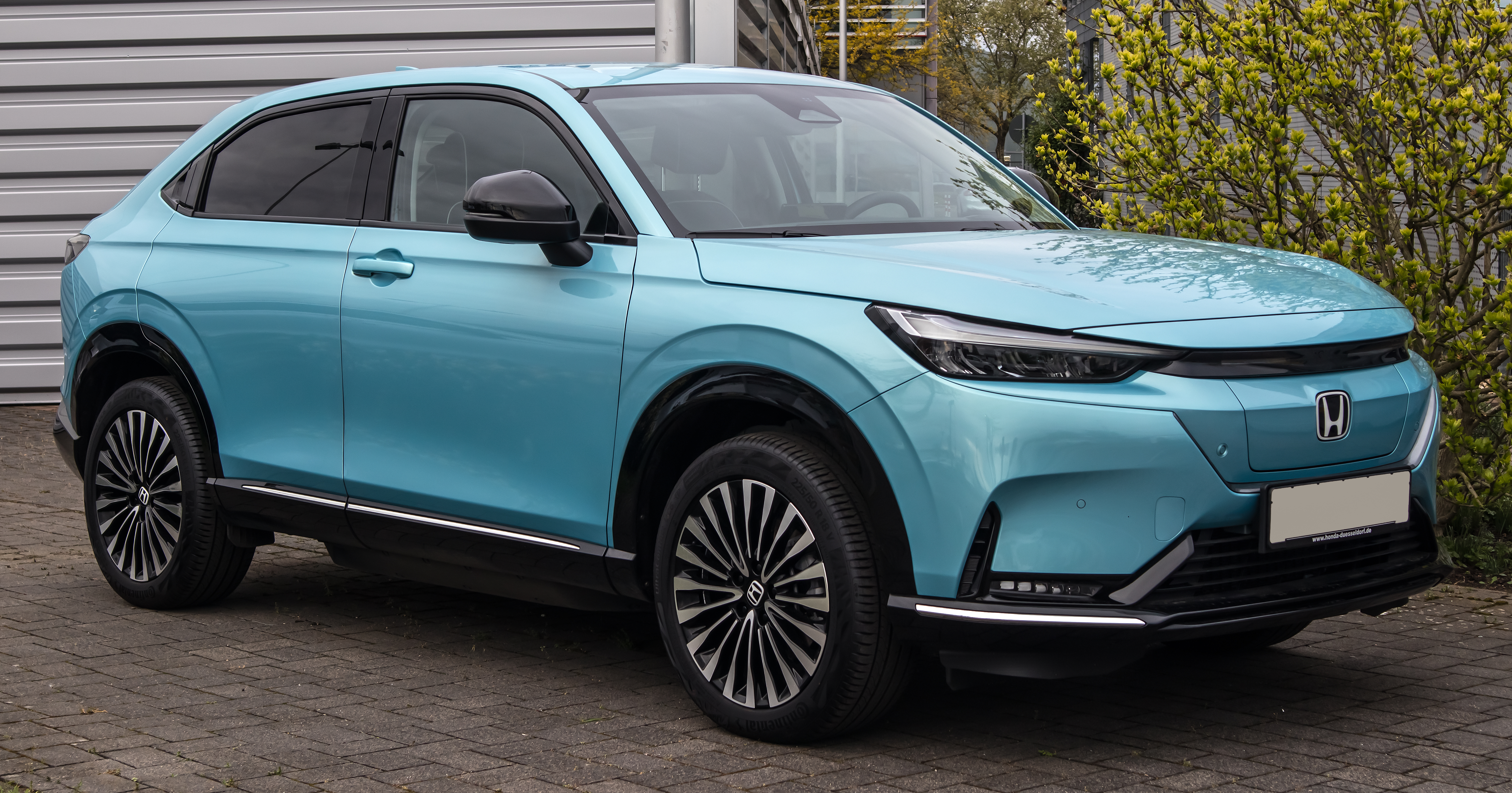
Honda e:Ny1 (Europe)

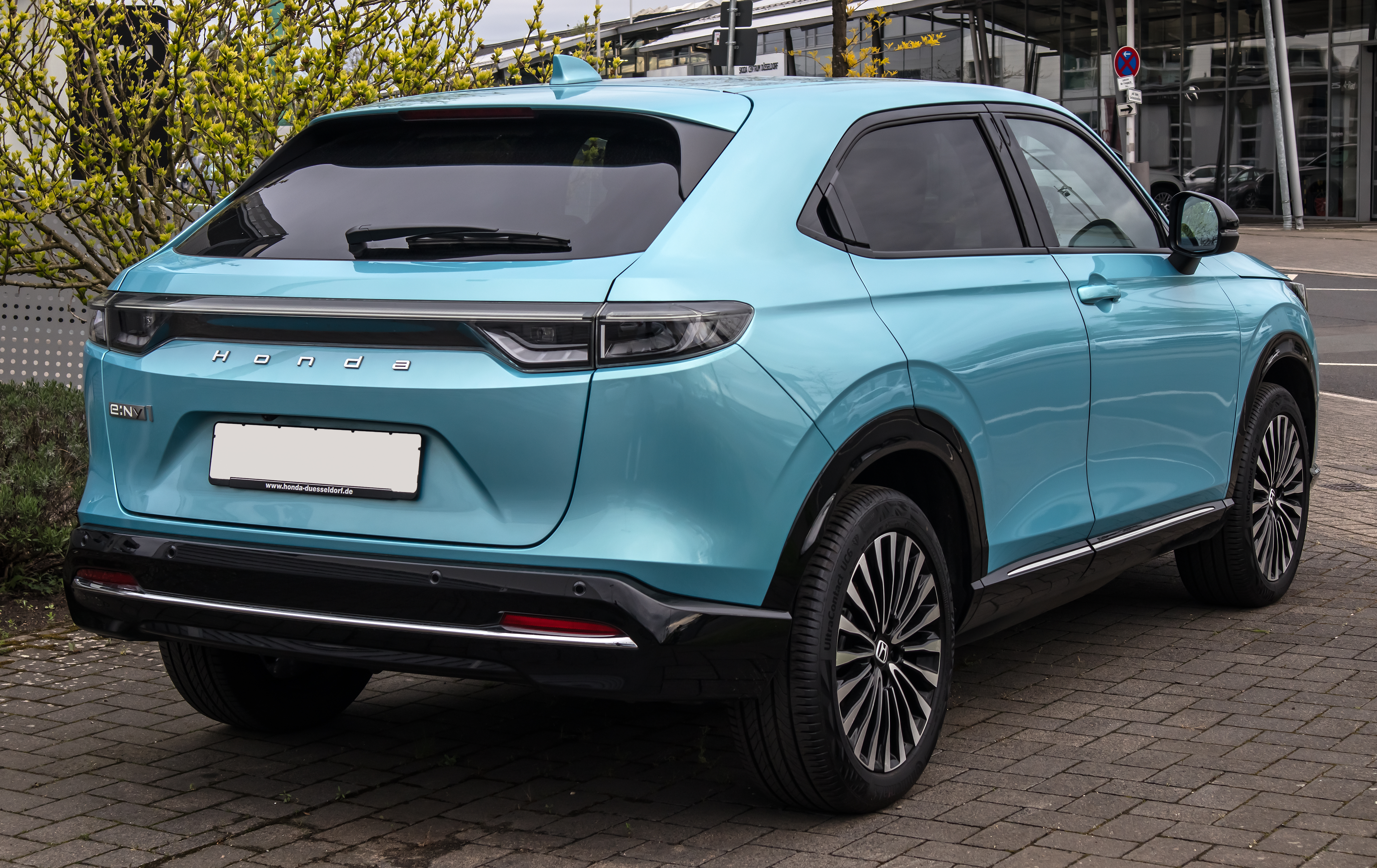
Rear view (e:Ny1)

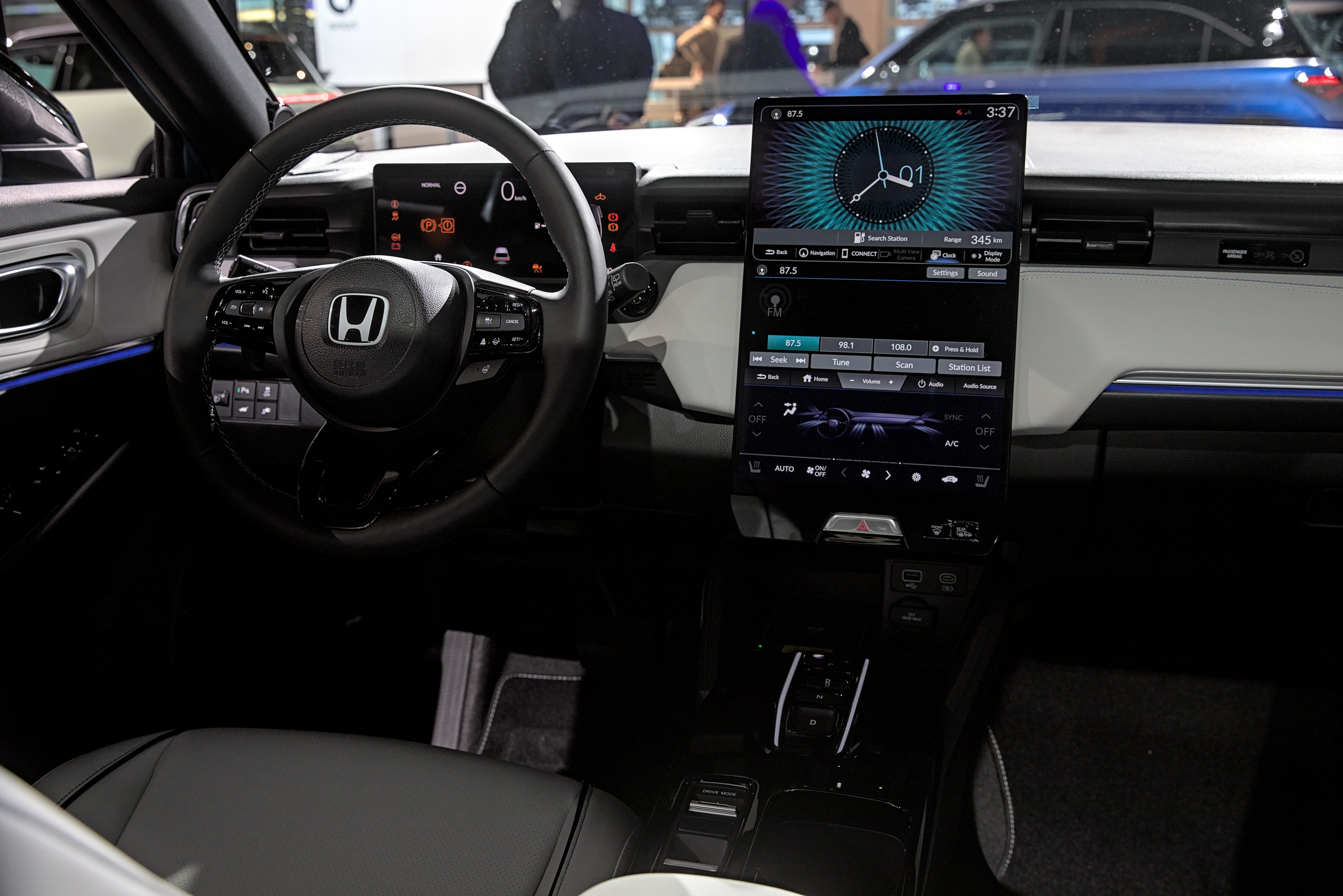
Interior (e:Ny1)

=== Markets ===
==== Americas ====
===== Argentina =====
The third-generation HR-V was launched in Argentina on 31 October 2023, with two trim levels: LX and EXL, it is powered by the 1.5-litre petrol engine.

The facelifted HR-V was launched in Argentina on 11 September 2025, with the same trim levels and engine option from the pre-facelift model.

===== Brazil =====
The Brazilian market third-generation HR-V was introduced on 1 July 2022. It was available with either a 1.5-litre petrol engine or a 1.5-litre turbocharged petrol engine, both paired with a CVT. The former was available on the EX and EXL trim levels, while the latter was available on the Advance and Touring trim levels, Honda Sensing is standard across all trim levels. The third-generation HR-V became available in August 2022 for the 1.5-litre naturally aspirated engine models, while the 1.5-litre turbocharged models became available in October 2022.

The facelifted HR-V was launched in Brazil on 11 June 2025, with the same trim levels and engine options from the pre-facelift model.

===== Jamaica =====
The third-generation HR-V was launched in Jamaica on 10 June 2022, alongside the BR-V. It was offered with either a 1.5-litre petrol or a 1.5-litre hybrid (e:HEV), the former is available on the LX and EX trim levels while the latter was exclusive on the EX-L trim.

==== East Asia ====
===== China =====
Two versions of the petrol models were unveiled in 2022. The Dongfeng Honda XR-V adopted the exterior styling of the HR-V RS marketed in Southeast Asia, while the GAC Honda Vezel used the exterior styling of regular HR-V model.

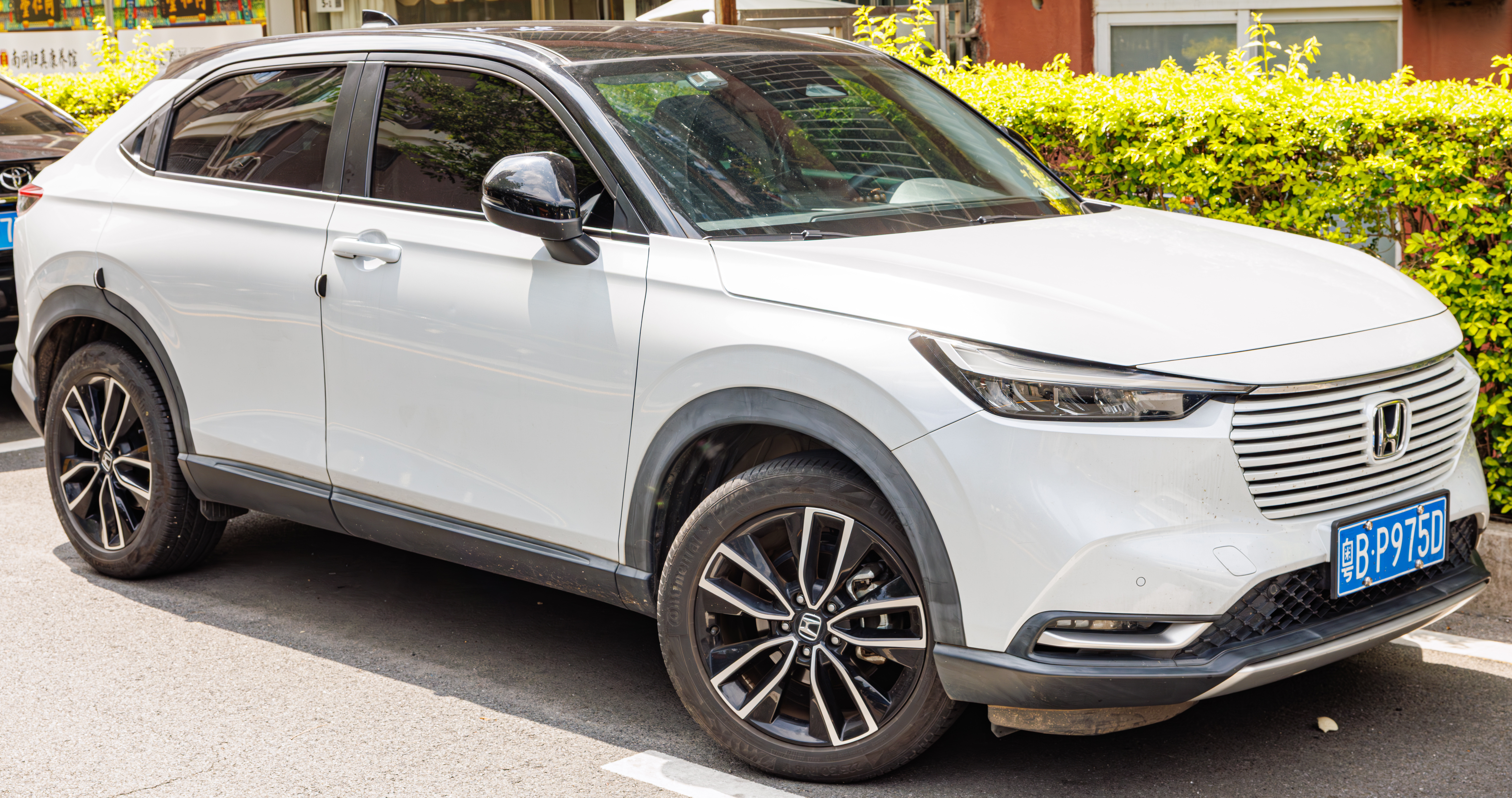
Honda Vezel (China)

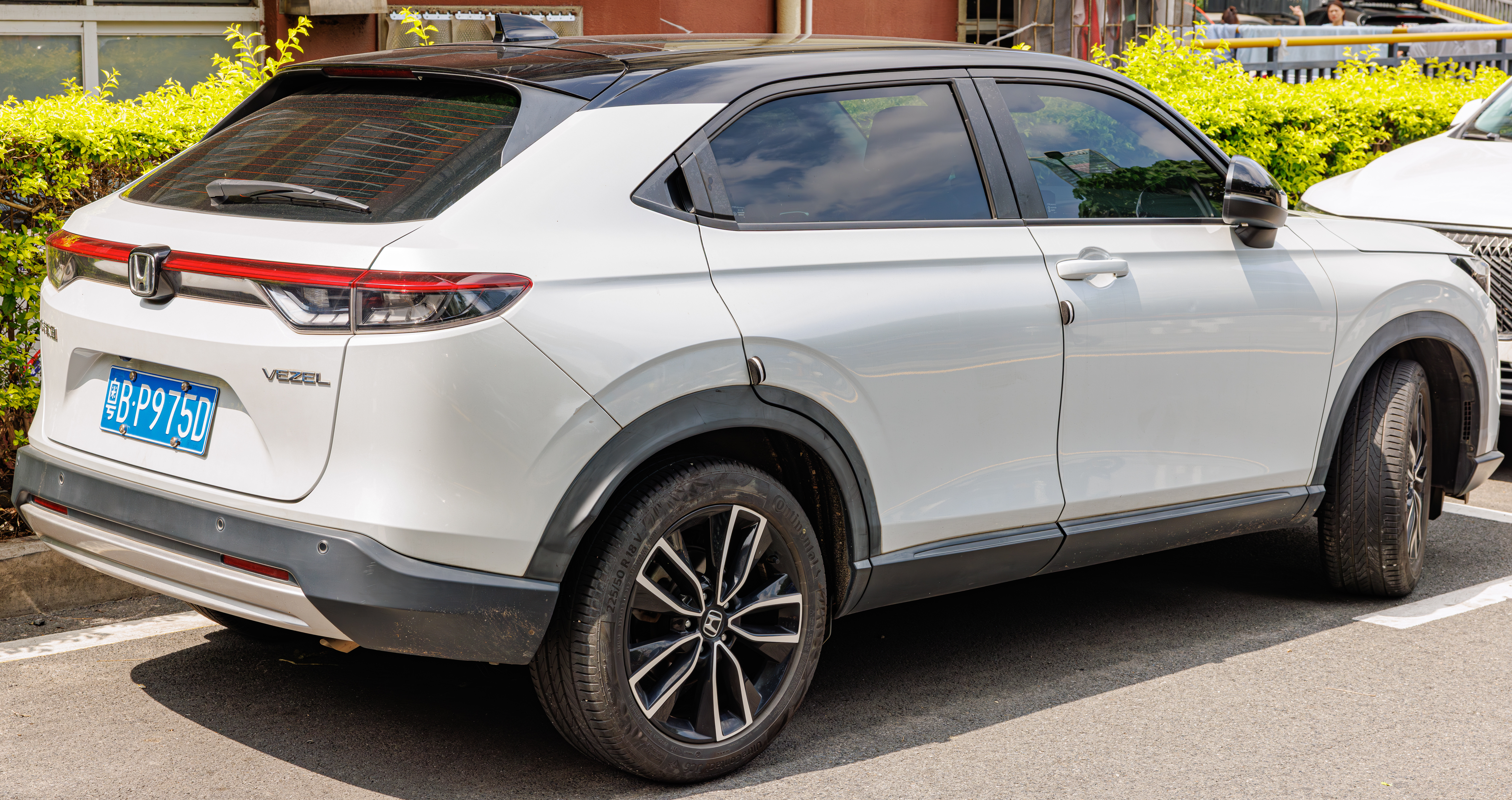
Rear view (Vezel; China)

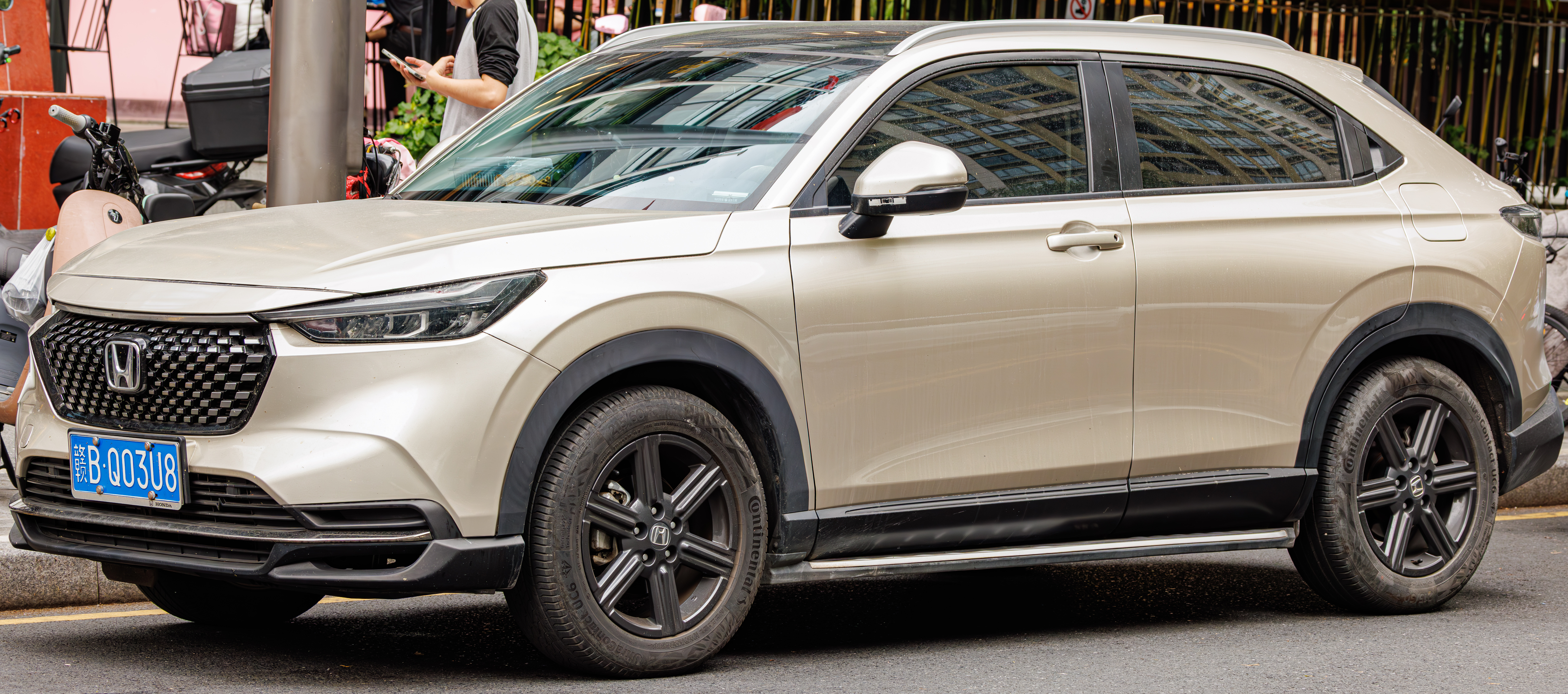
Honda XR-V (China)

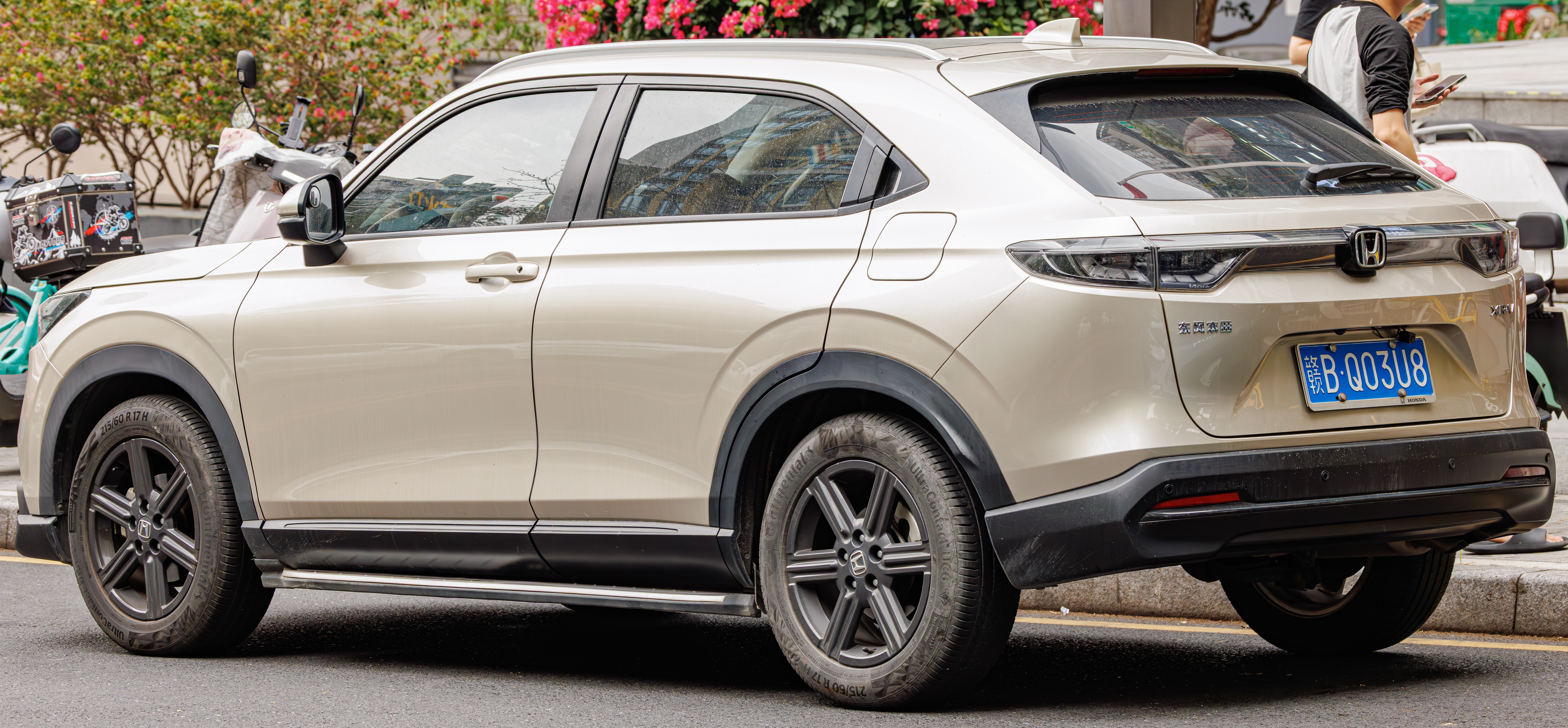
Rear view (XR-V; China)

===== Japan =====
The HR-V was sold in Japan as the Vezel. Four trim levels were available: G, X, Z, and PLaY. Two powertrain options were available: a 1.5-litre petrol (only for the G trim) and a 1.5 e:HEV petrol hybrid (for all trim levels except the G trim); the all-wheel drive option was available for all trims, except on the PLaY trim.

The first facelifted HR-V debuted in Japan in April 2024. The e:HEV X variant became available with the HuNT package and the e:HEV PLay variant became the PLaY package, with all-wheel drive and a panoramic glass roof were included as options.

The e:HEV RS was added on 23 October 2025. The exterior features a black-painted front bumper lower grille, and door lower garnishes, along with a specially designed front grille and RS emblem. 18-inch alumunium wheels are finished in black colour, and the door mirrors are black.

On 22 October 2026, the Vezel received a minor facelift. All grades received a feature blacked-out inner headlamp lenses. Both the e:HEV Z and Z PLaY package features body-coloured arch mouldings and bumper garnishes, while the e:HEV Z PLaY package received a dark clear 18-inch aluminium wheels. The e:HEV X HuNT grade was discontinued.

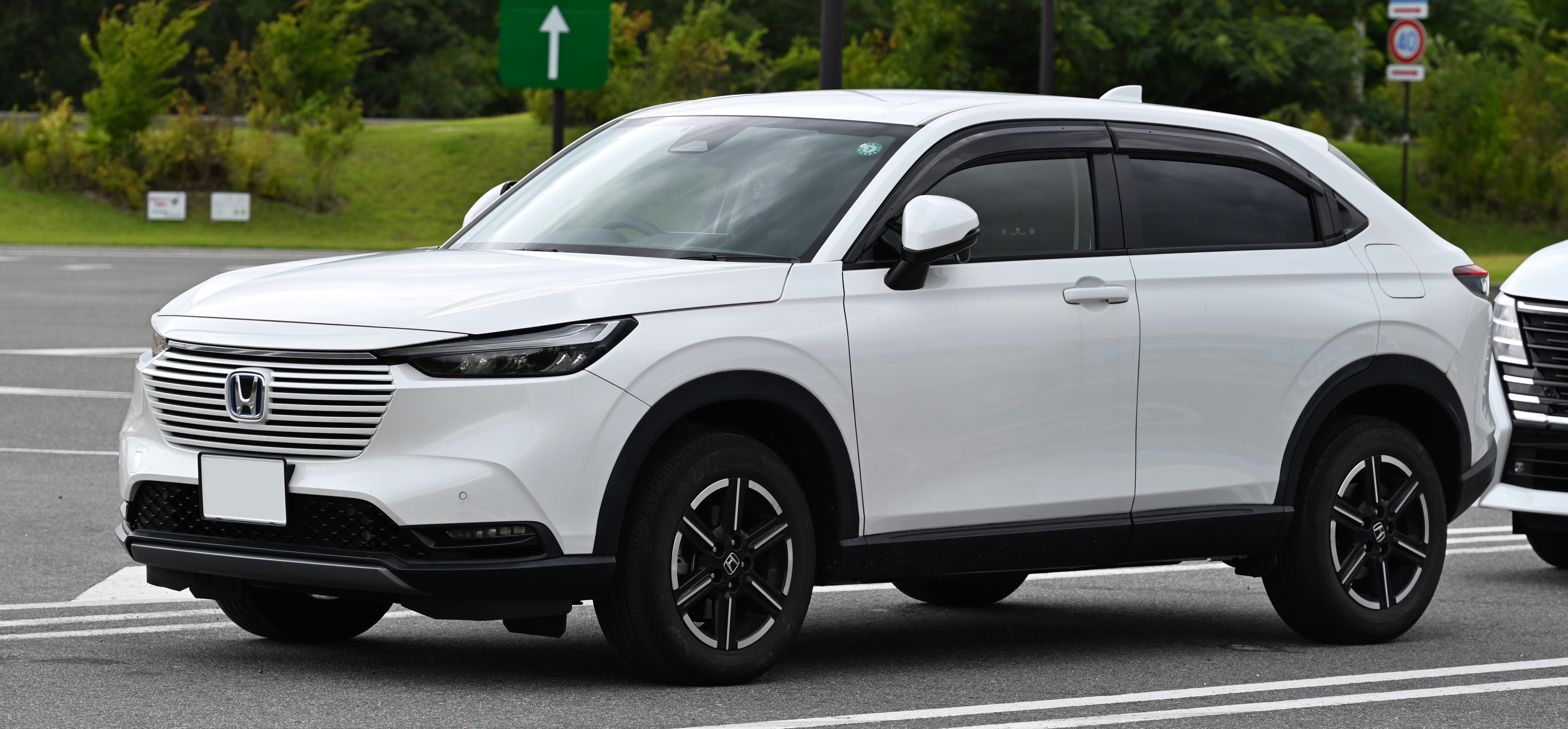
Vezel e:HEV X (pre-facelift, Japan)

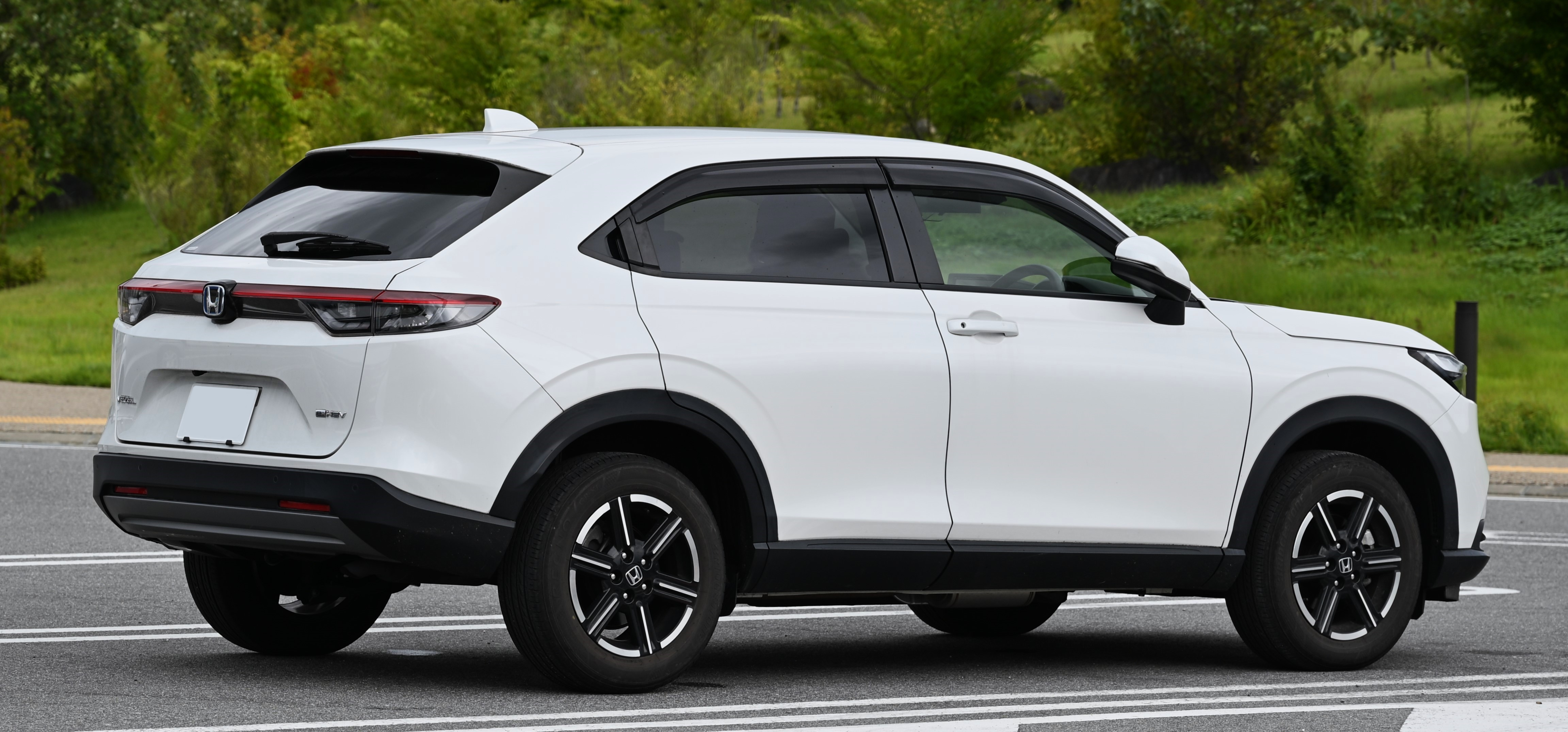
Rear view (pre-facelift, Japan)

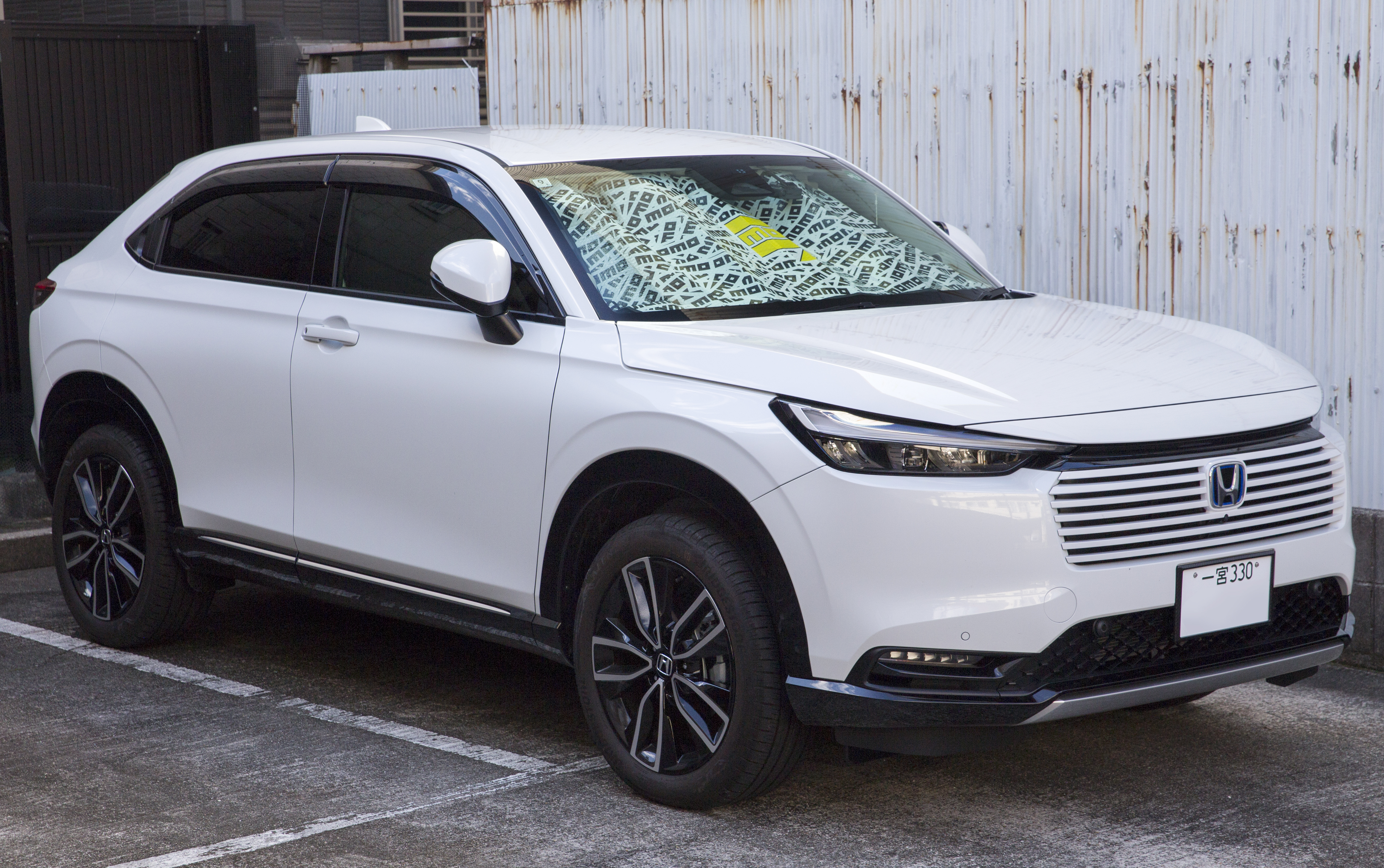
Vezel e:HEV Z (facelift, Japan)

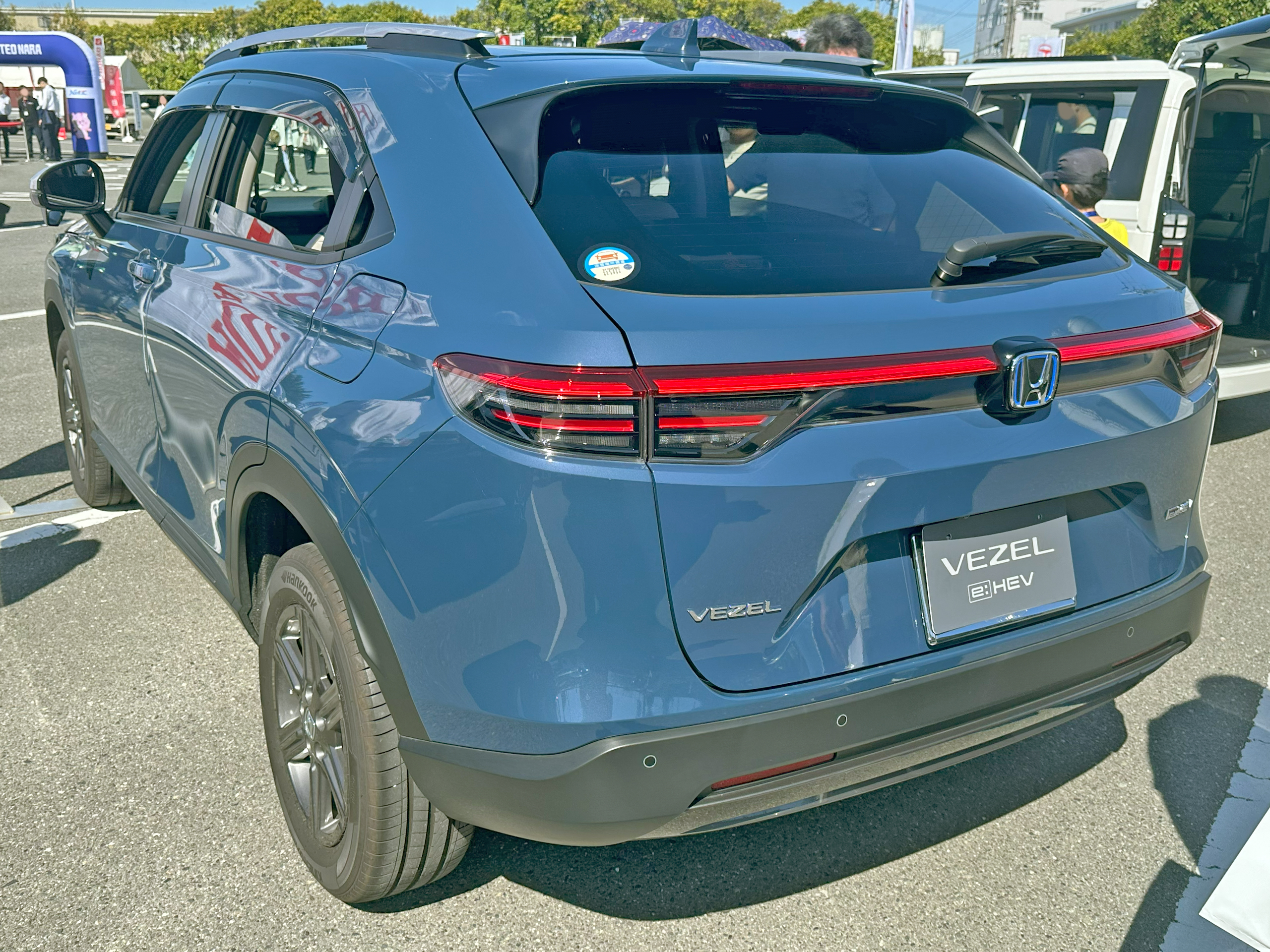
Rear view (facelift, Japan)

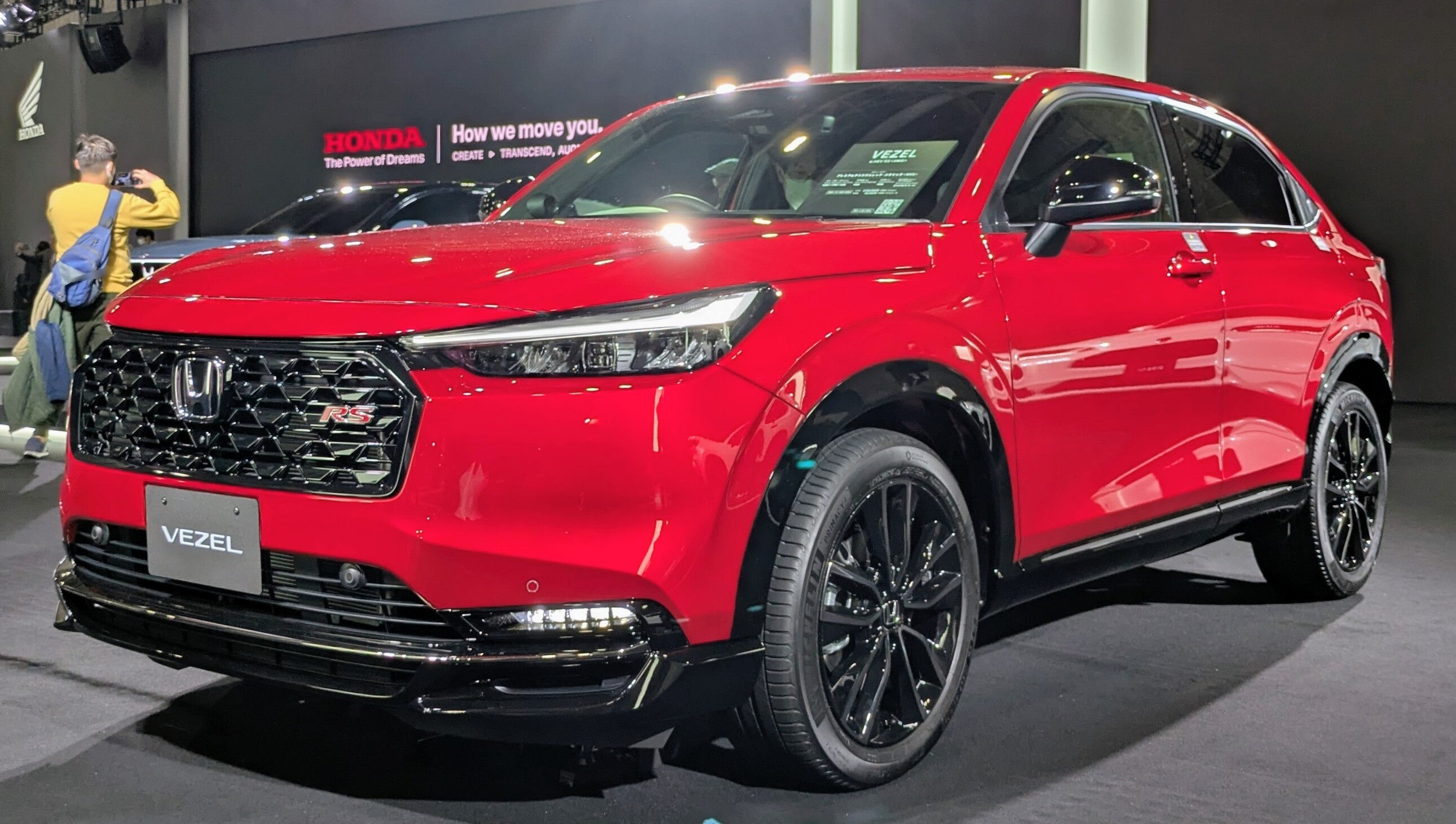
Vezel e:HEV RS

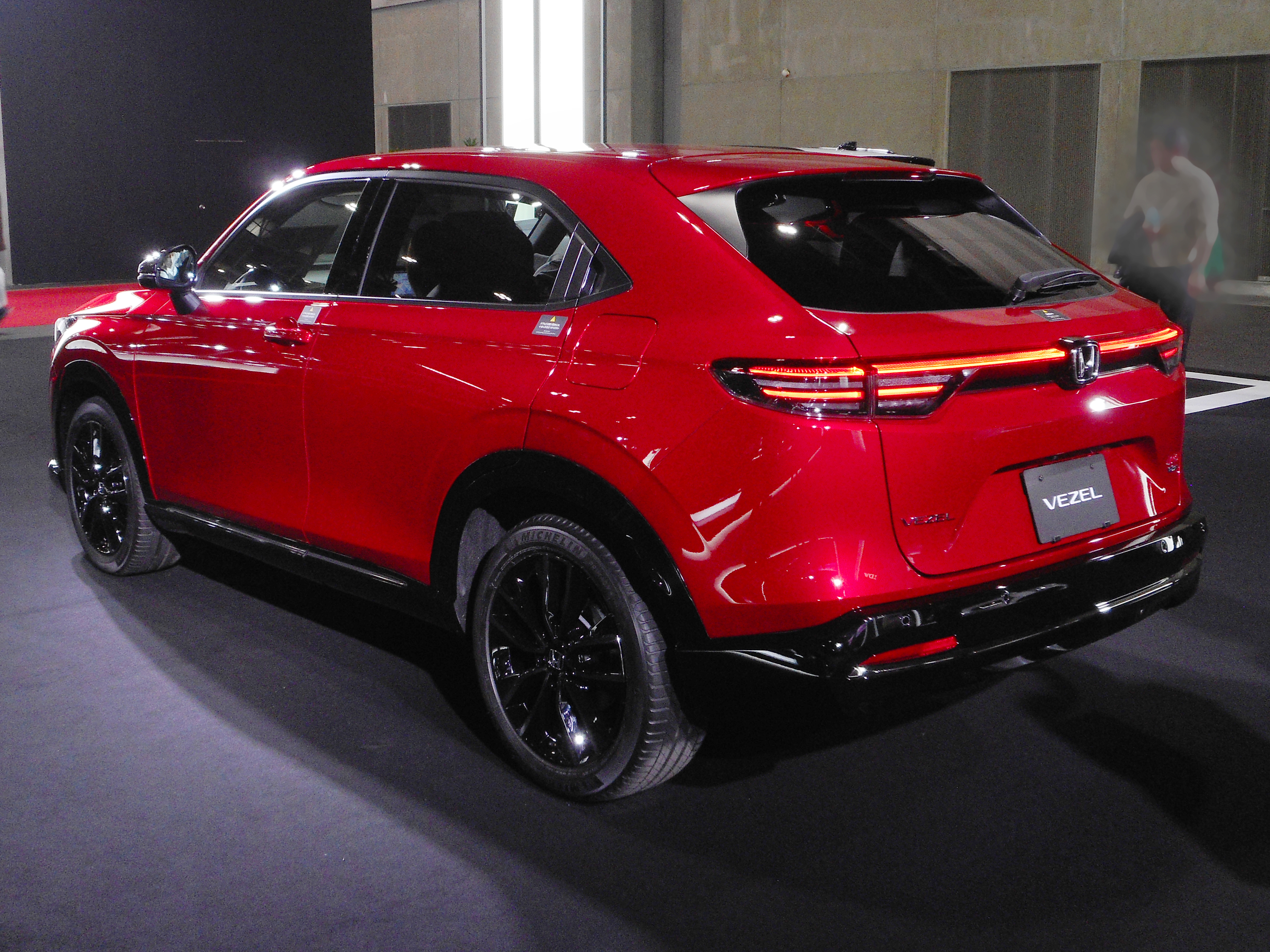
Rear view (e:HEV RS)

===== Taiwan =====
The HR-V was launched in Taiwan on 9 June 2022, with two variants: S+ Sport and Prestige, both variants are powered by the 1.5-litre petrol engine.

The facelifted HR-V was launched in Taiwan on 3 June 2025, with four variants: S, e:HEV S, e:HEV Prestige and e:HEV Prestige Super Edition. For the facelift model, the S variant powered by the 1.5-litre petrol, while the latter three variants are powered by the 1.5-litre petrol hybrid.

==== Europe ====
The third-generation HR-V was released in the European market in October 2021, with three trim levels: Elegance, Advance and Advance Style. In Europe, it was only available with a 1.5-litre petrol hybrid (e:HEV) as part of Honda's plan to electrify all of their mainstream models in Europe by the end of 2022.

The facelifted HR-V was released in Europe in September 2024. Like the pre-facelift model, the facelift is only available with a 1.5-litre petrol hybrid (e:HEV) and front-wheel drive. The facelift model saw the introduction of the Advance Style Plus trim as the flagship trim for the HR-V in Europe.

==== Middle East ====
The third-generation HR-V was launched in the GCC countries on 6 June 2022. It was offered with either a 1.5-litre petrol engine paired with a CVT. In the GCC markets, the HR-V was available in three trim levels: DX, LX, and EX. Honda Sensing was standard for the LX and EX trims.

The facelift HR-V was launched on 16 June 2025.

==== Oceania ====
===== Australia =====
The third-generation HR-V was launched in Australia on 12 May 2022. It was offered with either a 1.5-litre petrol engine (Vi) or a 1.5-litre petrol hybrid (e:HEV), with the former was offered on the X trim, while the latter was offered on the L trim. Honda Sensing was standard on all variants. The Australian market HR-V was only certified as a four-seater instead of five-seater due to the lack of a top tether point for the middle seat, which was required by Australian Design Rules.

The facelifted HR-V was launched in Australia on 1 October 2024, with the addition of the e:HEV X variant. In June 2026, the e:HEV RS variant was introduced as the flagship variant.

===== New Zealand =====
The third-generation HR-V was launched in New Zealand on 20 August 2024, in the sole e:HEV Sport variant, powered by the 1.5-litre petrol hybrid (e:HEV).

In June 2026, the top-trim RS and the entry-level L was added. The change coincided with the name change from Sport to LX.

==== South Africa ====
The third-generation HR-V was launched in South Africa on 3 June 2022, in two trim levels: Comfort and Executive, it is powered by the 1.5-litre L15ZF I4 petrol engine paired with a CVT. In May 2025, both the Comfort and Executive trims were merged into the sole Elegance trim.

The facelifted HR-V was launched in South Africa on 15 July 2025, with the same sole variant from the pre-facelift model.

==== South Asia ====
===== Pakistan =====
The third-generation HR-V was launched in Pakistan on 21 October 2022. Locally assembled in Pakistan, it was offered in two variants: VTi and VTi-S, both variants were powered by the 1.5-litre petrol engine paired with a CVT and Honda Sensing standard on all trims.

The facelifted HR-V was launched in Pakistan on 28 July 2025, with three variants: VTi, VTi-S and e:HEV. For the facelift model, the VTi and VTi-S variants powered by the 1.5-litre petrol engine, while the e:HEV powered by the 1.5-litre petrol hybrid.

==== Southeast Asia ====
===== Brunei =====
The third-generation HR-V was launched in Brunei on late June 2022, which was imported from Thailand. In Brunei, it was only available with the EX variant, powered by the 1.5-litre petrol engine paired with a CVT, and Honda Sensing was standard.

===== Indonesia =====
The third-generation HR-V was launched in Indonesia on 23 March 2022. It was offered with either a 1.5-litre petrol or a 1.5-litre turbocharged petrol engine, both paired with a CVT. The former was available on S, E, and SE trim levels, while the latter was only available on RS trim. Honda Sensing is standard across all trims.

The facelifted HR-V was launched in Indonesia on 10 June 2025, with the 1.5-litre petrol for the E and E+ trim levels, and the 1.5-litre petrol hybrid (e:HEV) for the Standard, Modulo and RS trim levels. The 1.5-litre turbocharged petrol engine was discontinued for the facelifted model.

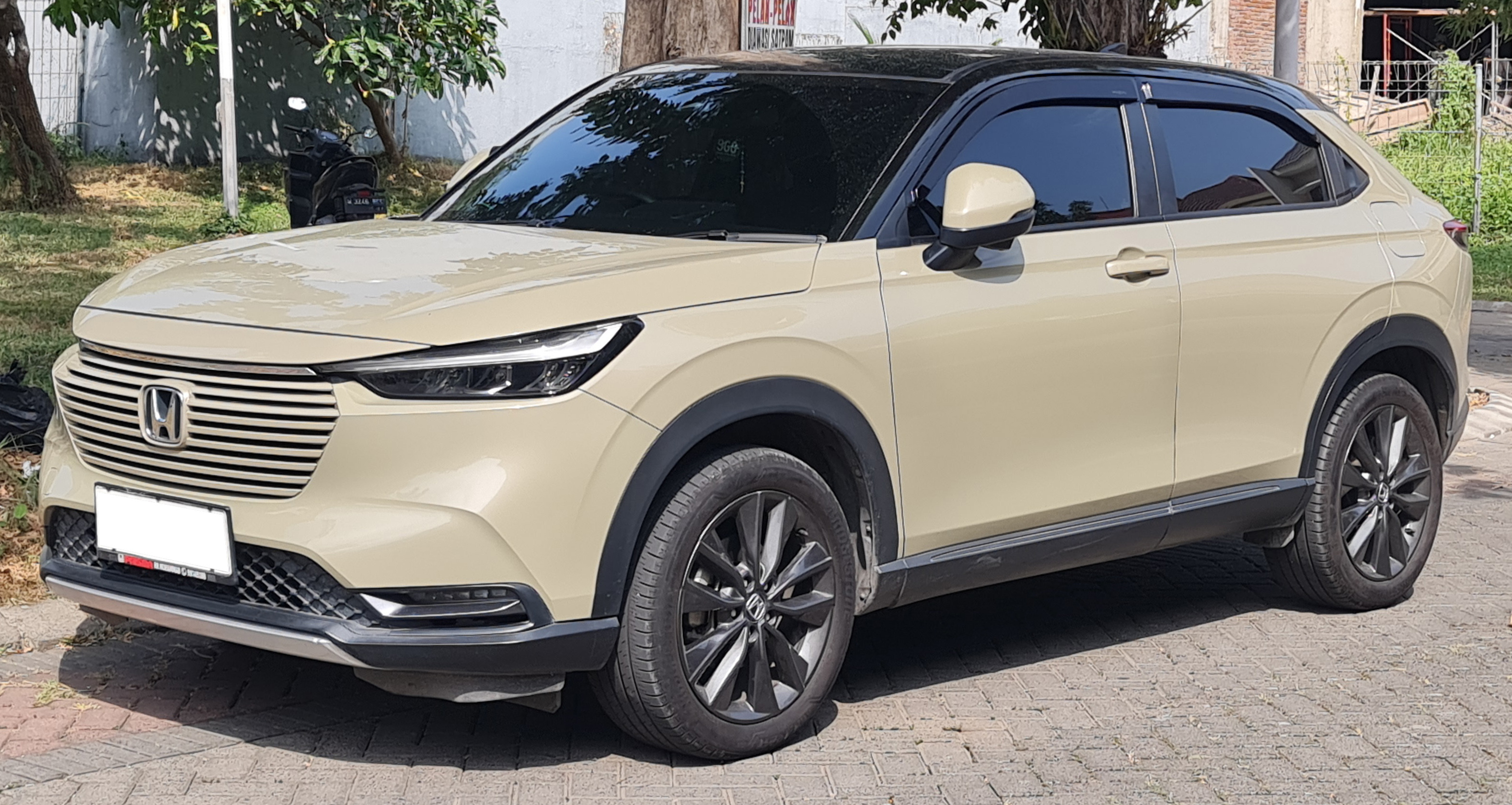
2023 HR-V SE (Indonesia)

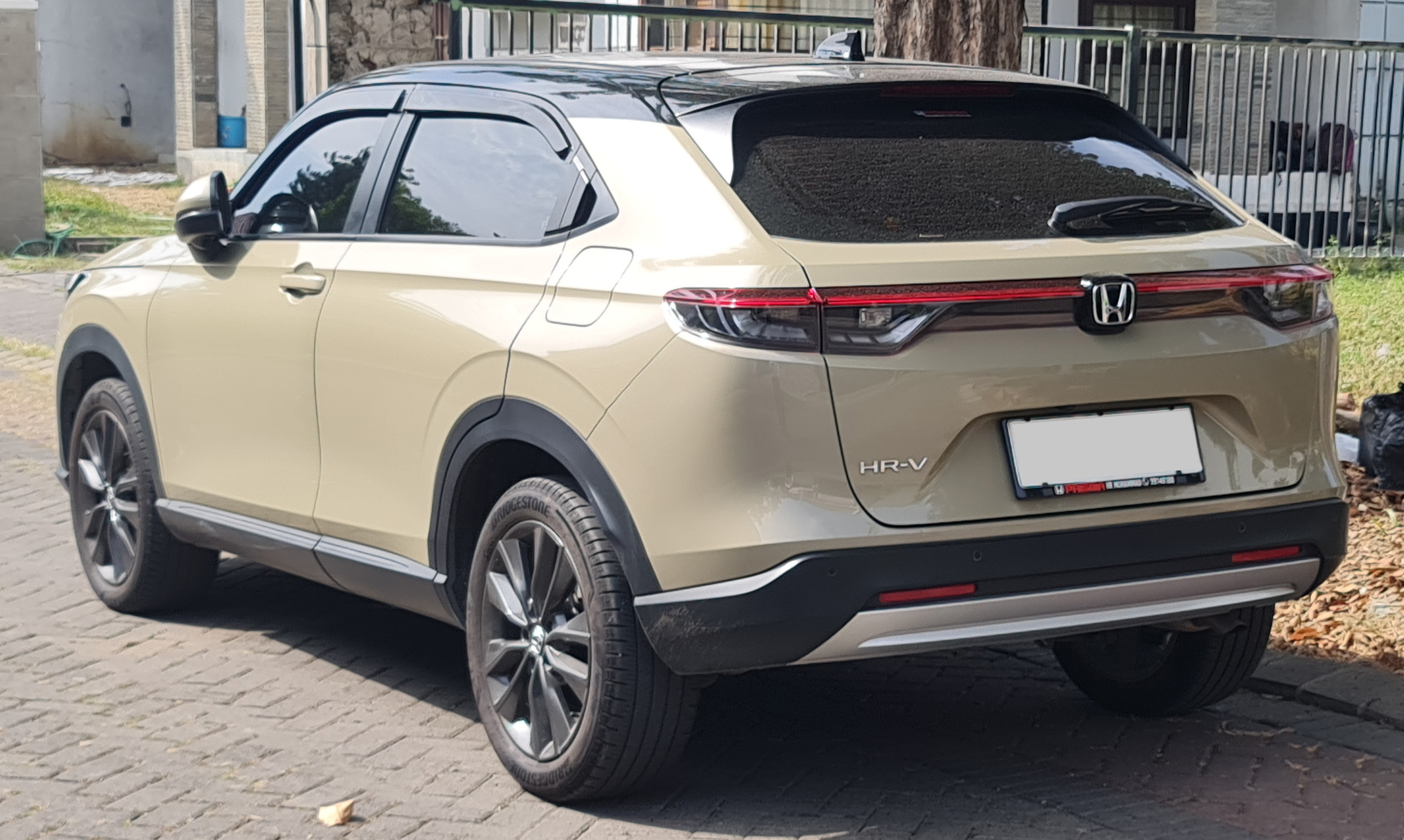
Rear view

===== Malaysia =====
The third-generation HR-V was launched in Malaysia on 14 July 2022, and it became available on retail sales by August 2022. It was offered with three powertrains: a 1.5-litre petrol engine, a 1.5-litre turbocharged petrol engine, or a 1.5-litre hybrid (e:HEV), all paired with a CVT. The standard 1.5-litre engine is offered on the S trim, the turbocharged engine were offered on both E and V trim levels, and the e:HEV variant was offered on the RS trim. Honda Sensing is standard across all trims.

The facelifted HR-V was launched in Malaysia on 17 July 2025, with the same variants from the pre-facelift model.

===== Philippines =====
The third-generation HR-V was launched in the Philippines on 19 April 2022 with two variants: S and V Turbo. The HR-V RS Turbo variant was launched during the 8th Philippine International Motor Show on 15 September 2022. For powertrains, it was offered with either a 1.5-litre petrol or a 1.5-litre turbocharged petrol engine, both paired with a CVT transmission; with the former offered on the S trim and the latter offered on the V and RS trim levels. Honda Sensing was standard on all variants.

The facelifted HR-V went on sale in the Philippines on 1 March 2025 with three variants available: S, V and RS e:HEV. For the facelift model, the S and V variants powered by the 1.5-litre petrol, while the RS variant powered by the 1.5-litre petrol hybrid (e:HEV).

===== Singapore =====
The third-generation HR-V was launched in Singapore on 21 January 2022, with two trim levels: DX and HX. Two powertrain options are available: a 1.5-litre petrol for the DX and a 1.5-litre petrol hybrid (e:HEV) for the HX.

The facelifted HR-V was launched in Singapore on 27 July 2024, with the same variants from the pre-facelift model.

===== Thailand =====
The third-generation HR-V was launched in Thailand on 5 November 2021, with three trim levels: E, EL and RS; Honda Sensing was standard on all trim levels. Assembled locally, it was only available with the 1.5-litre petrol hybrid (e:HEV).

The facelifted HR-V was launch in Thailand on 8 November 2024, with the same variants from the pre-facelift model.

===== Vietnam =====
The third-generation HR-V was launched in Vietnam on 15 June 2022 in L and RS Turbo trim levels, while the HR-V G trim was launched on 15 December 2022. It was offered with either a 1.5-litre petrol or a 1.5-litre turbocharged petrol engine, both paired with a CVT, with the former offered on the G trim, while the latter offered on the L and RS trim levels. Honda Sensing is standard across all trims.

The facelifted HR-V was launched in Vietnam on 4 April 2025 with three variants: G, L and RS e:HEV. For the facelift model, the G and L variants powered by the 1.5-litre petrol, while the RS variant powered by the 1.5-litre petrol hybrid (e:HEV).

=== Safety ===
==== ANCAP ====
ANCAP test results Honda HR-V (2022, aligned with Euro NCAP)
Test	Points	%
Overall:	4 /5 stars	
Adult occupant:	31.34	82%
Child occupant:	37.73	77%
Pedestrian:	39.13	72%
Safety assist:	10.05	69%

==== ASEAN NCAP ====
ASEAN NCAP test results Honda HR-V (2022)
Test	Points
Overall:	5 /5 stars
Adult occupant:	35.00
Child occupant:	17.81
Safety assist:	17.57
Motorcyclist Safety:	10.00

==== Euro NCAP ====
In a Euro NCAP testing conducted in 2022, the HR-V e:HEV received a four-star rating.

Euro NCAP test results Honda HR-V (2022)
Test	Points	%
Overall:	4 /5 stars	
Adult occupant:	31.3	82%
Child occupant:	36.8	75%
Pedestrian:	39.1	72%
Safety assist:	12.6	78%

==== TNCAP ====
TNCAP (1.0) test result Honda HR-V S (2025, similar to Euro NCAP 2017)
Test	Points	%
Overall:	4/5 stars	
Adult occupant:	30.936	81%
Child occupant:	34.08	69%
Pedestrian:	33.284	79%
Safety assist:	8.241	68%

== North American and Chinese version / ZR-V (RZ; 2022) ==
A separate North American HR-V model was unveiled on 4 April 2022 and went on sale on 7 June 2022 for the 2023 model year. Based on the Honda Architecture (HA) platform shared with the Civic (eleventh generation) and categorised as a subcompact crossover SUV, it was sold outside of North America, such as in China (as the ZR-V and HR-V) and Europe (as the ZR-V) to positioned between the global HR-V model and the CR-V. Chinese models are produced by both Guangqi Honda (ZR-V) and Dongfeng Honda (HR-V) respectively.

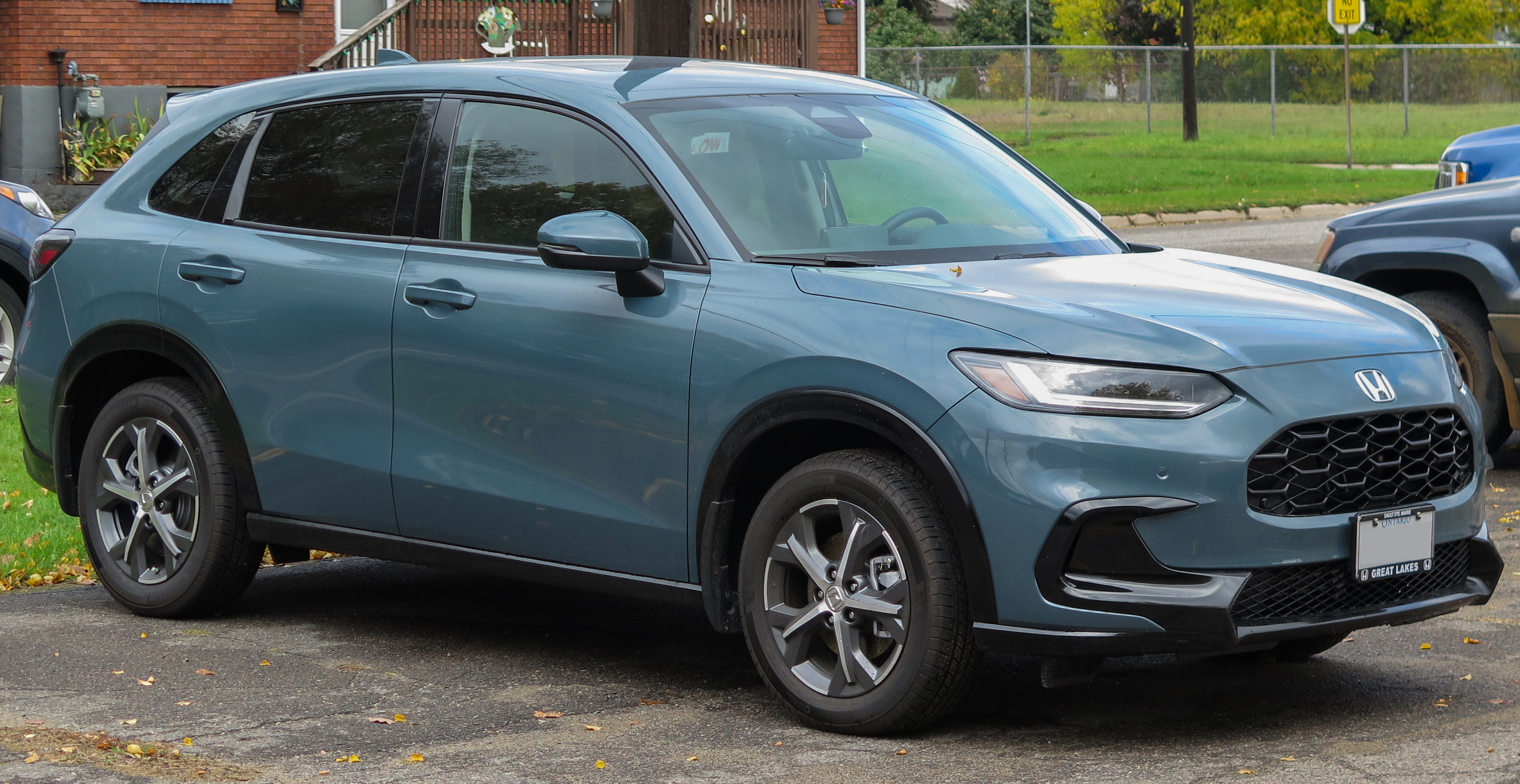
2023 HR-V EX-L (US)

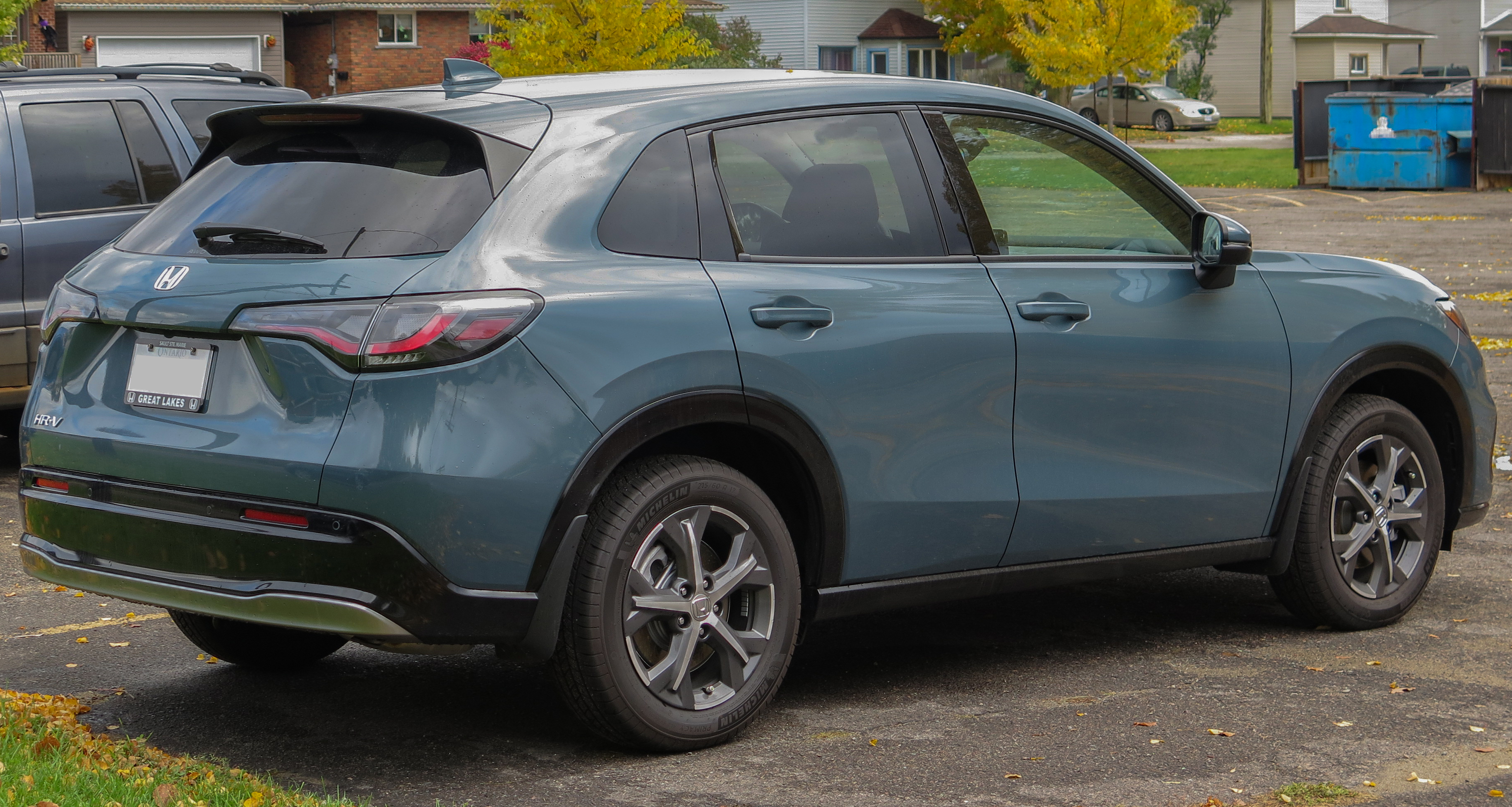
Rear view (HR-V EX-L, US)

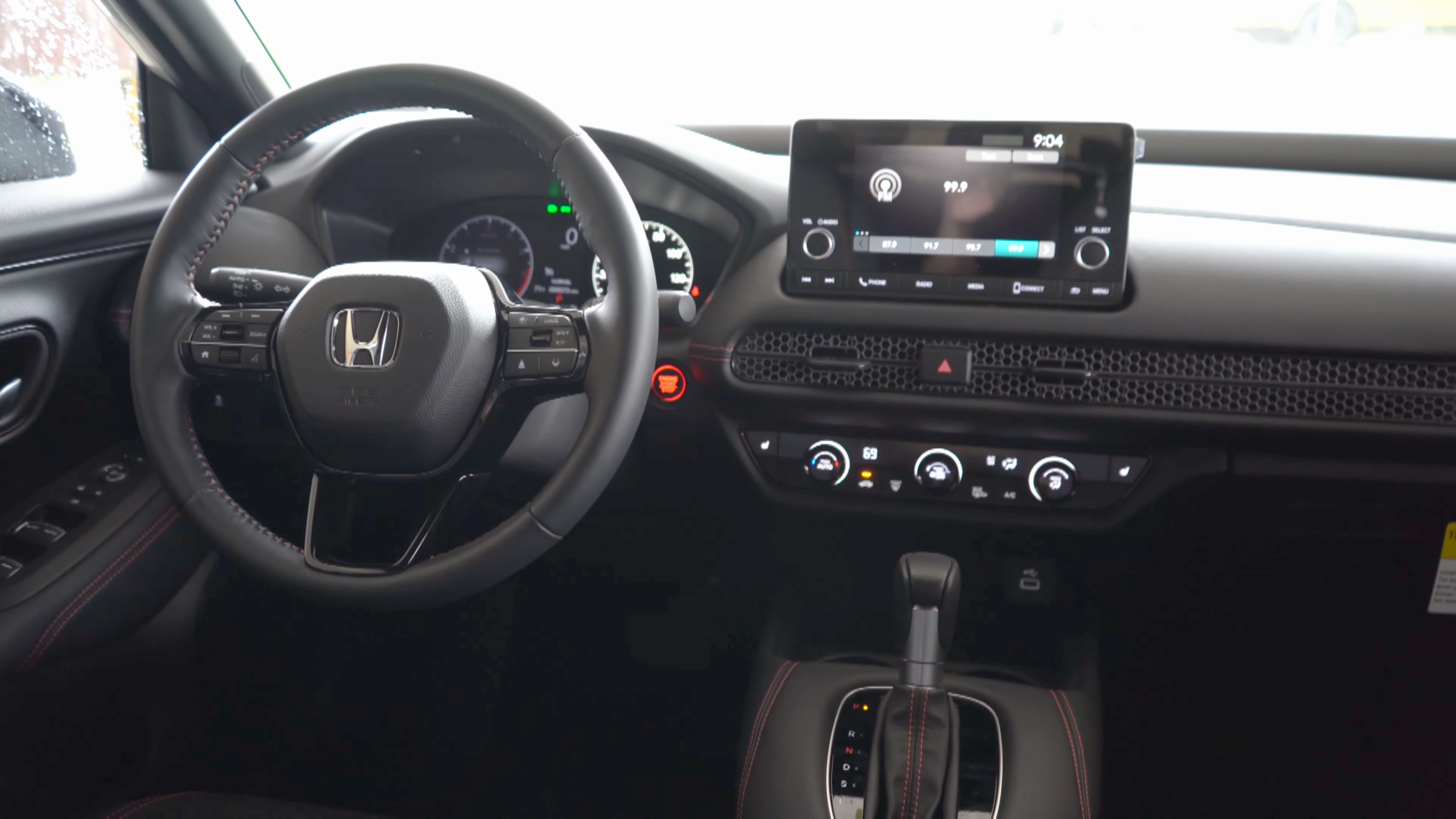
Interior (HR-V Sport, US)

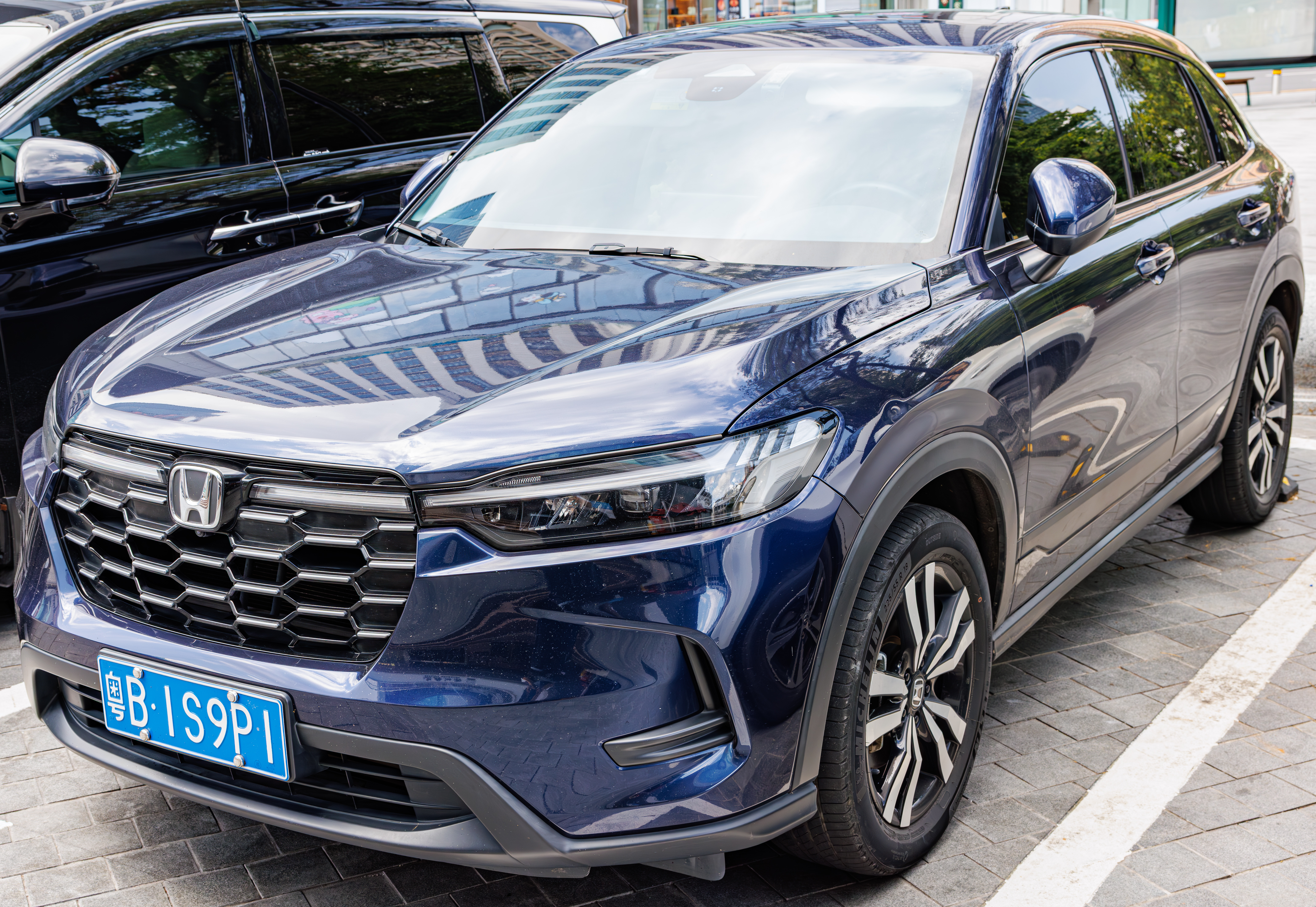
2023 HR-V (China)

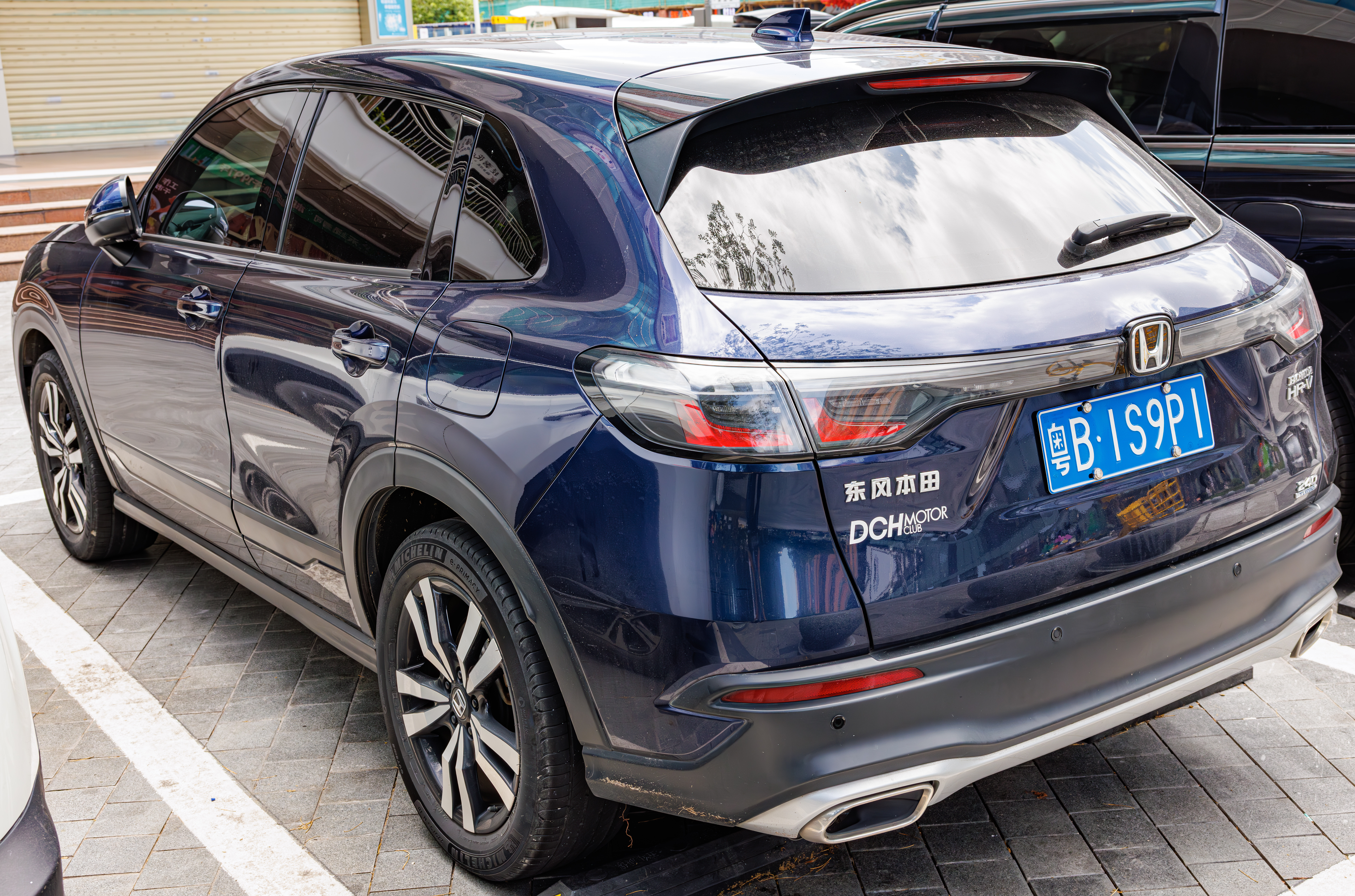
Rear view (HR-V, China)

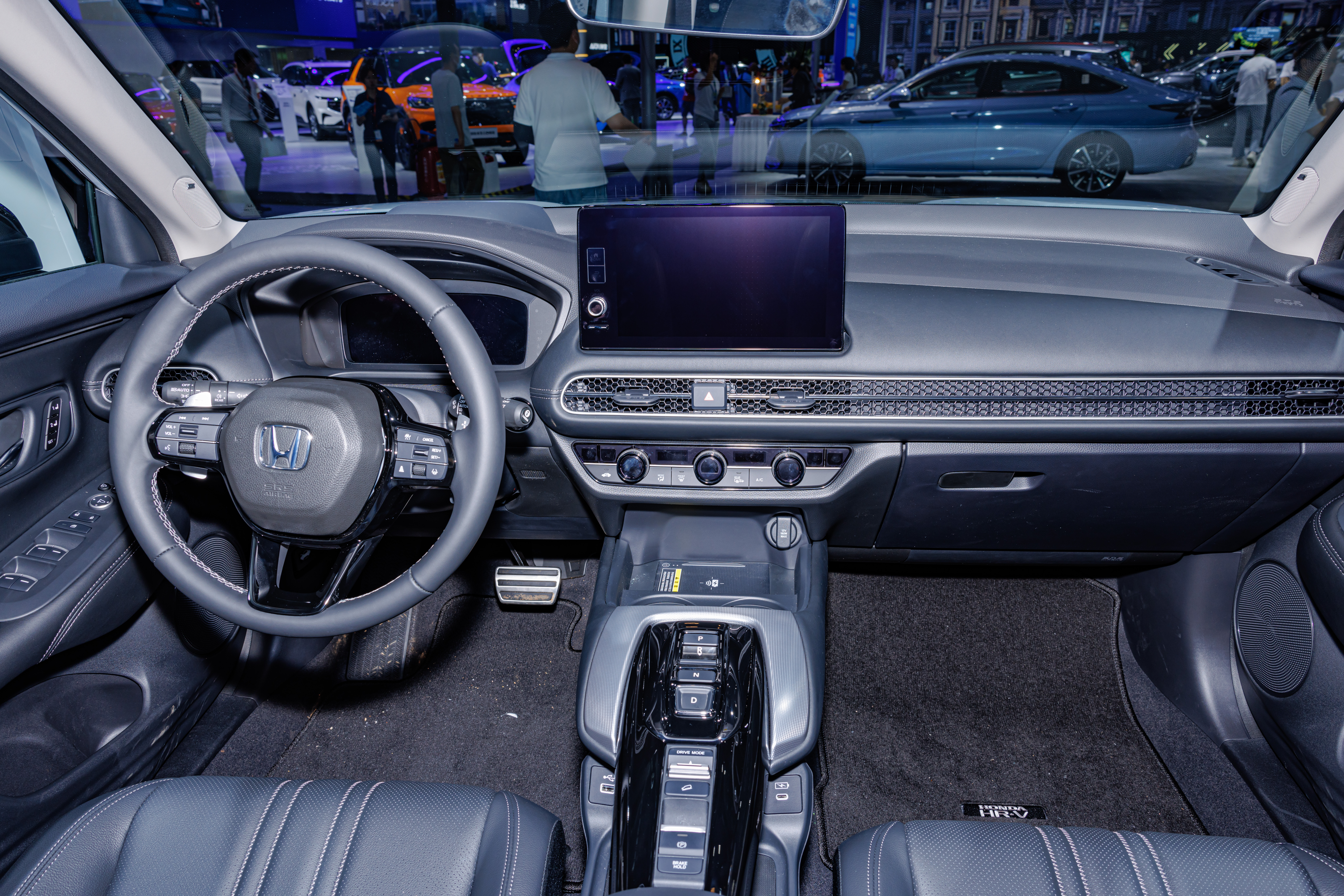
Interior (HR-V, China)
