= Itirapina Ecological Station =

- Estação Ecológica de Itirapina
- IUCN category Ia (strict nature reserve)
- Location within Brazil
- Nearest city: Itirapina, São Paulo
- Coordinates: 22°12′59″S 47°53′19″W
- Area: 2,300 ha (8.9 sq mi)
- Designation: Ecological station
- Created: 7 June 1984
- Administrator: Instituto Florestal SP

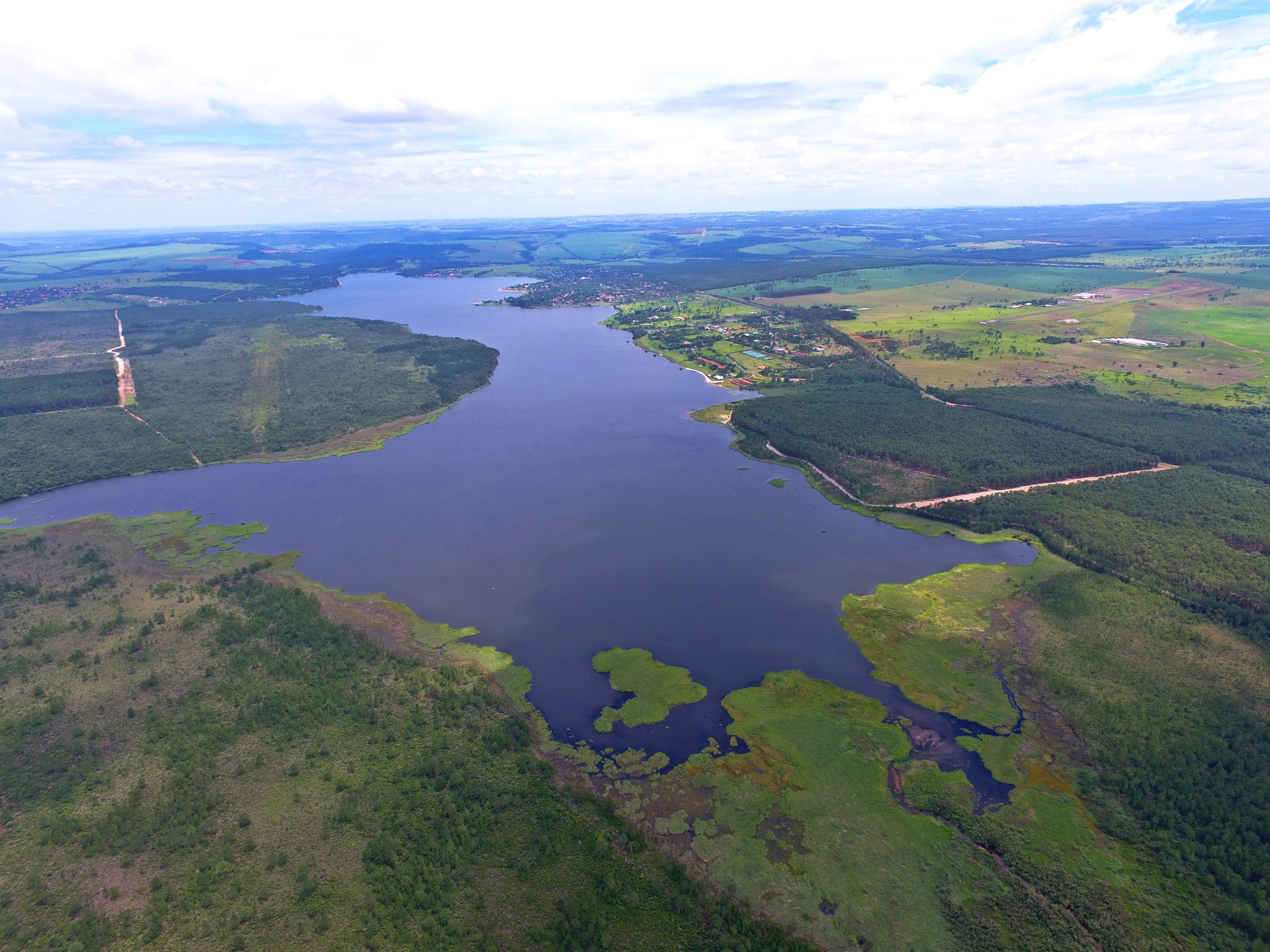
Aerial view of the ecological station

The Itirapina Ecological Station (Portuguese: Estação Ecológica de Itirapina) is an Ecological station in the state of São Paulo, Brazil.

== Location ==
The Itirapina Ecological Station is divided between the municipalities of Brotas (44.15%) and Itirapina (55.85%) in the state of São Paulo. It has an area of 2,300 hectares (5,700 acres). The area contains a sample of remnants of cerrado vegetation, and also has an important fluvial network that supplies the Lobo Dam.

The Itirapina Ecological State and the Itirapina Experimental Station are managed as a whole, and together have an area of 5,512 hectares (13,620 acres). 94% of the ecological station has cerrado vegetation, mostly rocky, clean or wet meadows, as well as cerrado strict sense, riverside forests and cerradão. The experimental station covers 3,212 hectares (7,940 acres) including a large area reforested with fast-growing pine and eucalyptus. It is used for forestry research. The buffer zone for the two units covers 19,602 hectares (48,440 acres).

== History ==
The Itirapina Ecological Station was created by Governor André Franco Montoro by state decree 22.335 of 7 June 1984. The ecological station was on publicly owned land. It had the objective of ensuring the integrity of the ecosystems and river complex it contains, protecting its fauna and flora, and supporting scientific research and education.

== Sources ==
- ESEC de Itirapina (in Portuguese), ISA: Instituto Socioambiental
- Seja bem-vindo às estações Ecológica e Experimental de Itirapina! (in Portuguese), Instituto Florestal
- Zanchetta, Denise (2006), Plano de Manejo Integrado das Unidades de Itirapina (PDF) (in Portuguese)
