= Itirapina =

- Municipality
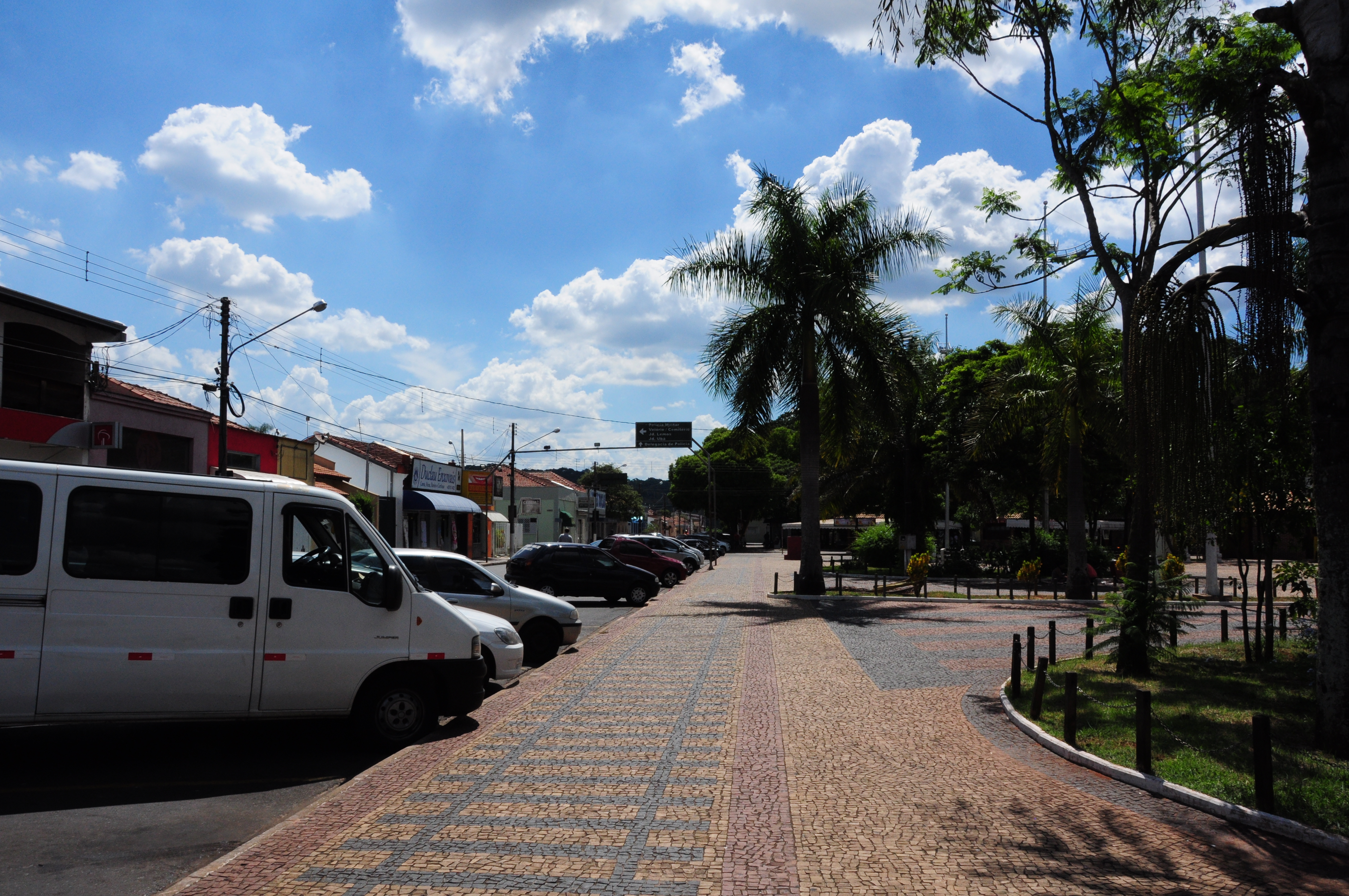
- View of center in Itirapina

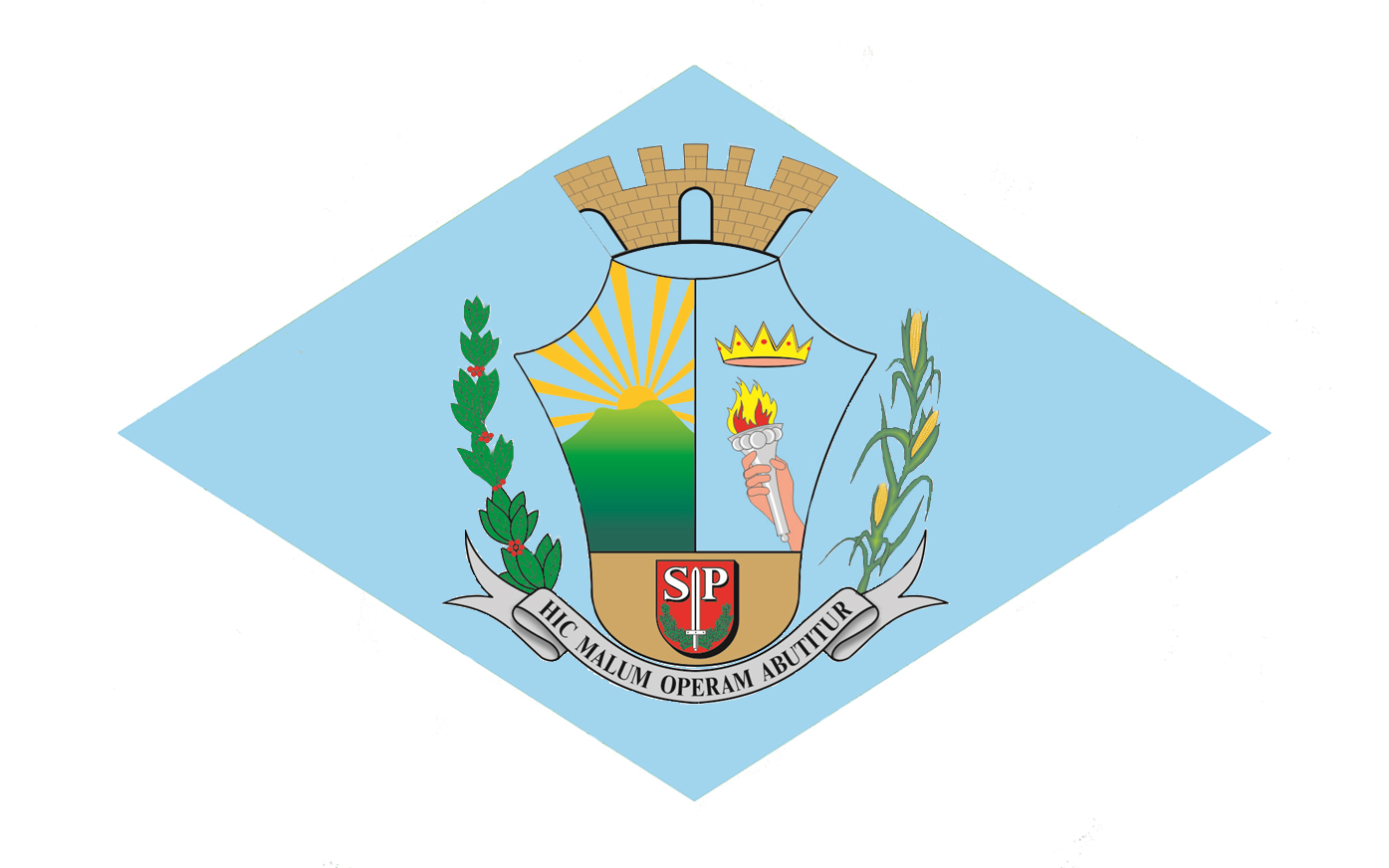
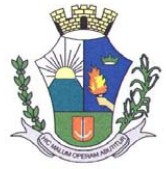
- Flag Coat of arms

- Location in São Paulo state

- Location in Brazil
- Coordinates: 22°15′10″S 47°49′22″W
- Country: Brazil
- Region: Southeast
- State: São Paulo

Area
  - Total: 565 km^{2} (218 sq mi)

Population (2020)
  - Total: 18,387
  - Density: 32.5/km^{2} (84.3/sq mi)
- Time zone: UTC−3 (BRT)

Itirapina is a municipality in the state of São Paulo in Brazil. The population is 18,387 (2020 est.) in an area of 565 km^{2}. The elevation is 770 m.

The municipality contains 56% of the Itirapina Ecological Station, created in 1984.

== Media ==
In telecommunications, the city was served by Companhia Telefônica Brasileira until 1973, when it began to be served by Telecomunicações de São Paulo. In July 1998, this company was acquired by Telefónica, which adopted the Vivo brand in 2012.

The company is currently an operator of cell phones, fixed lines, internet (fiber optics/4G) and television (satellite and cable).
