= List of Honda assembly plants =

Honda Motor Company, Ltd. operates plants worldwide for the manufacture of their products. In a vehicle identification number (VIN), the 11th digit indicates the factory the auto has been built in.

VIN	Name	Location	Products	Opened	Notes
	Dongfeng Honda	Wuhan, China	Honda CR-V; Honda Civic; Honda Elysion; Honda HR-V; Honda Inspire; Honda UR-V; Honda XR-V; Honda e:NS2; Honda S7	2003	
L	American Honda Motor Company (East Liberty Auto Plant)	East Liberty, Ohio, United States	Honda CR-V; Acura RDX; Acura MDX	1989	
2	GAC Honda	Guangzhou, China	Honda Accord; Honda Avancier; Honda Breeze; Honda Integra; Honda Odyssey; Honda Vezel; Honda P7	1998	The first production line of Honda in China.
	Honda Atlas Cars Pakistan	Lahore, Pakistan	Honda City; Honda Civic; Honda HR-V	1992	
H	Honda of Canada Manufacturing	Alliston, Ontario, Canada	Honda Civic; Honda CR-V	1986	
E	Honda Manufacturing of Indiana	Greensburg, Indiana, United States	Honda Civic; Honda CR-V	2008	
B	Honda Manufacturing of Alabama	Lincoln, Alabama, United States	Honda Odyssey; Honda Pilot; Honda Passport; Honda Ridgeline	2001	
A	American Honda Motor Company (Marysville Auto Plant)	Marysville, Ohio, United States	Honda Accord; Acura Integra	1982	The first American Honda plant.
K	Honda Automoveis Brasil	Itirapina, São Paulo, Brazil	Honda City; Honda HR-V; Honda WR-V	2019	
J	Honda Karawang Plant	Karawang, Indonesia	Honda Brio; Honda BR-V; Honda HR-V; Honda WR-V	2003	
	Honda Cars India	Greater Noida, Uttar Pradesh, India	Honda Amaze; Honda City; Honda Elevate	1995	
	Honda Prachinburi Plant	Si Maha Phot, Prachinburi, Thailand	Honda Accord; Honda Avancier; Honda City; Honda City Hatchback; Honda Civic; Honda CR-V; Honda HR-V	2016	
S	Honda Suzuka Plant	Suzuka, Mie, Japan	Honda Fit; Honda N-Box; Honda N-One; Honda N-Van; Honda N-WGN	1960	
X	Honda Yorii Plant	Yorii, Saitama, Japan	Honda Civic; Honda Civic Type R Honda Freed; Honda Prelude; Honda Stepwgn; Honda Vezel; Honda ZR-V	2013	
M	Honda Celaya Plant	Celaya, Mexico	Honda HR-V	2014	
F	Honda Taiwan	Pingtung County, Taiwan	Honda CR-V; Honda HR-V; Honda Fit	2002	
