= Honda Avancier =

Honda Avancier is a nameplate used by two different Honda vehicles. The name was first used from 1999 to 2002 on a mid-size station wagon based on the sixth-generation Accord. The nameplate was revived for usage on a China-only mid-size crossover SUV produced by Guangqi Honda in 2016.

Vehicles using the nameplate are:

- Honda Avancier (station wagon), a mid-size station wagon produced from 1999 to 2003.
- Honda Avancier (crossover), a mid-size crossover SUV produced since 2016.
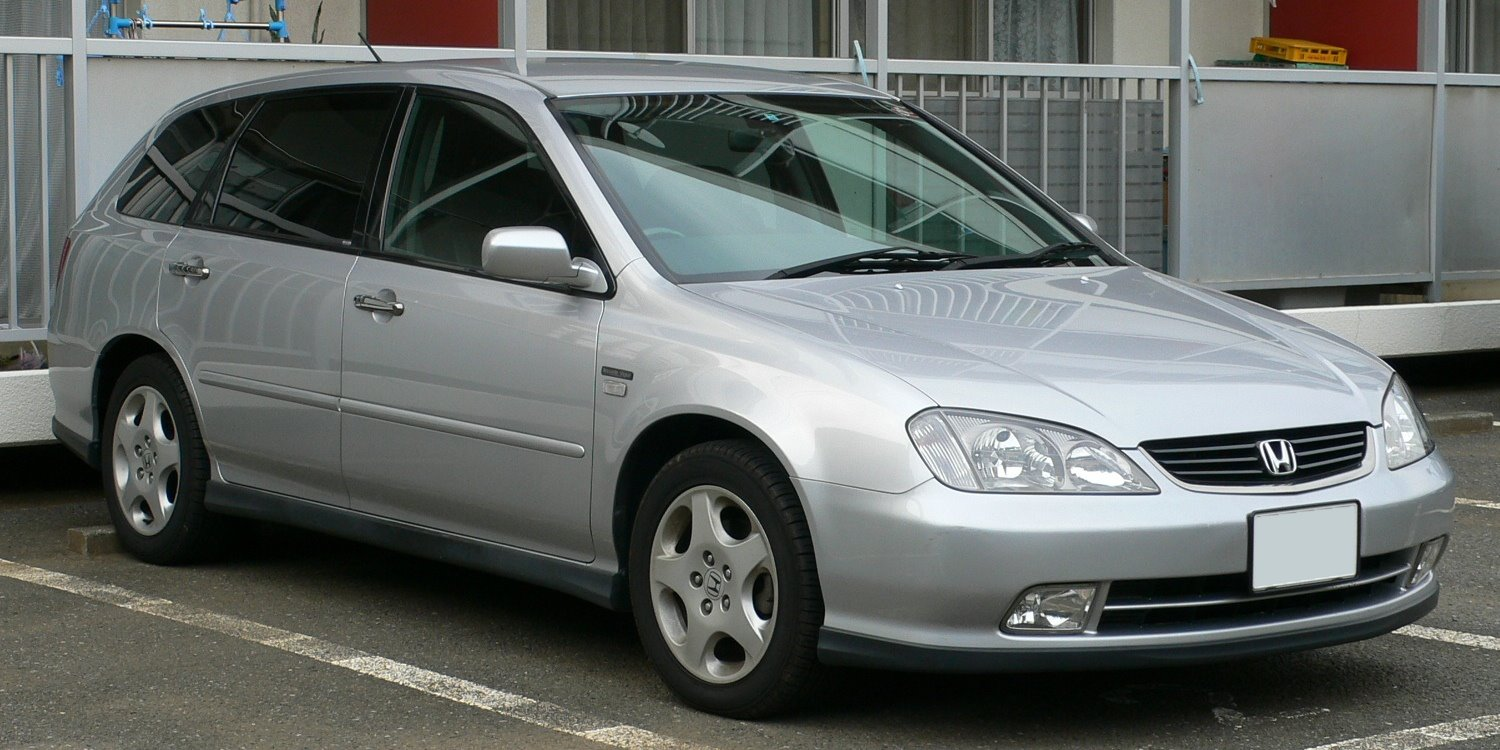
1997–2002 Honda Avancier

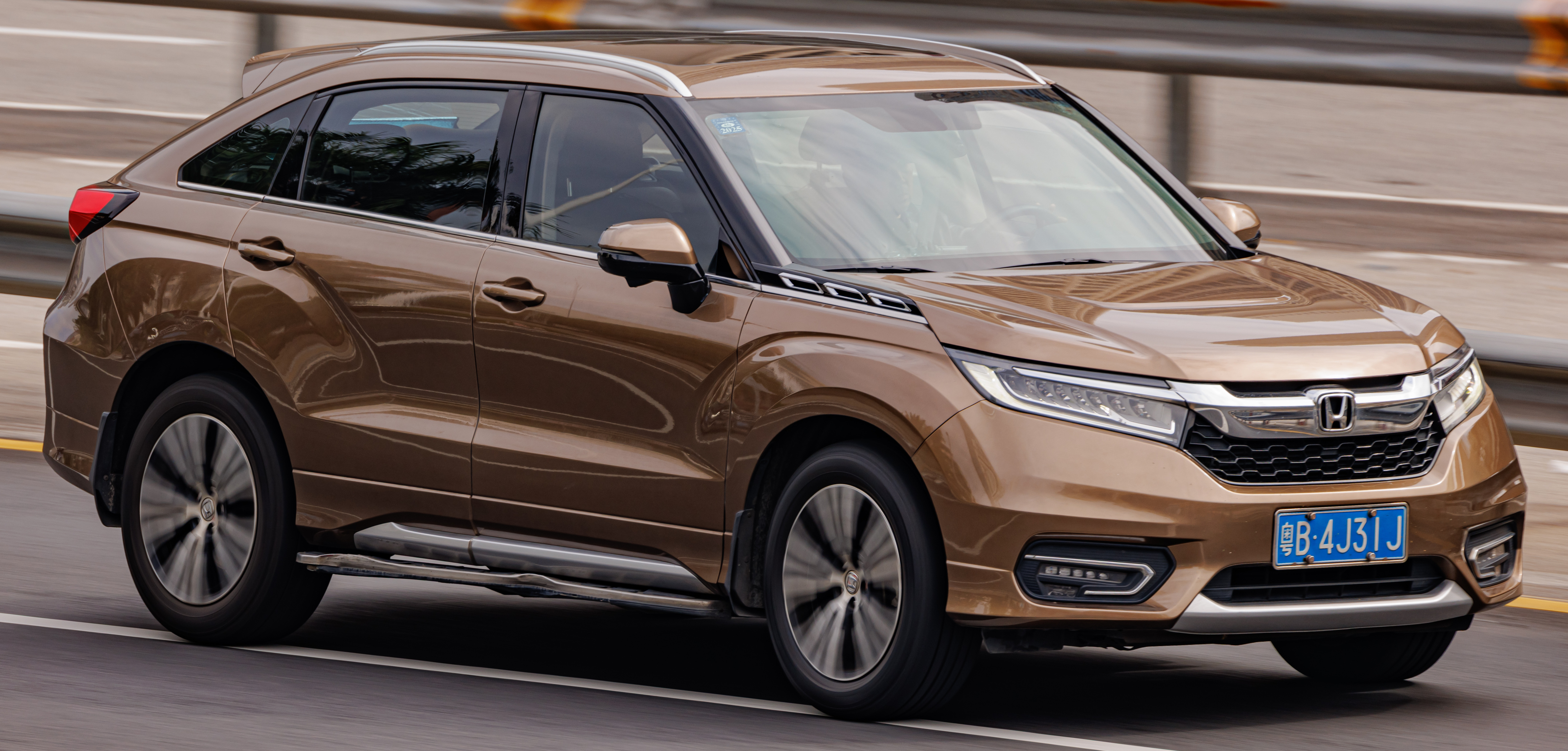
2016–present Honda Avancier
