= Honda Ye =

Chinese electric brand series by Honda

- Native name: 本田烨
- Industry: Automotive
- Founded: 2024; 2 years ago
- Founder: Honda
- Area served: China
- Products: Battery electric vehicles (BEVs)
- Parent: Honda
- Website: honda.com.cn

Honda Ye (Chinese: 本田烨) is a series of battery electric vehicles produced by the Japanese automobile manufacturer Honda, which is built for the Chinese market. Launched in 2024, the Ye sub-brand is part of Honda's broader strategy to introduce 10 electric vehicle models in China by 2027, six of which will be under the Ye sub-brand. The name "Ye" (烨) translates to "shine brilliantly" in Chinese, reflecting the brand's focus on innovation and sustainability.

== History ==
Honda unveiled the Ye sub-brand at the Auto China exhibition in April 2024. The launch marked Honda's commitment to expanding its electric vehicle offerings in China, one of the world's largest markets for electric vehicles. The Ye brand will produce and market its vehicles through Honda's joint ventures in China, GAC Honda and Dongfeng Honda.

The first models under the Ye brand, the P7 and S7, were introduced in 2024, with the GT concept set to follow in 2025.

== Models ==
Honda Ye's product lineup focuses on electric vehicles tailored to the Chinese market. The following models have been announced:

=== Current models ===
- Honda P7 (2024–present): A mid-size electric SUV produced by GAC Honda.
- Honda S7 (2024–present): A mid-size electric SUV produced by Dongfeng Honda.

=== Upcoming models ===
- Honda GT (2025): A high-performance electric sedan concept unveiled at Auto China 2024.

== Gallery ==
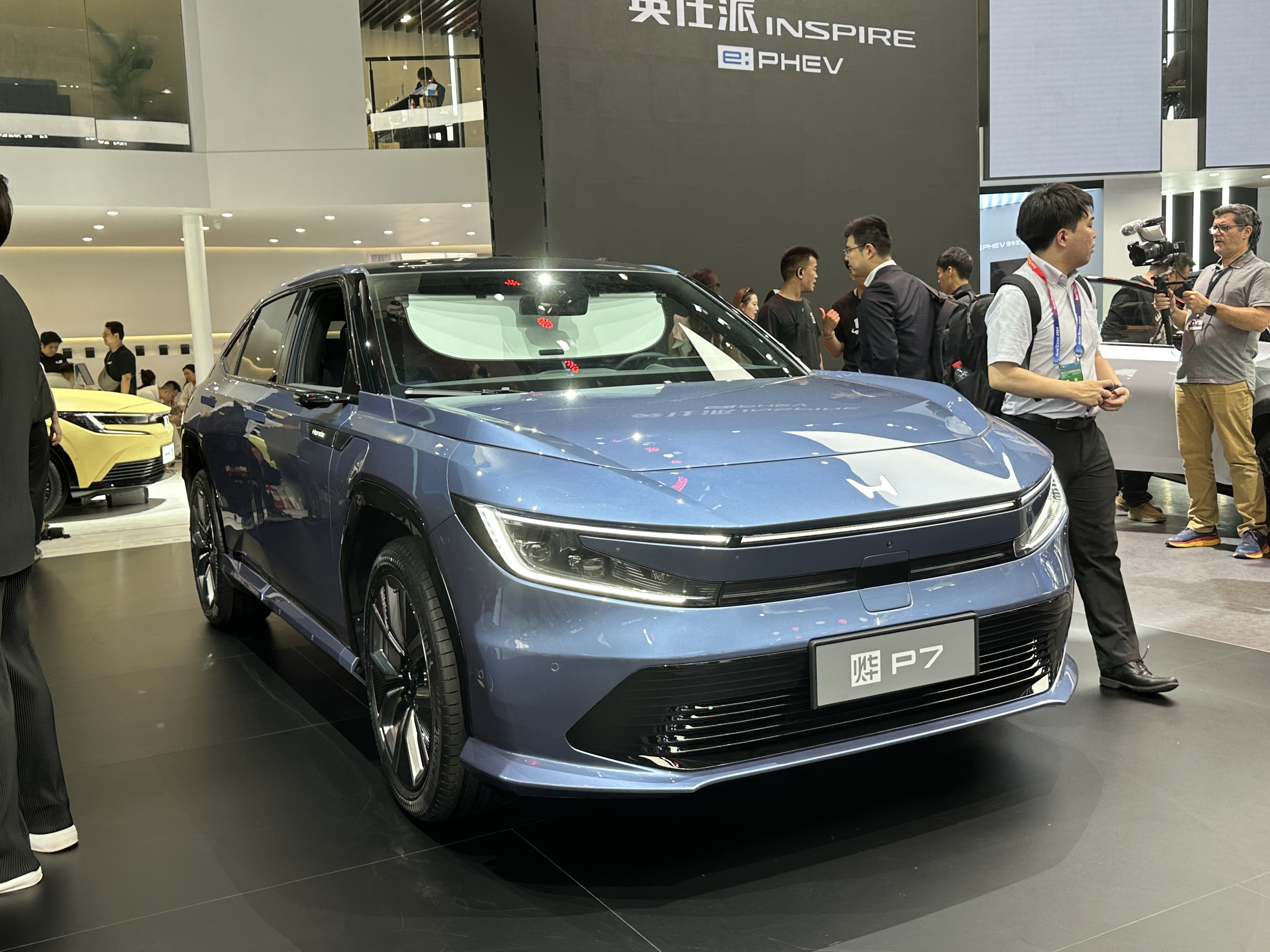
Honda P7

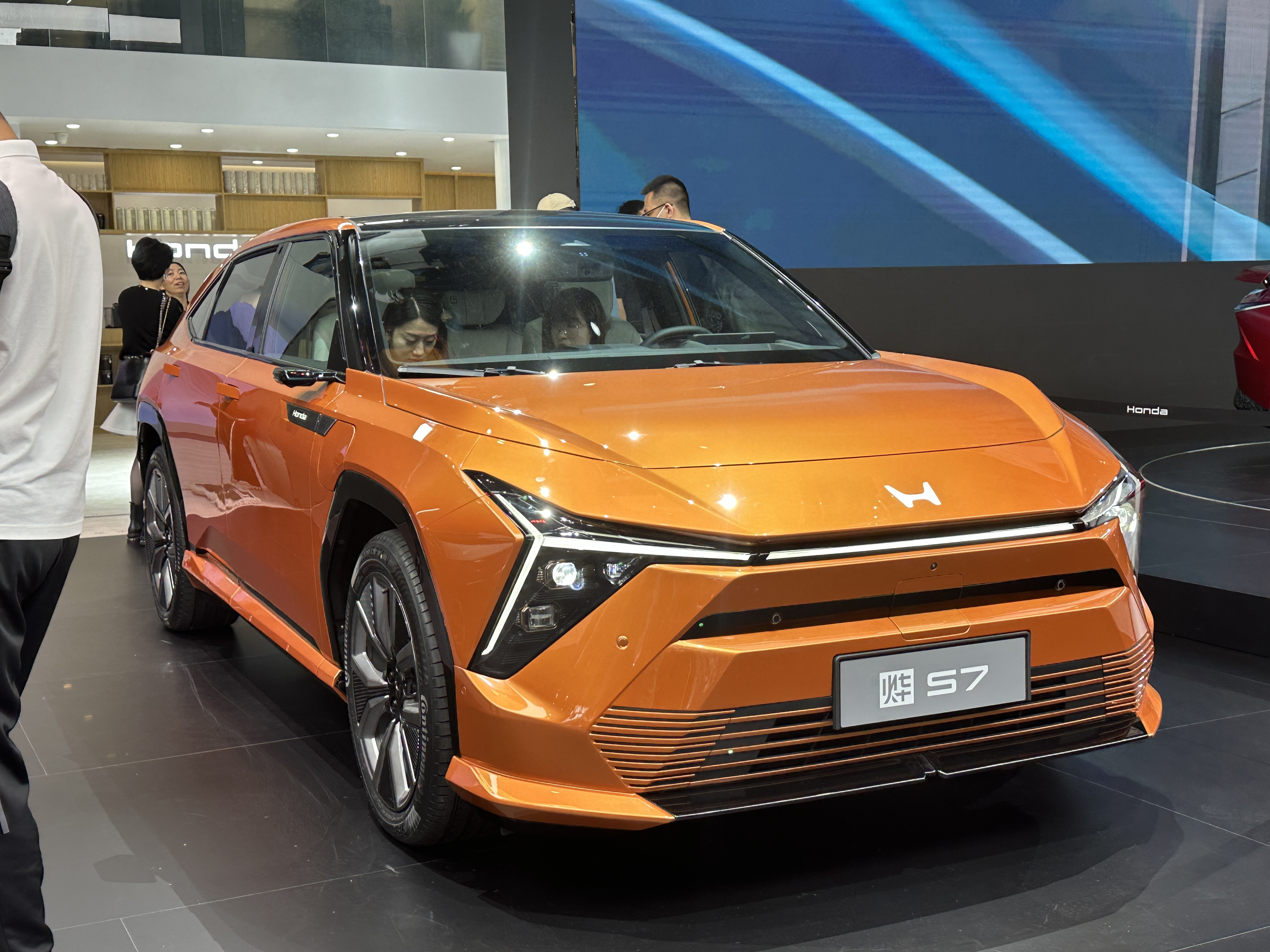
Honda S7

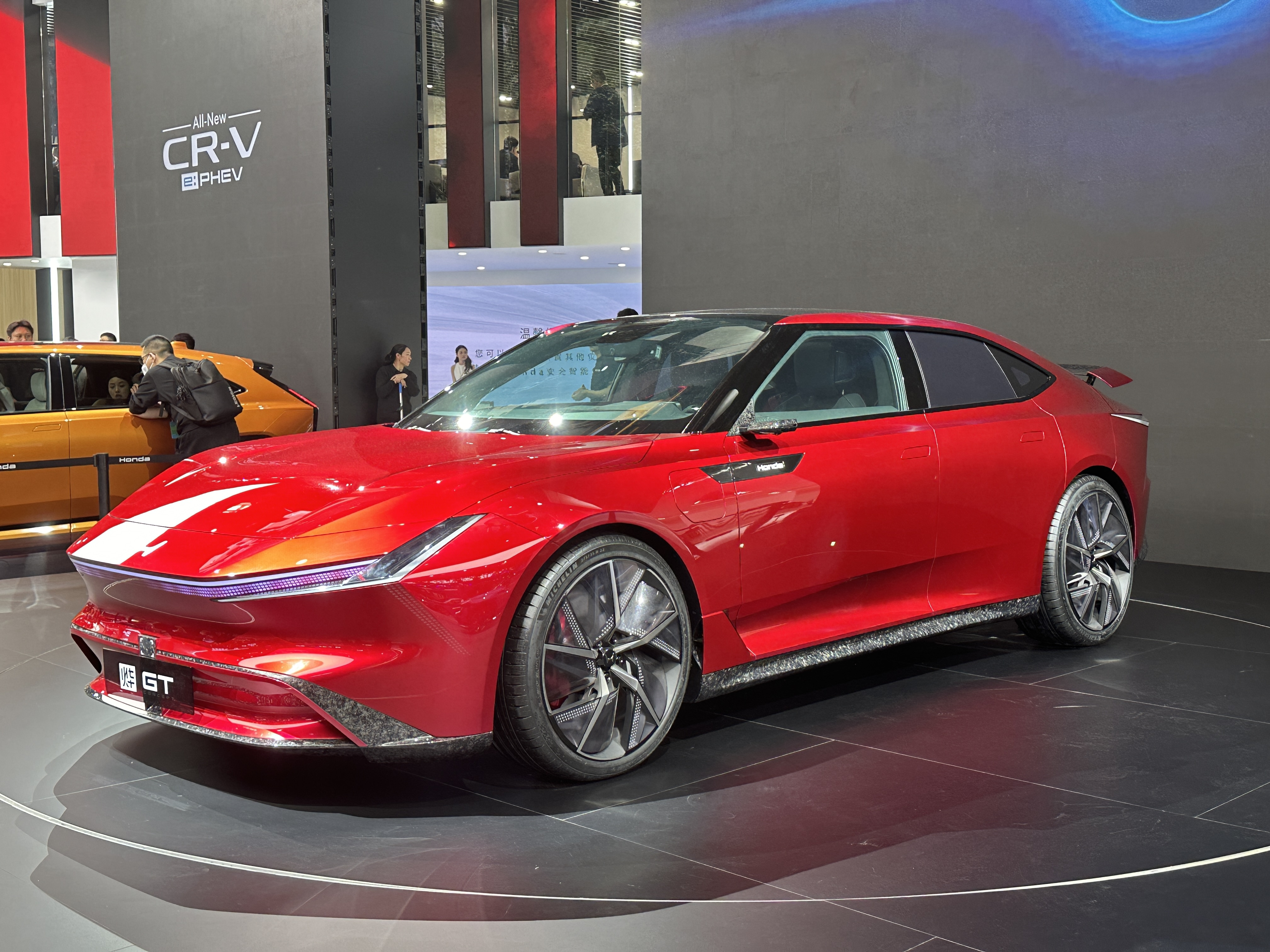
Honda Ye GT

== See also ==
- BMW i
- Honda Zero
- Audi e-tron
- Mercedes-EQ
- Toyota bZ
- Kia EV series
- Ioniq
- Volkswagen ID. series
