= Honda GT =

Battery electric mid-size sedan

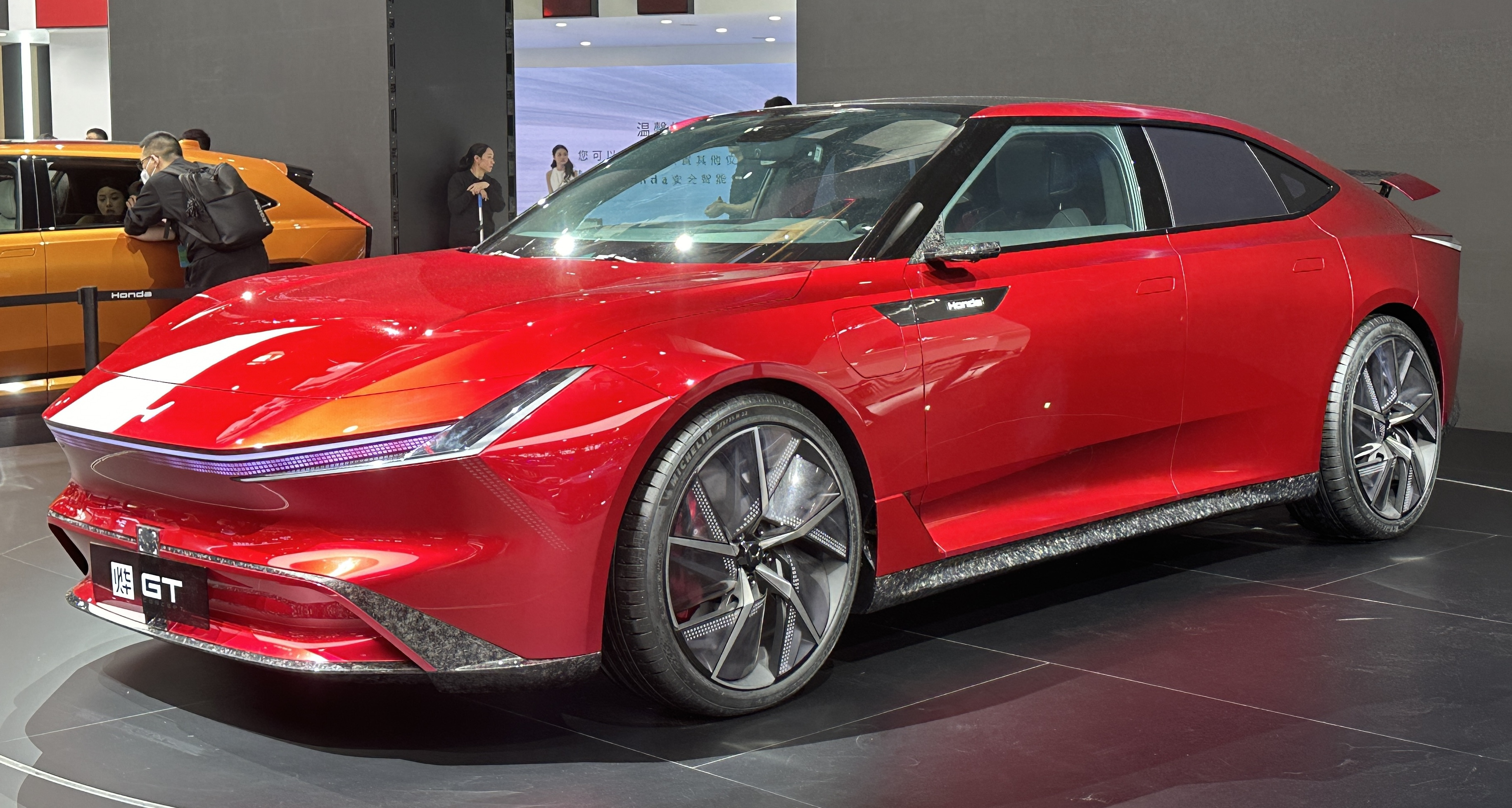
- Honda Ye GT Concept

Overview
- Manufacturer: Honda
- Also called: Honda Ye GT (pre-production)
- Production: 2026
- Assembly: China: Guangzhou (GAC Honda); China: Wuhan (Dongfeng Honda)

Body and chassis
- Class: Mid-size car (D)
- Body style: 4-door sedan
- Layout: Rear-motor, rear-wheel-drive
- Platform: Honda e:N Architecture W
- Related: Honda P7/S7

The Honda GT is a battery electric mid-size sedan produced by Honda. Marketed in China, the production version of the GT will be the second of the Honda Ye series of vehicles when it enters production in 2026.

== Overview ==
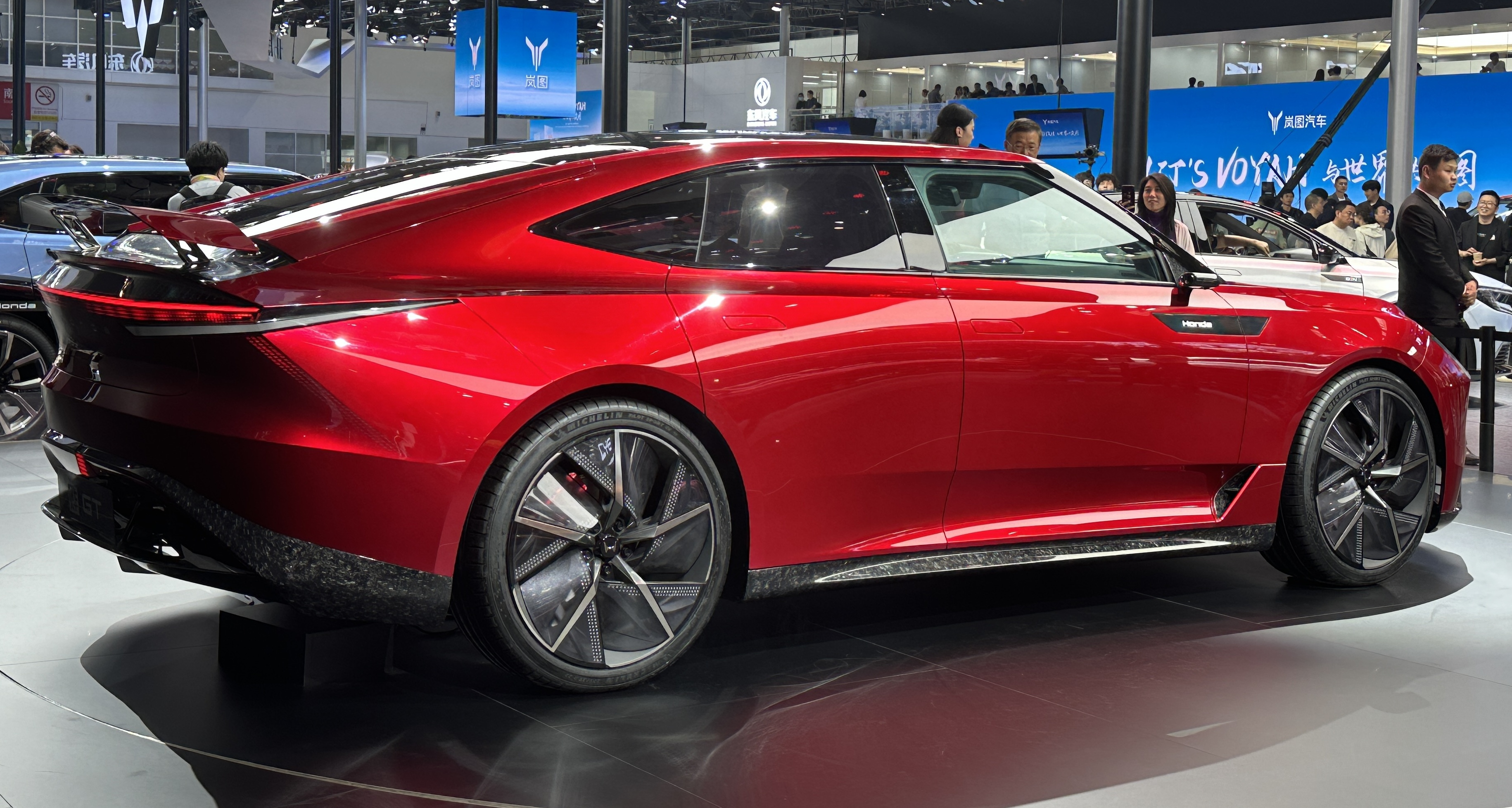
Rear view

At Auto China in April 2024, the Japanese manufacturer Honda presents its new line of BEV's and sub-brand Ye, whose models will be produced and marketed in China from 2024. The second model from the Ye series is the GT, and the production version of Auto Shanghai 2025, the vehicle is to be produced in 2025.
