= Honda Avancier (station wagon) =

Honda Avancier (TA1/2/3/4)
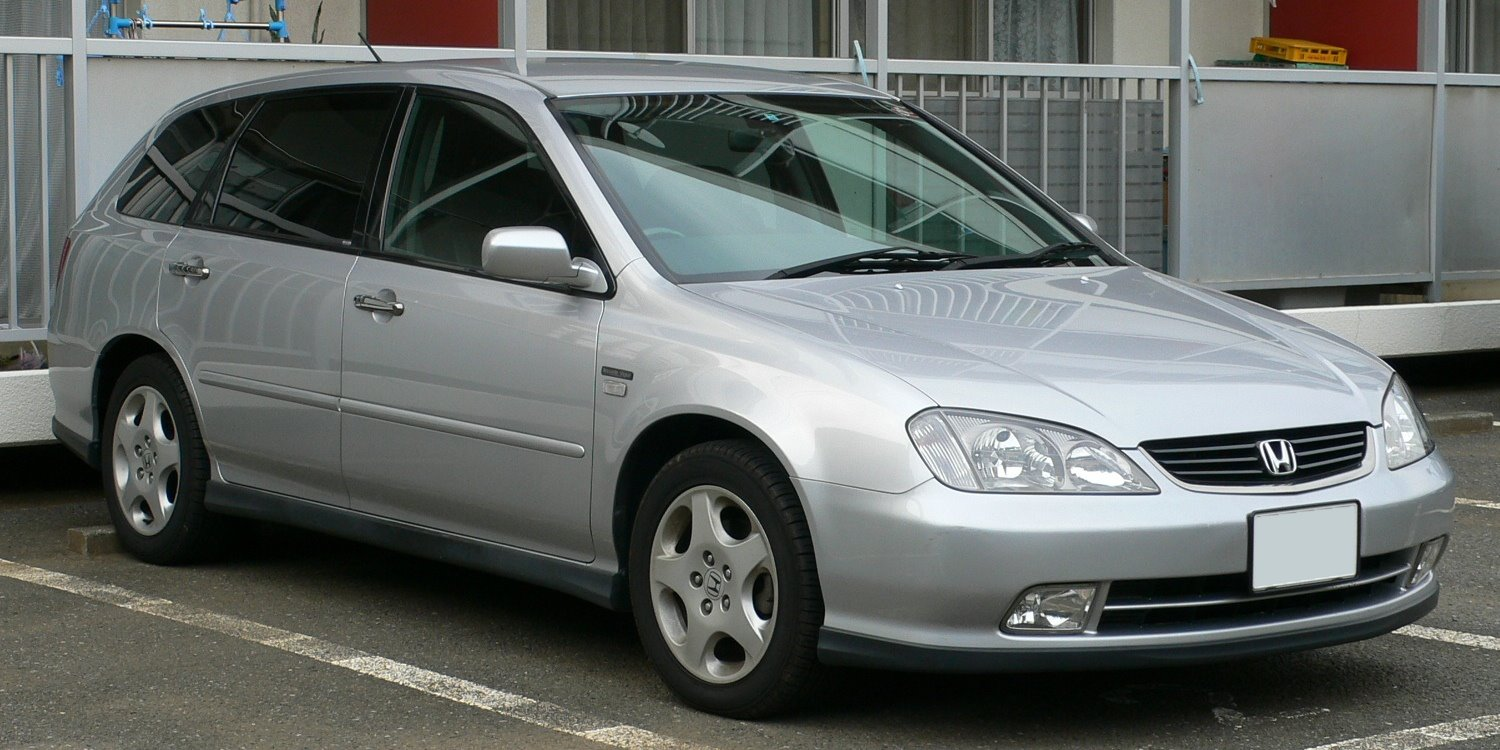
- 2001 Honda Avancier Nouvelle Vague (Japan)

Overview
- Manufacturer: Honda
- Production: 1999–2003
- Assembly: Japan: Sayama, Saitama

Body and chassis
- Class: Mid-size car
- Body style: 5-door station wagon
- Layout: Front-engine, front-wheel-drive; Front-engine, four-wheel-drive
- Related: Honda Accord (Japan-spec); Honda Odyssey (Japan-spec)

Powertrain
- Engine: 2.3 L F23A VTEC I4; 3.0 L J30A VTEC V6
- Power output: 110 kW (148 hp; 150 PS) (F23A); 160 kW (215 hp; 218 PS) (J30A)
- Transmission: 4-speed automatic (2.3 L); 5-speed automatic (3.0 L)

Dimensions
- Wheelbase: 2,765 mm (108.9 in)
- Length: 4,700–4,795 mm (185.0–188.8 in)
- Width: 1,790–1,810 mm (70.5–71.3 in))
- Height: 1,500–1,545 mm (59.1–60.8 in)
- Curb weight: 1,500–1,690 kg (3,310–3,730 lb)

The Honda Avancier (Japanese: ホンダ・アヴァンシア, Hepburn: Honda Avanshia) is a mid-size station wagon produced by the Japanese automobile manufacturer Honda. It is based on the sixth-generation Accord.

== Overview ==
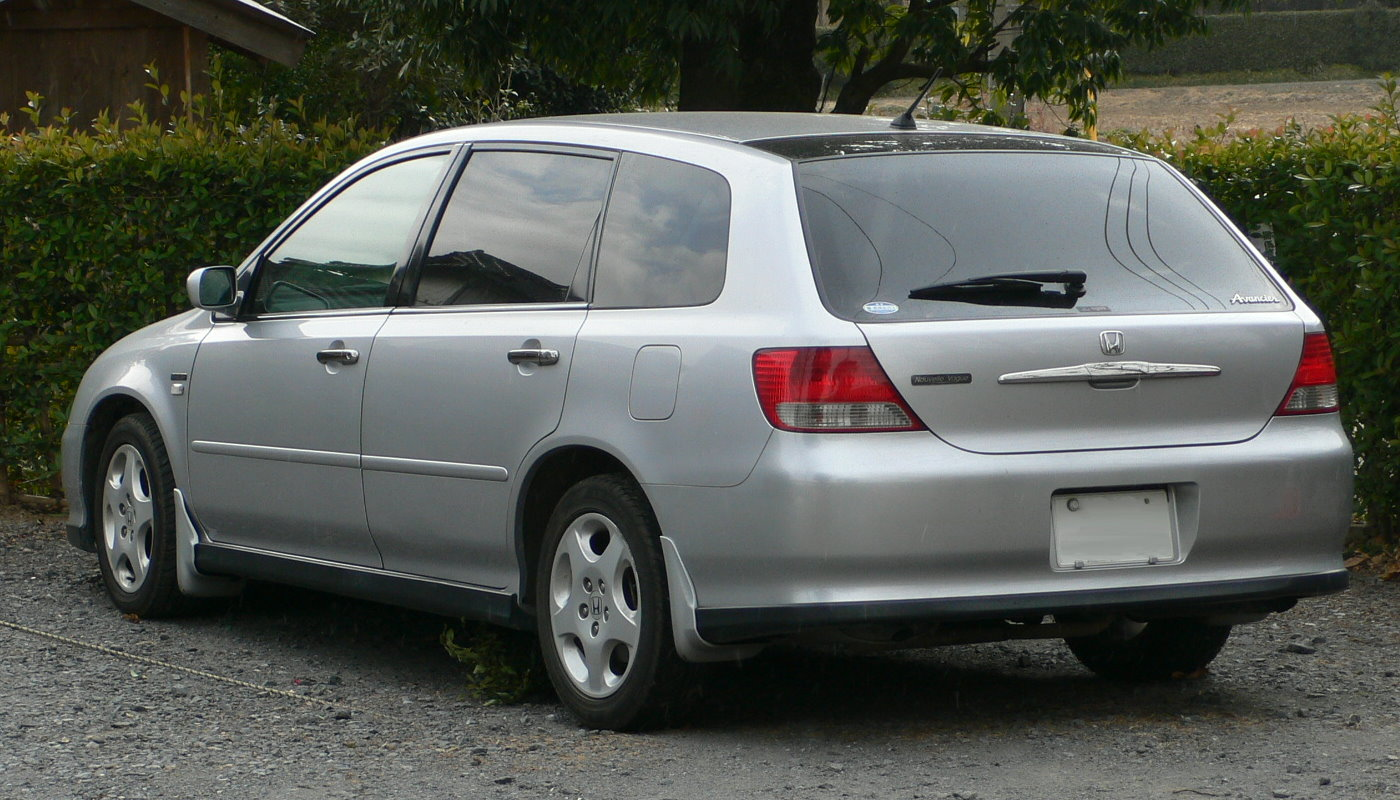
Rear view

Upon its introduction in 1999, the Avancier was available with a 2.3-litre F23A VTEC four-cylinder engine producing 110 kW (148 hp; 150 PS) mated to a 4-speed automatic transmission or a 3.0-litre J30A VTEC V6 engine producing 160 kW (215 hp; 218 PS) mated to a 5-speed automatic transmission. It can be had with a front-wheel drive or the Honda's real-time four-wheel drive system. The V6-engined Avancier can be optioned with an "Intelligent Highway Cruise Control" (IHCC) that used a radar to determine and maintain a reliable distance with the car in front and capable to maintain a speed. Due to the large engine displacements, the Avancier was considered as a mid-size wagon in Japan instead of a compact wagon. The dimensions also contribute to such classification in Japan.

As for the interior, the front seats were designed with a walk-through layout, which allowed for easier access to the adjacent and rear seats. The B-pillar featured dedicated air vents and a ceiling-mounted box for the rear seats. The optional "G Package" included a rear seat center table with a stowable seat cushion, a rear seat slide function (with a slide range of 70 mm), adjustable seat backs, and rear privacy glass, enhancing the focus on rear seat comfort.

The vehicle's design aimed to provide a spacious interior with a focus on luxury rather than functionality, representing an innovative approach at the time of its release. However, its overall appearance sometimes made it challenging to convey a clear sense of premium quality.

When the Accord underwent a full model change, the production of the Avancier ceased in 2003.
