= Honda P7 =

Battery electric mid-size crossover SUVs

Honda P7/S7
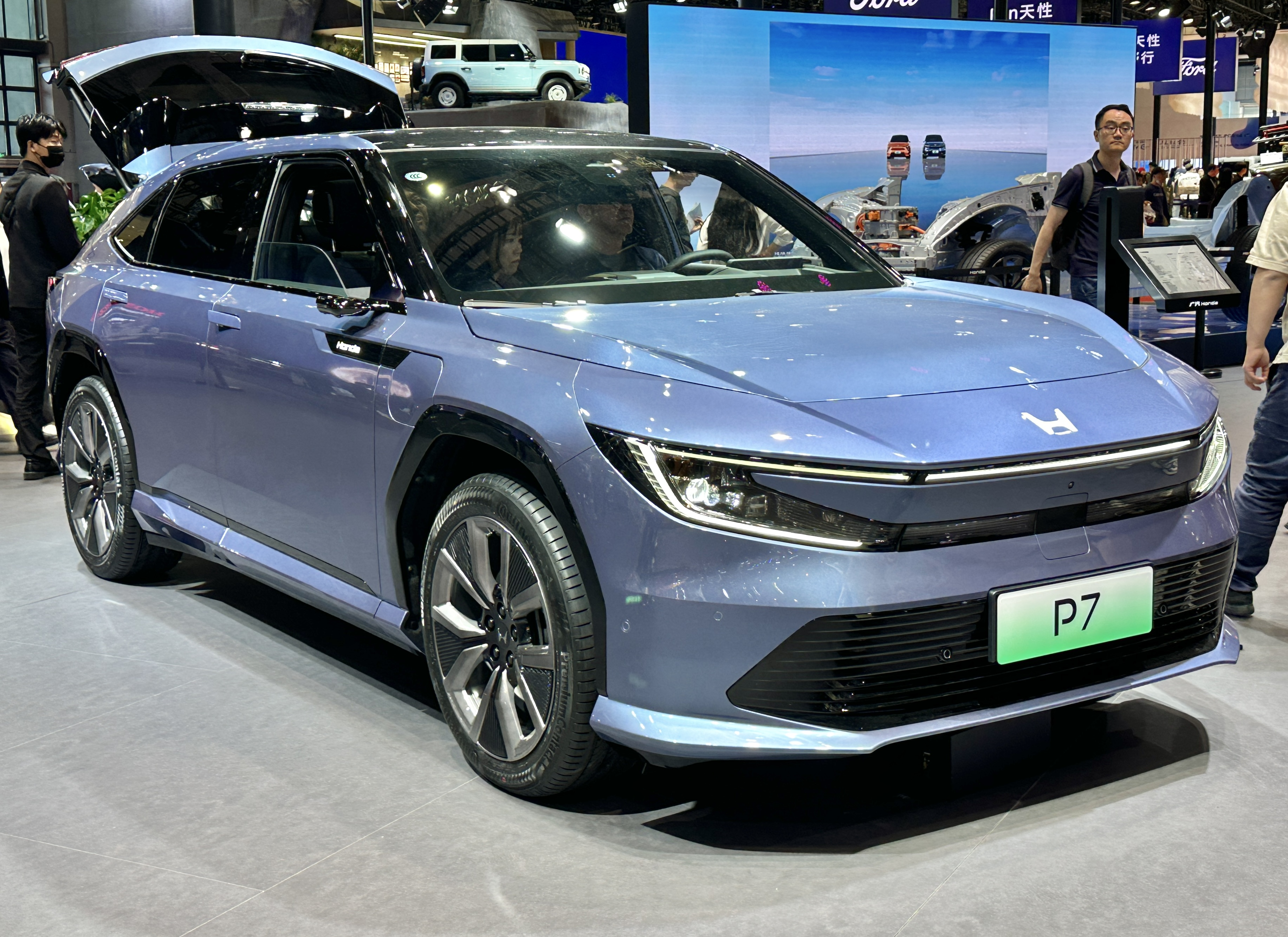
- Honda P7

Overview
- Manufacturer: Honda
- Also called: Honda Ye P7/S7 (pre-production)
- Production: February 2025 – present (S7); March 2025 – present (P7)
- Assembly: China: Guangzhou (GAC Honda, P7); China: Wuhan (Dongfeng Honda, S7)

Body and chassis
- Class: Mid-size crossover SUV (D)
- Body style: 5-door SUV
- Layout: Dual-motors, four-wheel-drive
- Platform: Honda e:N Architecture W
- Related: Honda GT

Powertrain
- Power output: 200–350 kW (270–470 hp; 270–480 PS)
- Battery: 89.8 kWh NMC CATL
- Electric range: 620–650 km (390–400 mi)

Dimensions
- Wheelbase: 2,930 mm (115.4 in)
- Length: 4,750 mm (187.0 in)
- Width: 1,930 mm (76.0 in)
- Height: 1,625 mm (64.0 in)
- Curb weight: 2,305 kg (5,082 lb)

The Honda P7 and Honda S7 are battery electric mid-size crossover SUVs produced by Honda, through its respective joint ventures GAC Honda and Dongfeng Honda. Both vehicles are marketed solely in China. They are the first members of the Honda Ye series of vehicles.

== Overview ==
In April 2023 at the Auto Shanghai, the models are previewed concept vehicles named the Honda e:N SUV. At the Auto China in April 2024, the Japanese manufacturer Honda presents its new line of BEV's and sub-brand Ye, whose models will be produced and marketed in China from 2024. The first two models from the Ye series are the P7 and S7, both to be produced through the Honda's respective joint ventures GAC Honda and Dongfeng Honda. Before launch, Honda decided to abandon the Ye branding after negative public reception of the brand's name.

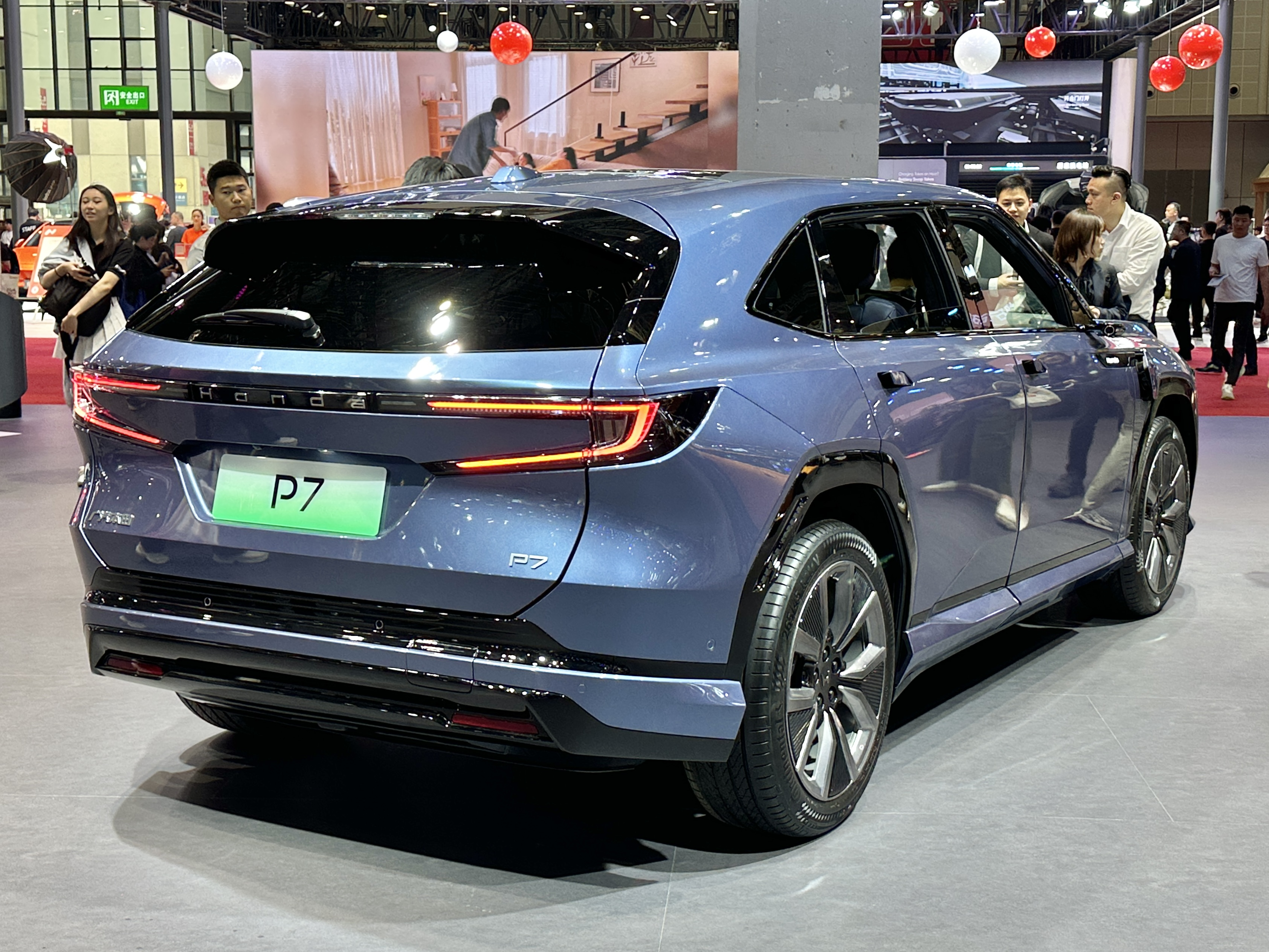
Rear view

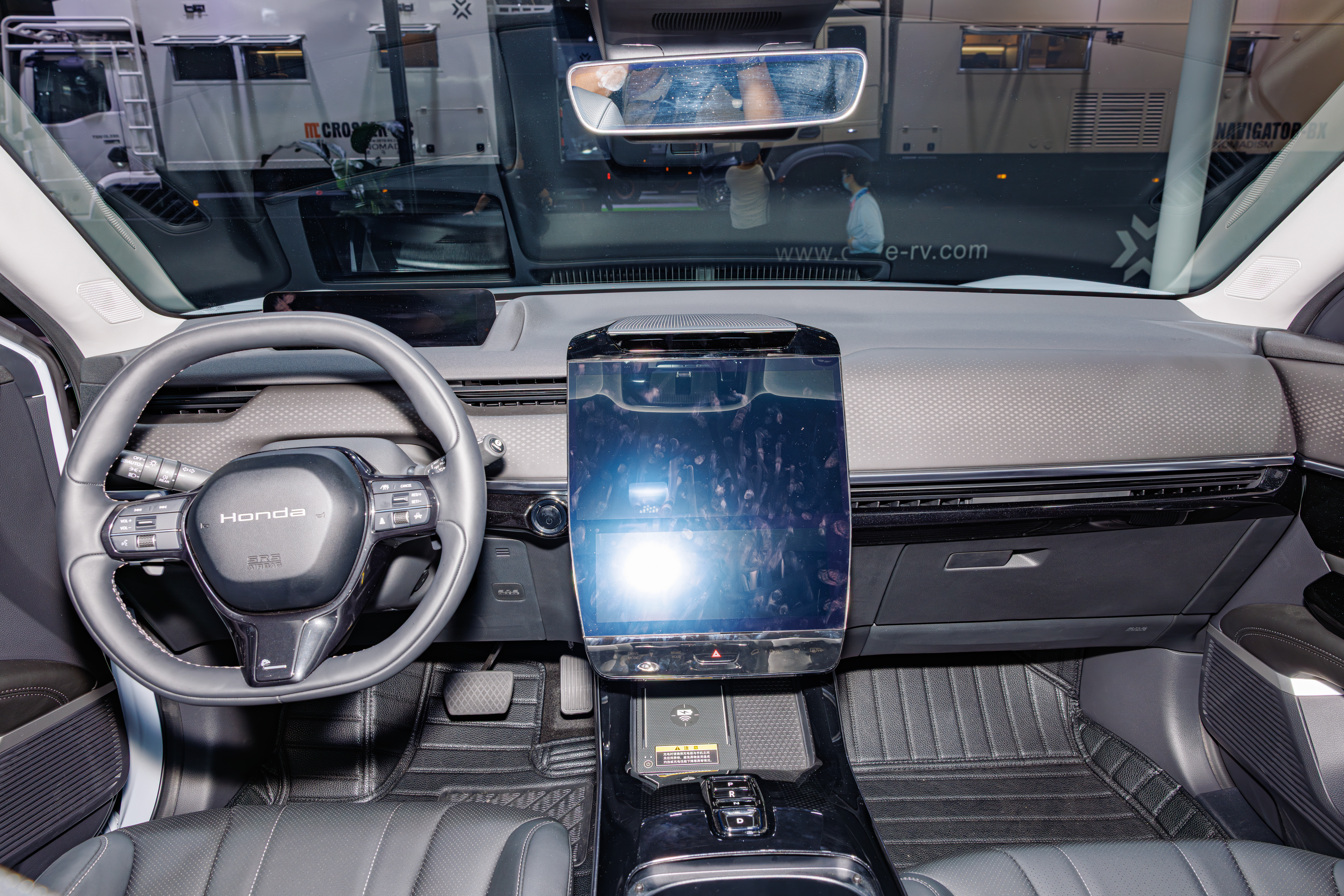
Interior

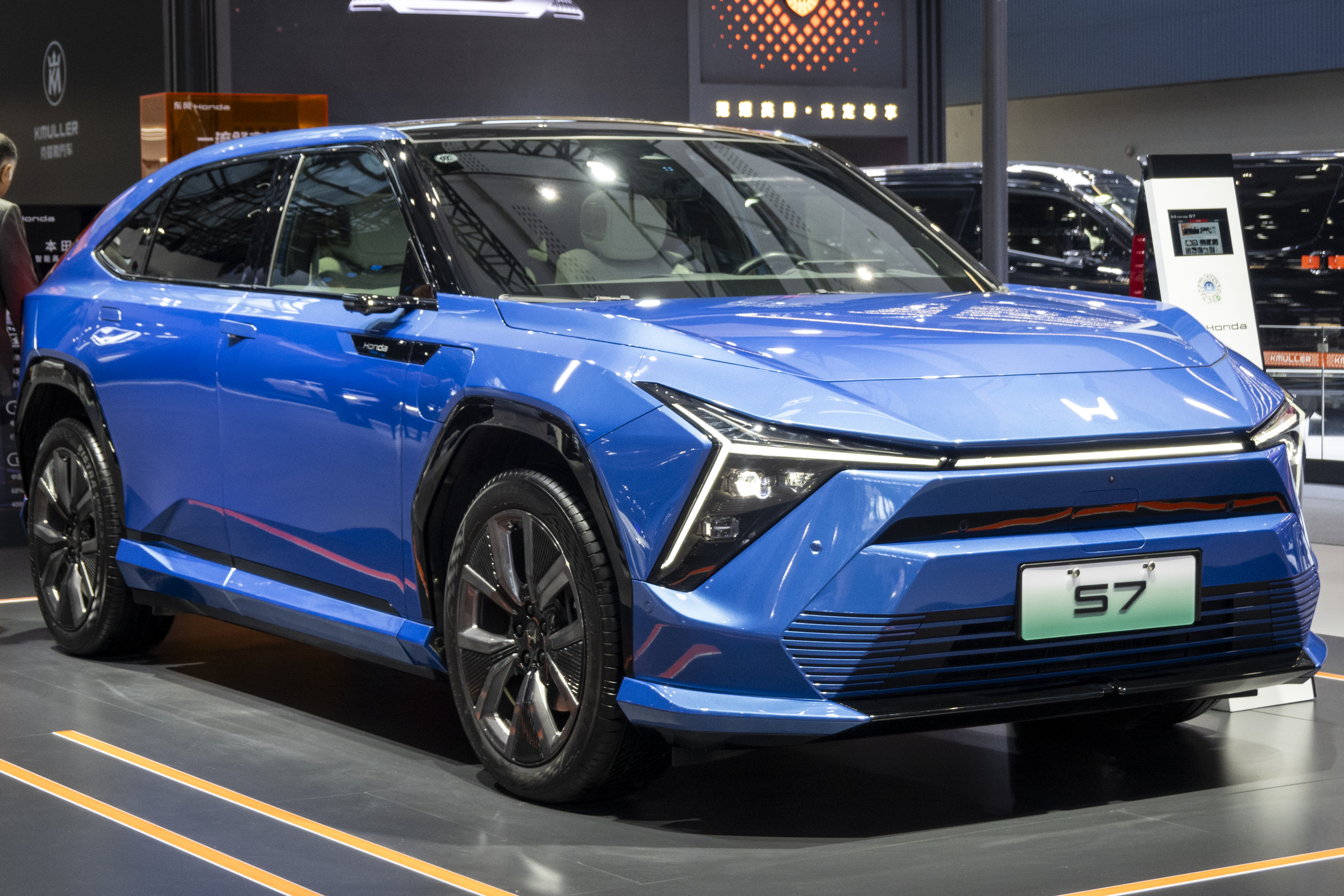
Honda S7

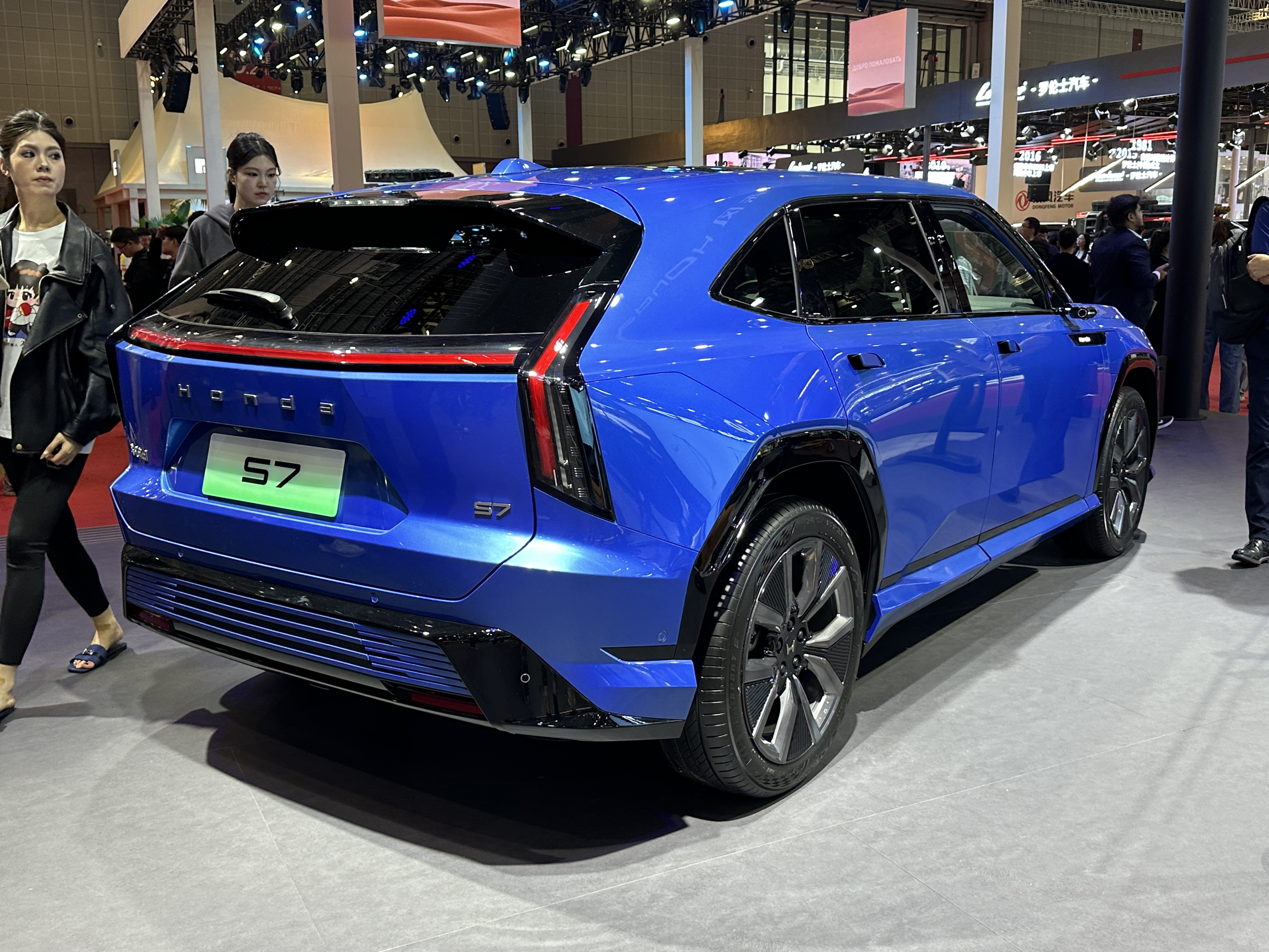
Rear view

== Specifications ==
The vehicles are differentiated by their styling, with the GAC Honda P7 has rounder lighting elements, while the Dongfeng Honda S7 features a sportier front and rear bumper and angular lights.

The P7 and S7 are equipped with a large 24-inch vertical central control screen, an 9.9-inch LCD instrument panel, optional digital sideview mirrors, a digital rearview mirror, and a 21.9-inch AR-HUD, while the manufacturer decided to retain physical buttons. The two vehicles also offer a panoramic sunroof with adjustable light transmission. The front seats in the two crossovers include integrated Bose speakers in the headrests, and there is also a smart voice assistant in the entertainment system.

Additionally, the P7 and S7 features a powerful powertrain, a high-capacity, high-density battery, all-wheel drive, wishbone front suspension and a five-link rear suspension. The vehicles have a 200 kW (270 hp; 270 PS) rear motor, which can be supplemented by an additional 150 kW (201 hp; 204 PS) front motor for a combined 350 kW (470 hp; 480 PS) all-wheel drive setup. Power is supplied by a 89.8 kWh NMC battery pack supplied by CATL, for a CLTC range rating of 650 kilometres (400 mi) for rear-wheel drive, and 620 kilometres (390 mi) for all wheel drive models.

== Sales ==
| Year | China | | |
| Year | P7 | S7 | Total |
|---|---|---|---|
| 2025 | 3,825 | 2,036 | 5,861 |
