= Honda Avancier (crossover) =

Mid-size SUV

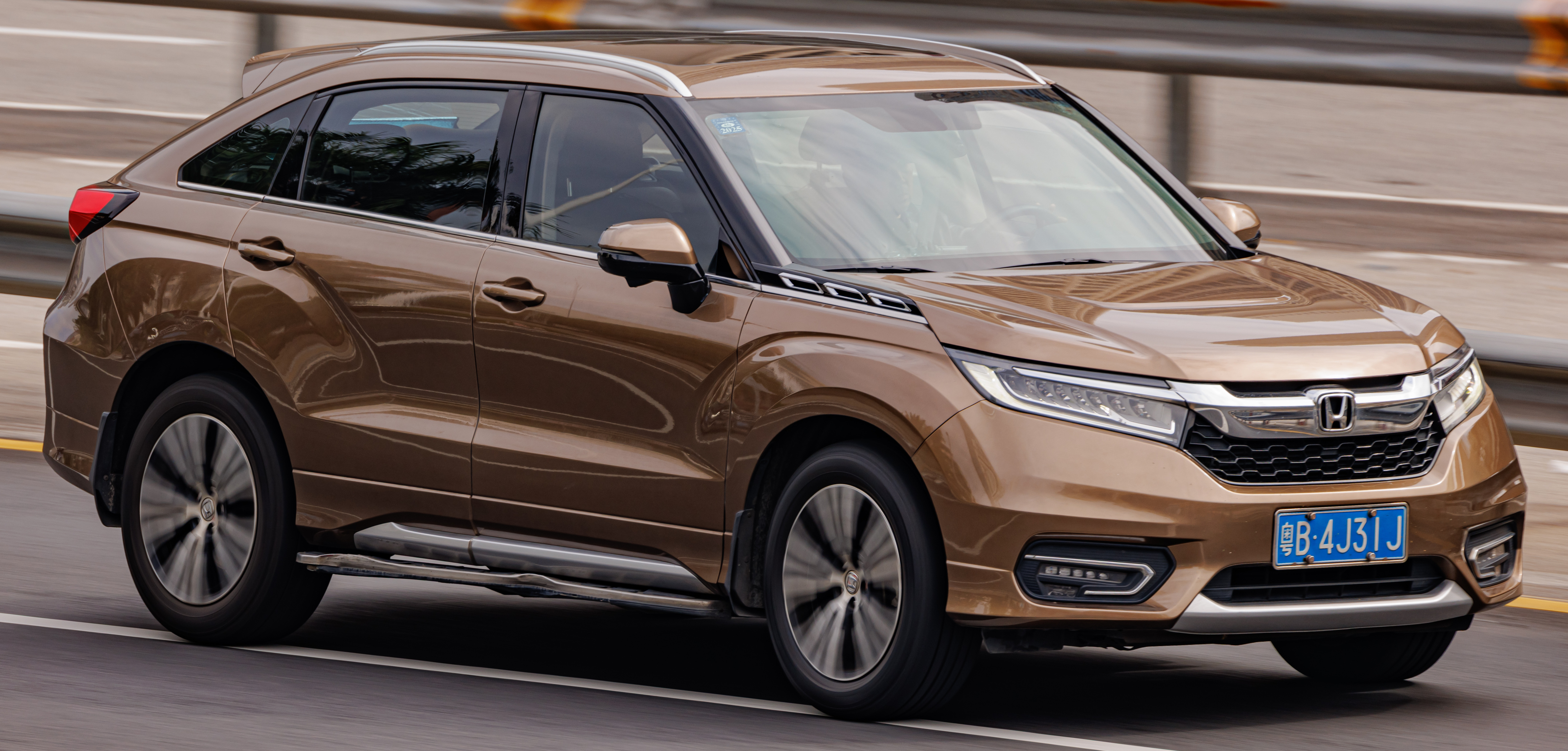
- First-generation Honda Avancier (pre-facelift)

Overview
- Manufacturer: Honda
- Also called: Honda UR-V (China, Dongfeng Honda)
- Production: 2016–present

Body and chassis
- Class: Mid-size SUV
- Body style: 5-door crossover SUV
- Chassis: Unibody

Chronology
- Predecessor: Honda Crosstour (China)

The Honda Avancier (Japanese: ホンダ・アヴァンシア, Hepburn: Honda Avanshia) is a series of mid-size SUVs produced by Japanese manufacturer Honda since 2016. The first generation is produced exclusively in China by GAC Honda since late 2016, and by Dongfeng Honda as the UR-V since March 2017. The second generation is a three-row SUV built in Thailand for the Southeast Asian, Japanese and Australian markets and scheduled to debut in December 2026.

== First generation (TG; 2016) ==
First generation
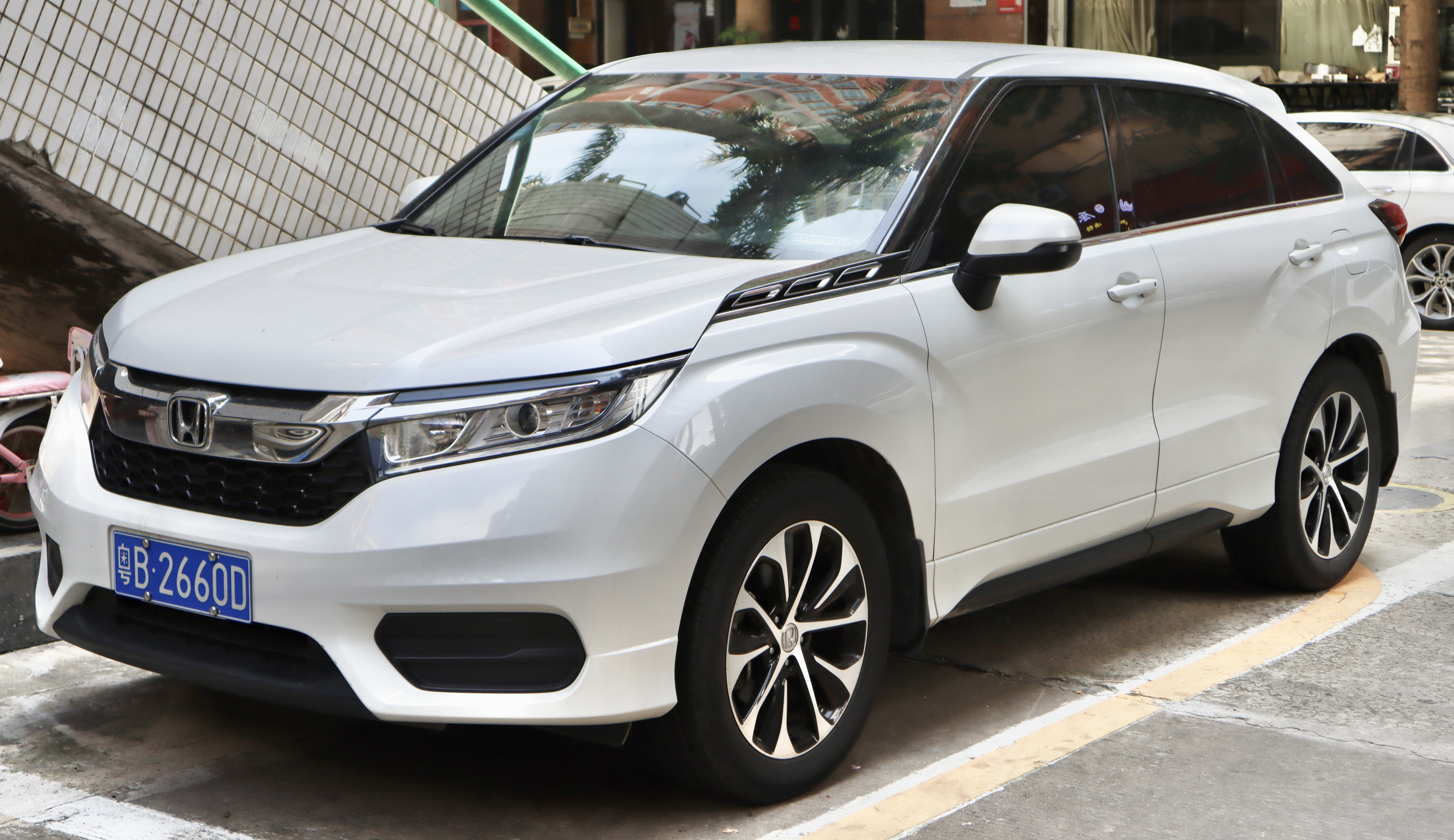
- Honda Avancier (pre-facelift)

Overview
- Model code: TG1/2/3/4/5/6
- Also called: Honda UR-V (Dongfeng Honda)
- Production: 2016–present
- Assembly: China: Guangzhou (Avancier; Guangqi Honda); Wuhan (UR-V; Dongfeng Honda)

Body and chassis
- Layout: Front-engine, front-wheel-drive; Front-engine, four-wheel-drive (2.0 L)
- Platform: Global Light Truck Platform 2 (GLTP2)
- Related: Acura MDX (third generation)

Powertrain
- Engine: Petrol: 1.5 L L15B7 Earth Dreams VTEC Turbo I4-T; 2.0 L K20C3 Earth Dreams VTEC Turbo I4-T
- Power output: 144 kW (193 hp; 196 PS) (L15B7); 200 kW (268 hp; 272 PS) (K20C3)
- Transmission: CVT (1.5 L); 9-speed ZF 9HP automatic (2.0 L)

Dimensions
- Wheelbase: 2,820 mm (111.0 in)
- Length: 4,816 mm (189.6 in) (Avancier); 4,825 mm (190.0 in) (UR-V)
- Width: 1,942 mm (76.5 in)
- Height: 1,669 mm (65.7 in)
- Curb weight: 1,708–1,881 kg (3,765–4,147 lb)

=== Overview ===
The first prototype of Avancier was displayed at the 2015 Auto Shanghai and debuted as the Concept D. Honda debuted a prototype version of the Avancier during the April 2016 Auto China and then during the September 2016 Chengdu Auto Show, to be marketed solely in China in October 2016. It is positioned above the CR-V and is currently sold as Honda's flagship SUV in China. The Honda Avancier is built on the same Global Light Truck Platform 2 (GLTP2) as the third-generation Acura MDX, which was produced from 2014 to 2020.

The Avancier is powered by either a 1.5 L L15B7 Earth Dreams VTEC Turbo inline-four engine producing 144 kW (193 hp; 196 PS) and 240 N⋅m (177 lbf⋅ft) of torque mated to a continuously variable transmission (badged as "240 Turbo") or a 2.0 L K20C3 Earth Dreams VTEC Turbo inline-four engine producing 200 kW (268 hp; 272 PS) and 370 N⋅m (273 lbf⋅ft) of torque mated to a ZF 9-speed automatic transmission (badged as "370 Turbo").

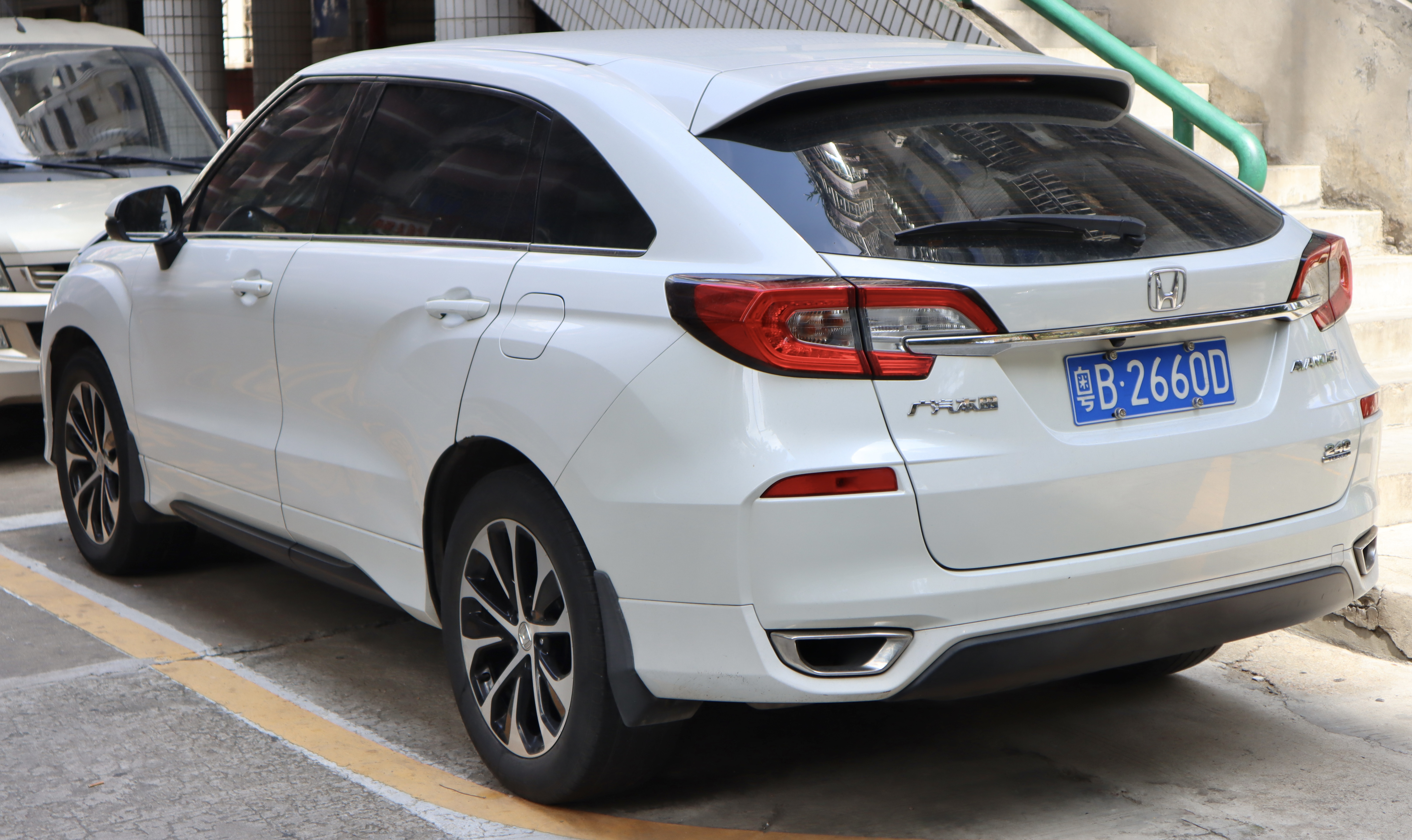
Avancier 240 Turbo rear view (pre-facelift)

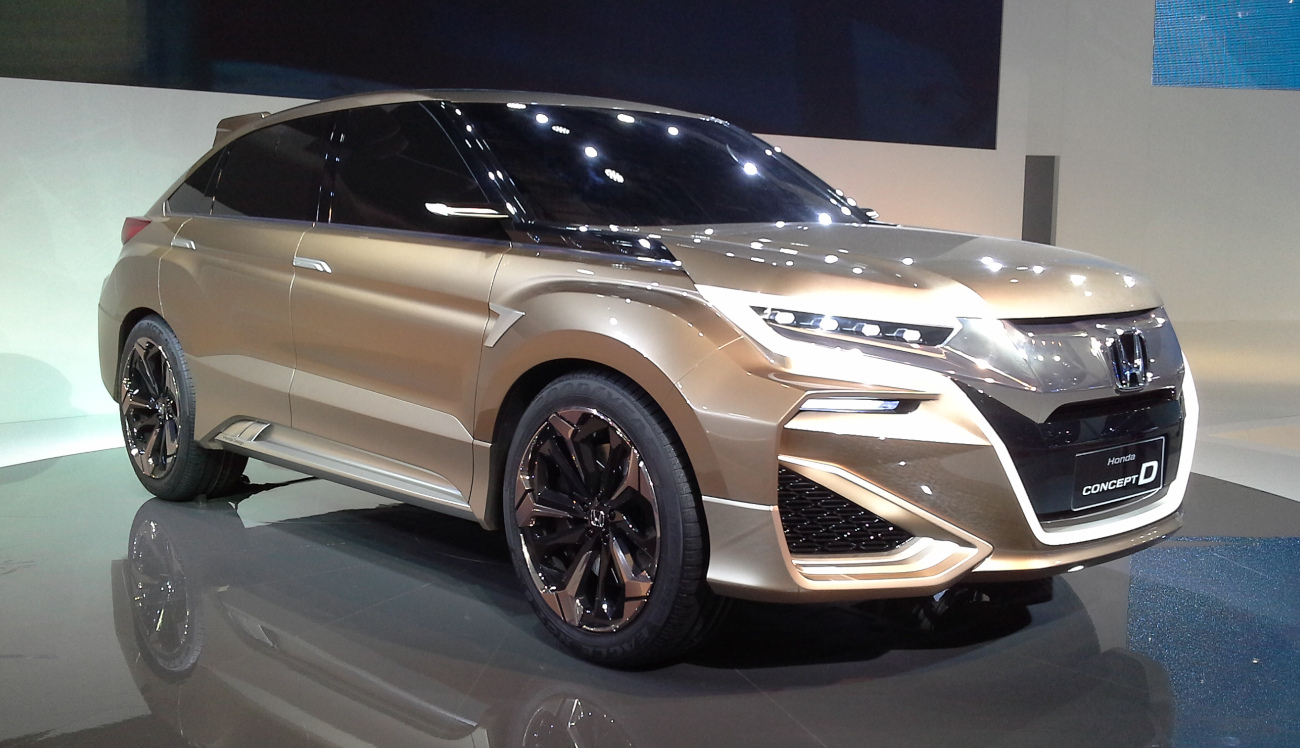
Honda Concept D

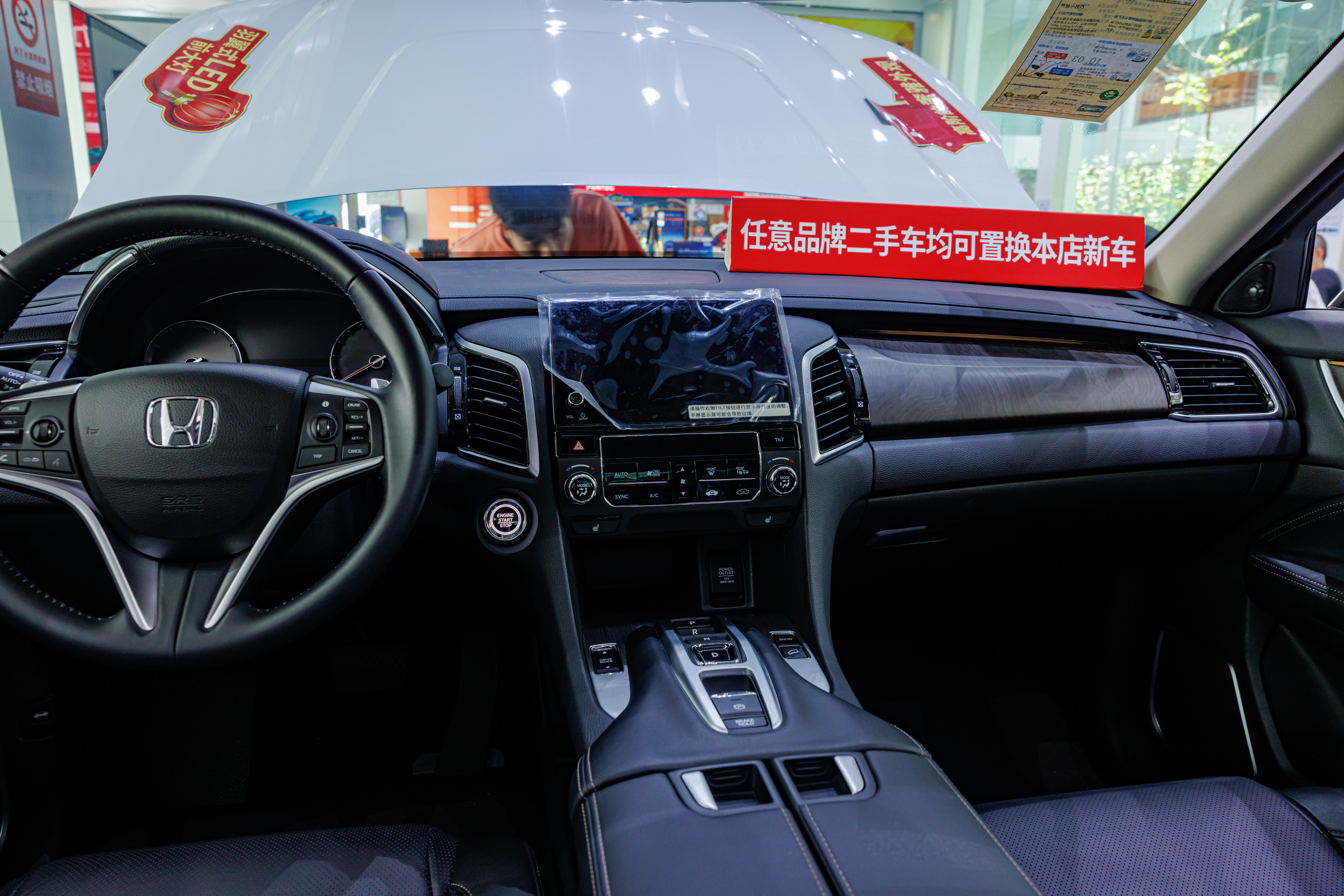
interior

==== 2020 facelift ====
The Avancier received a facelift in March 2020, updating the front and rear end designs and adding a 2-tone paint job option.

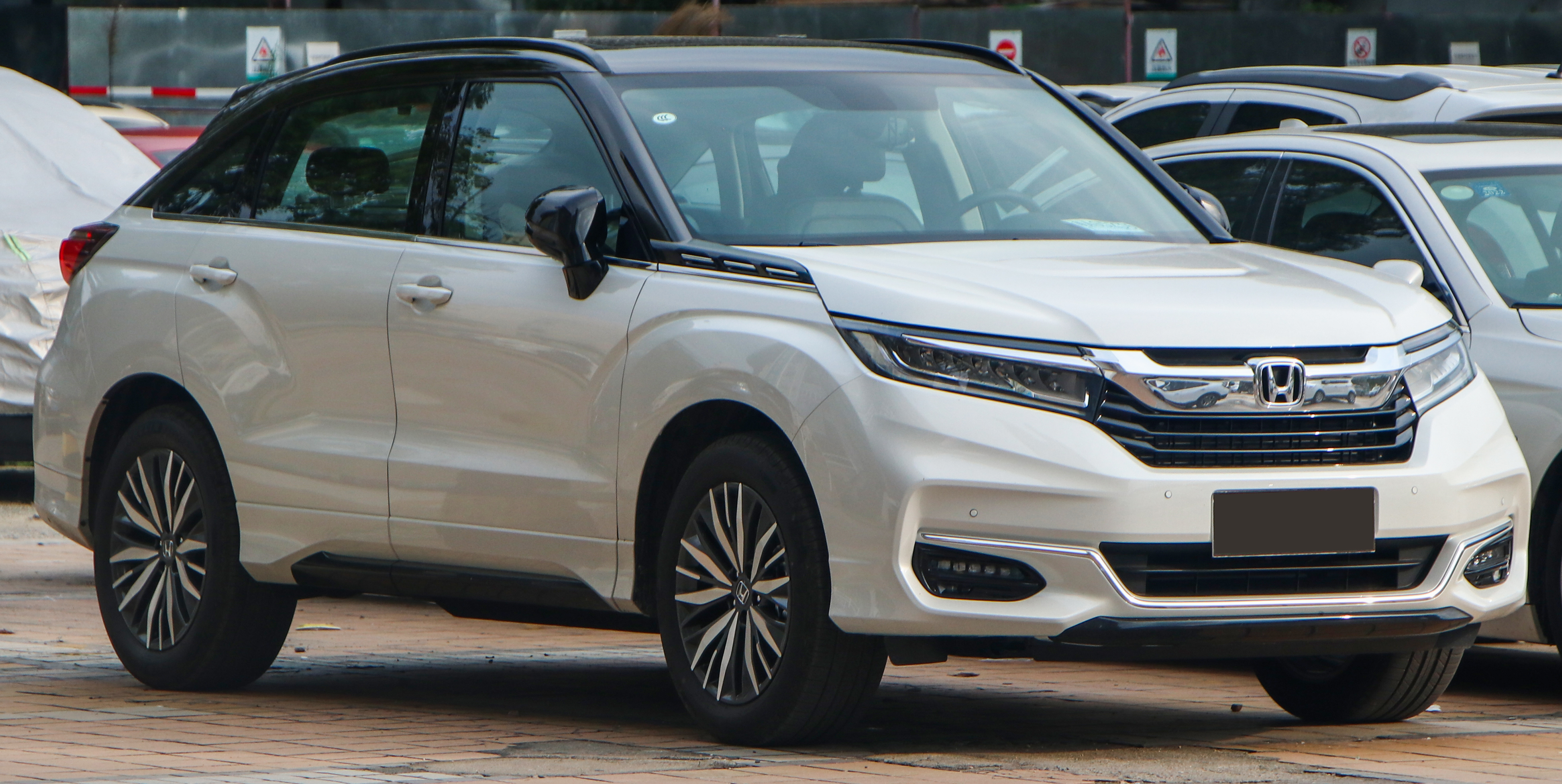
Front view (facelift)

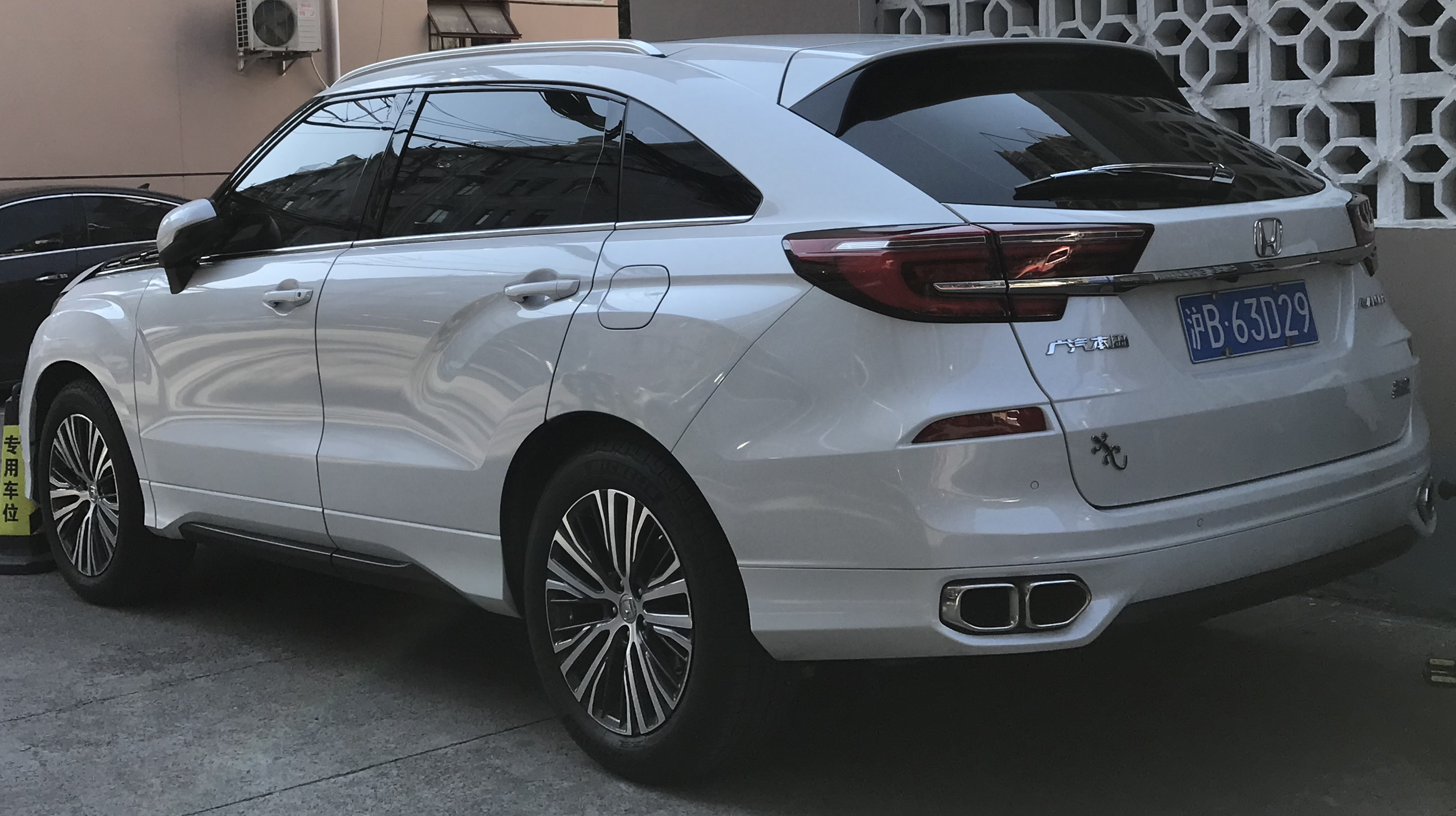
Rear view (facelift)

==== 2023 facelift ====
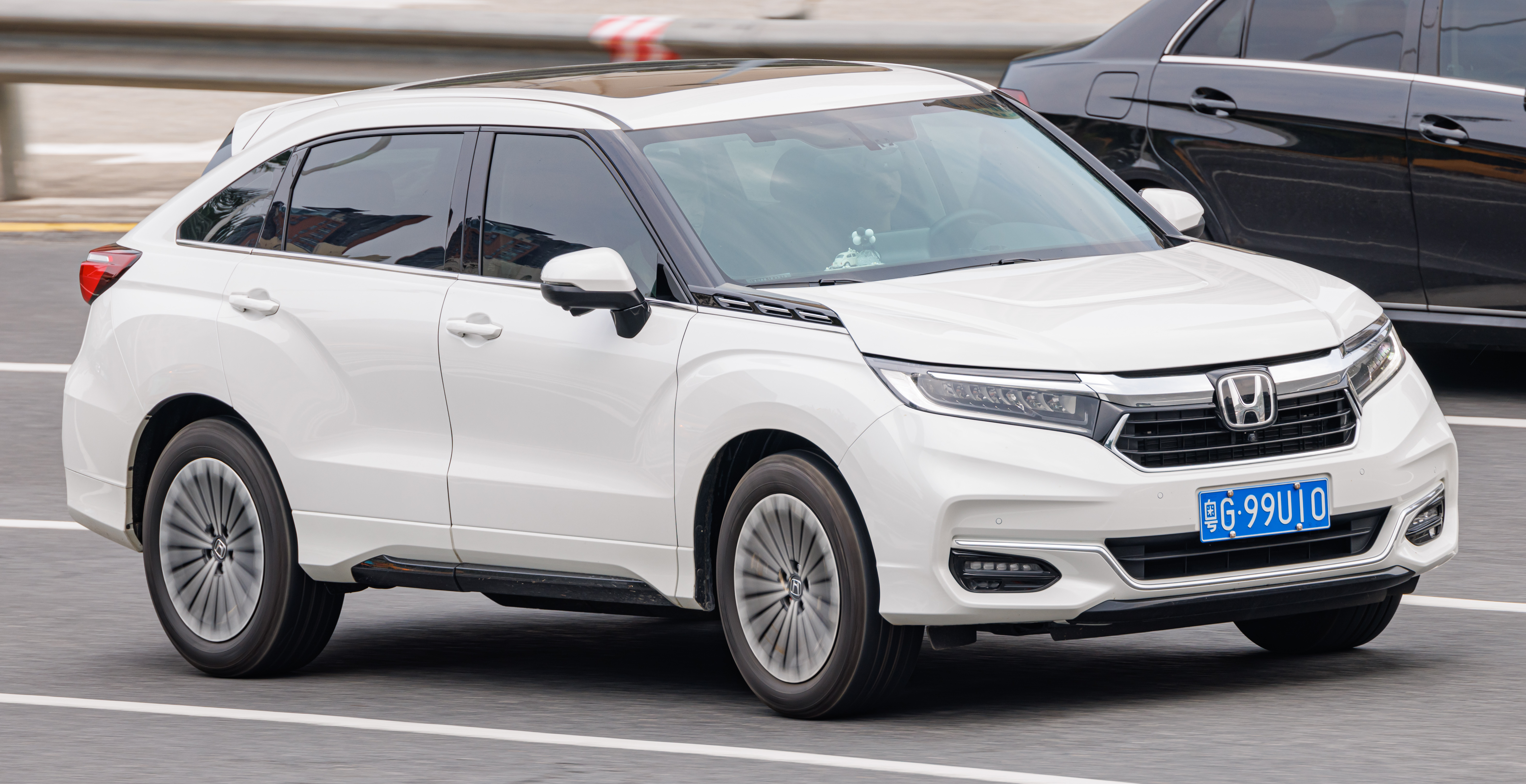
Front view (2023 facelift)

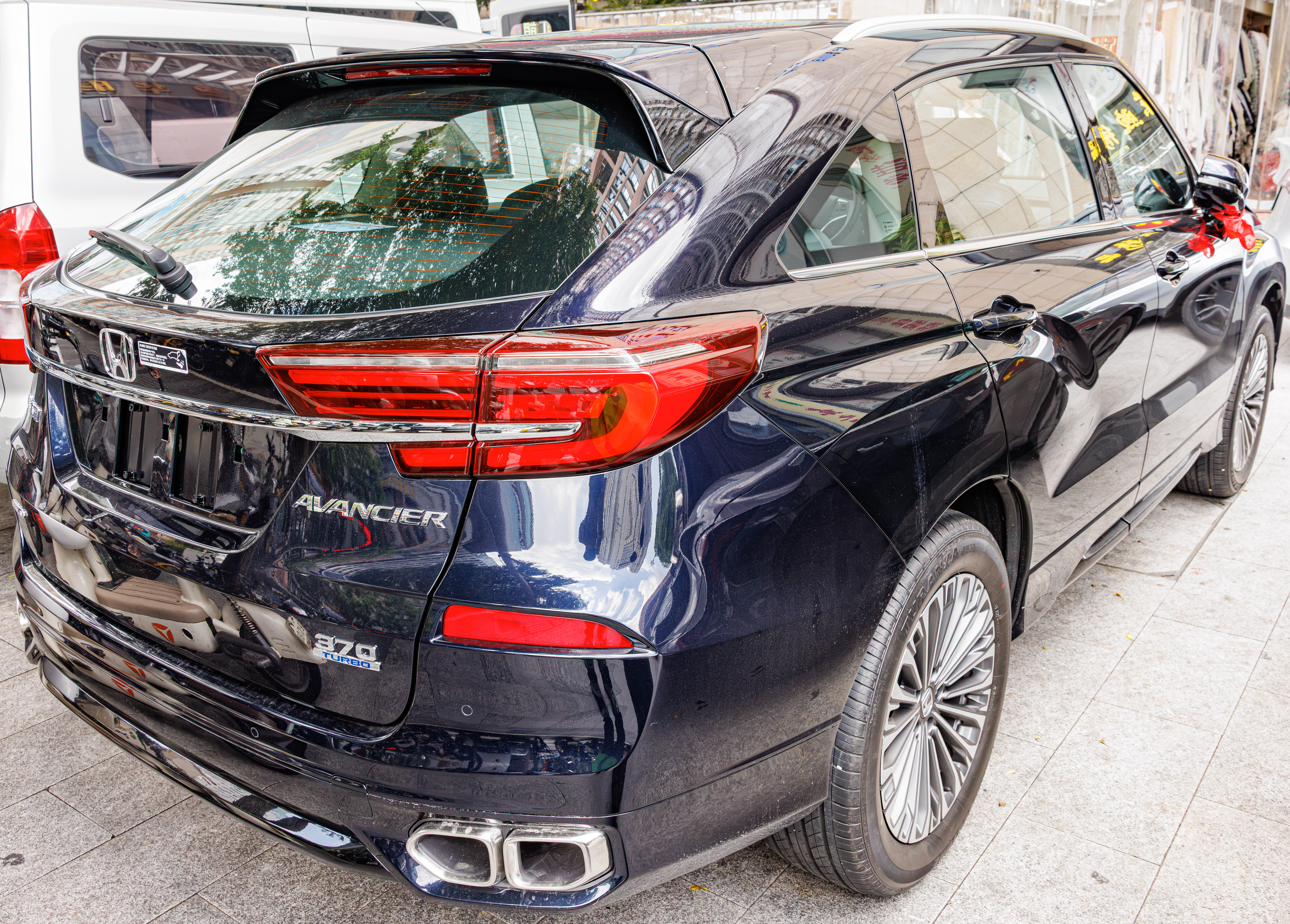
Rear view (2023 facelift)

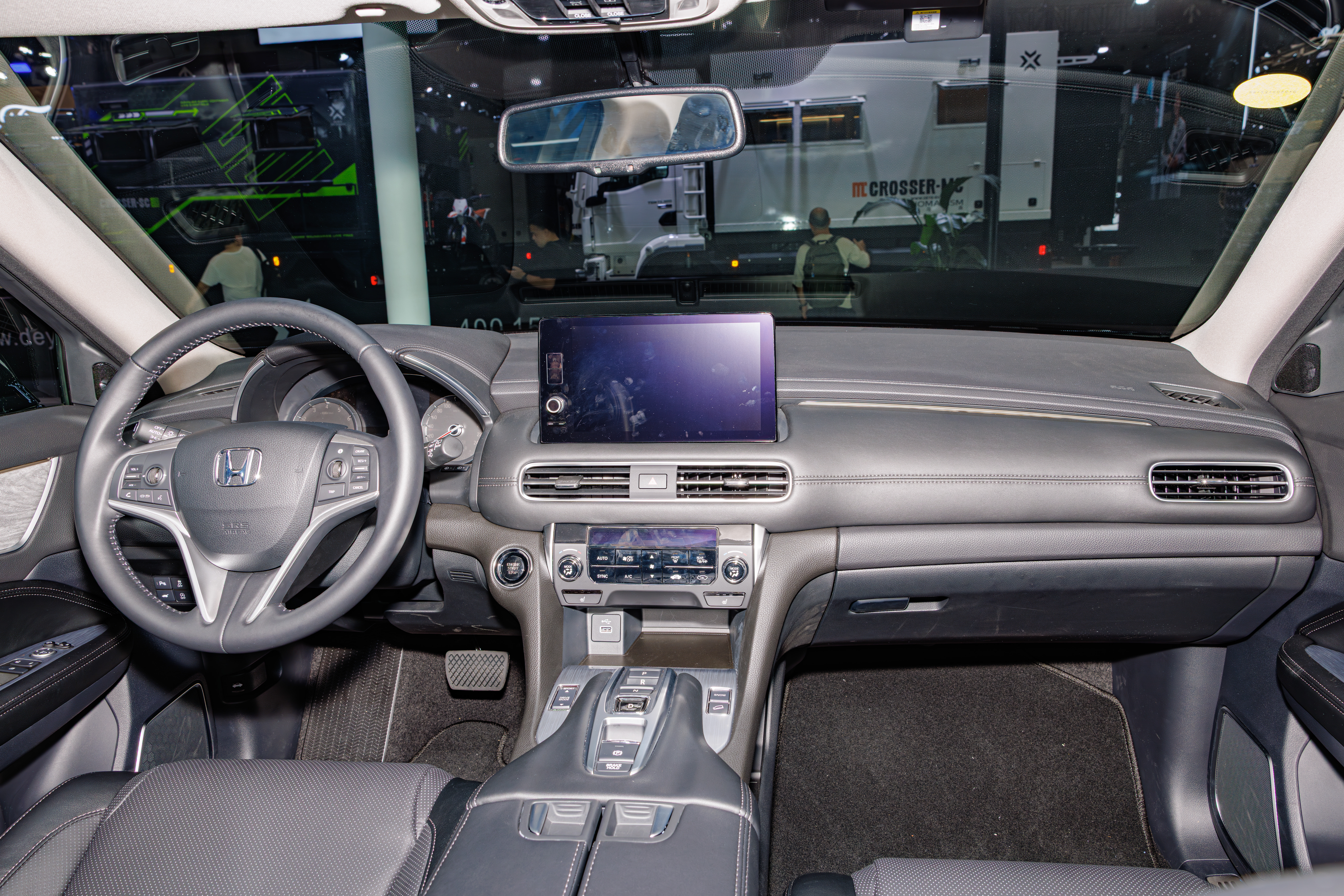
Interior

=== UR-V ===
The UR-V is Dongfeng Honda-produced version of the Guangqi Honda-produced Avancier. It went on sale in March 2017.

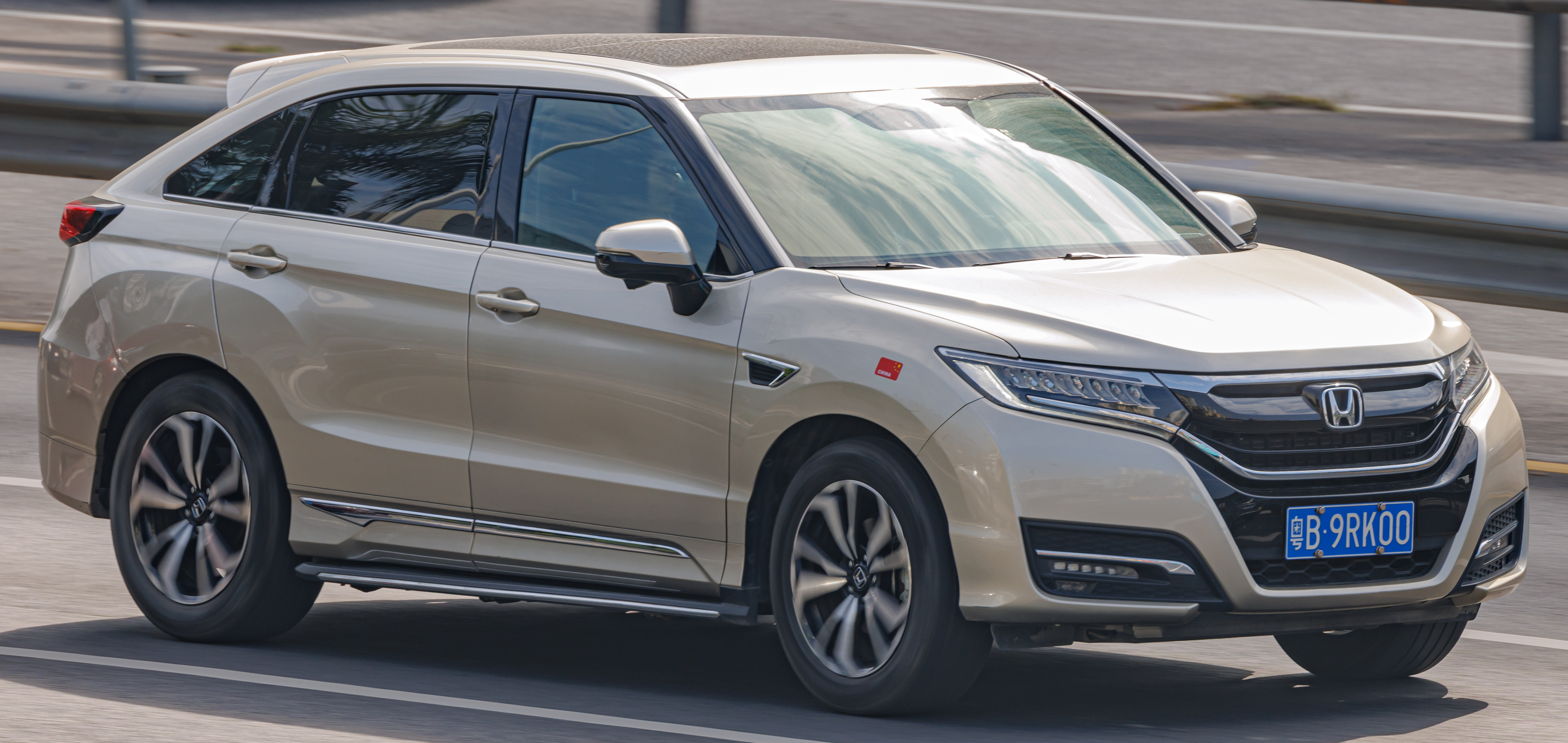
2018 UR-V 370 Turbo front view (pre-facelift)

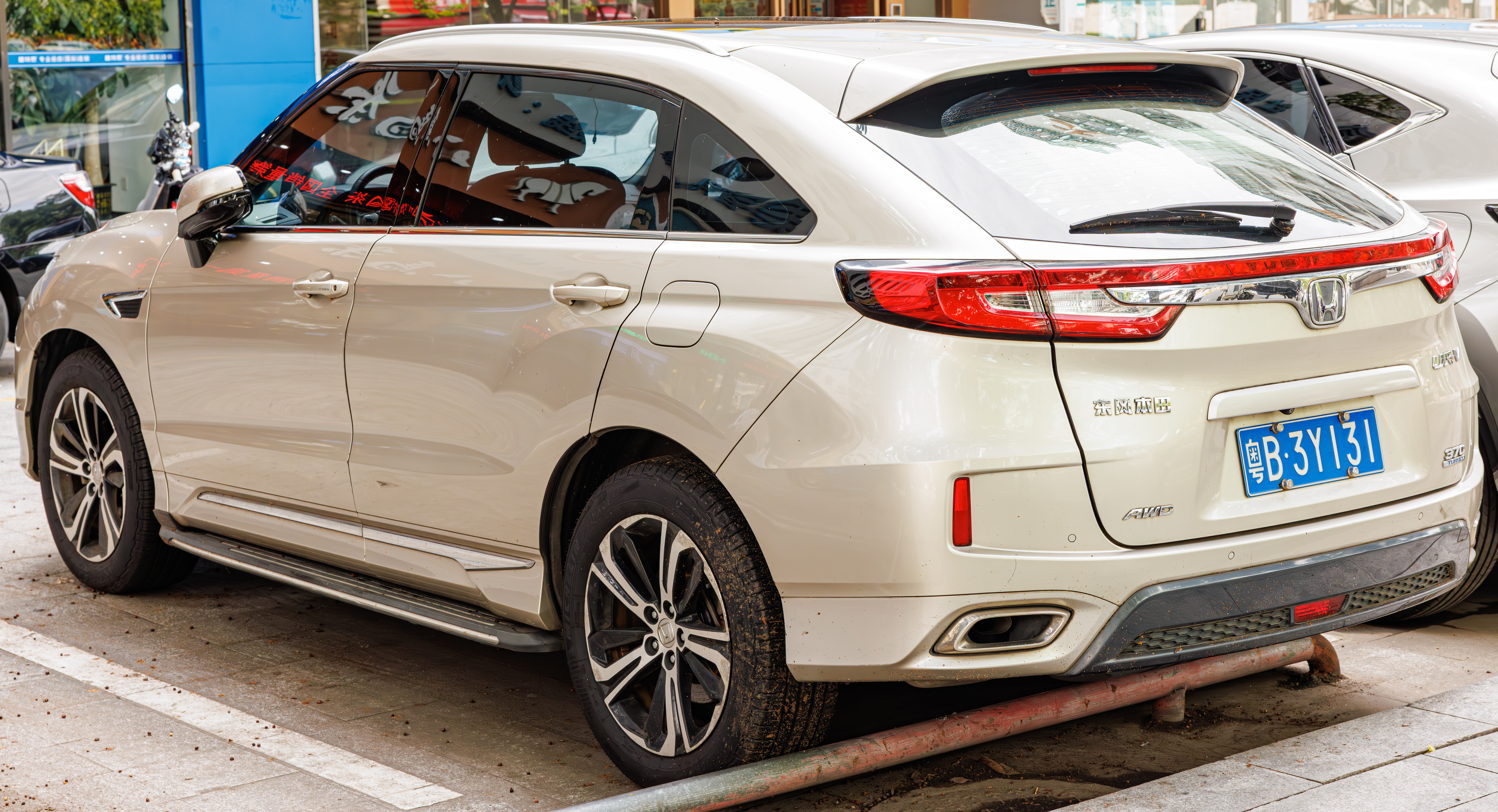
2018 UR-V 370 Turbo rear view (pre-facelift)

==== 2020 facelift ====
The UR-V received a facelift in 2020.

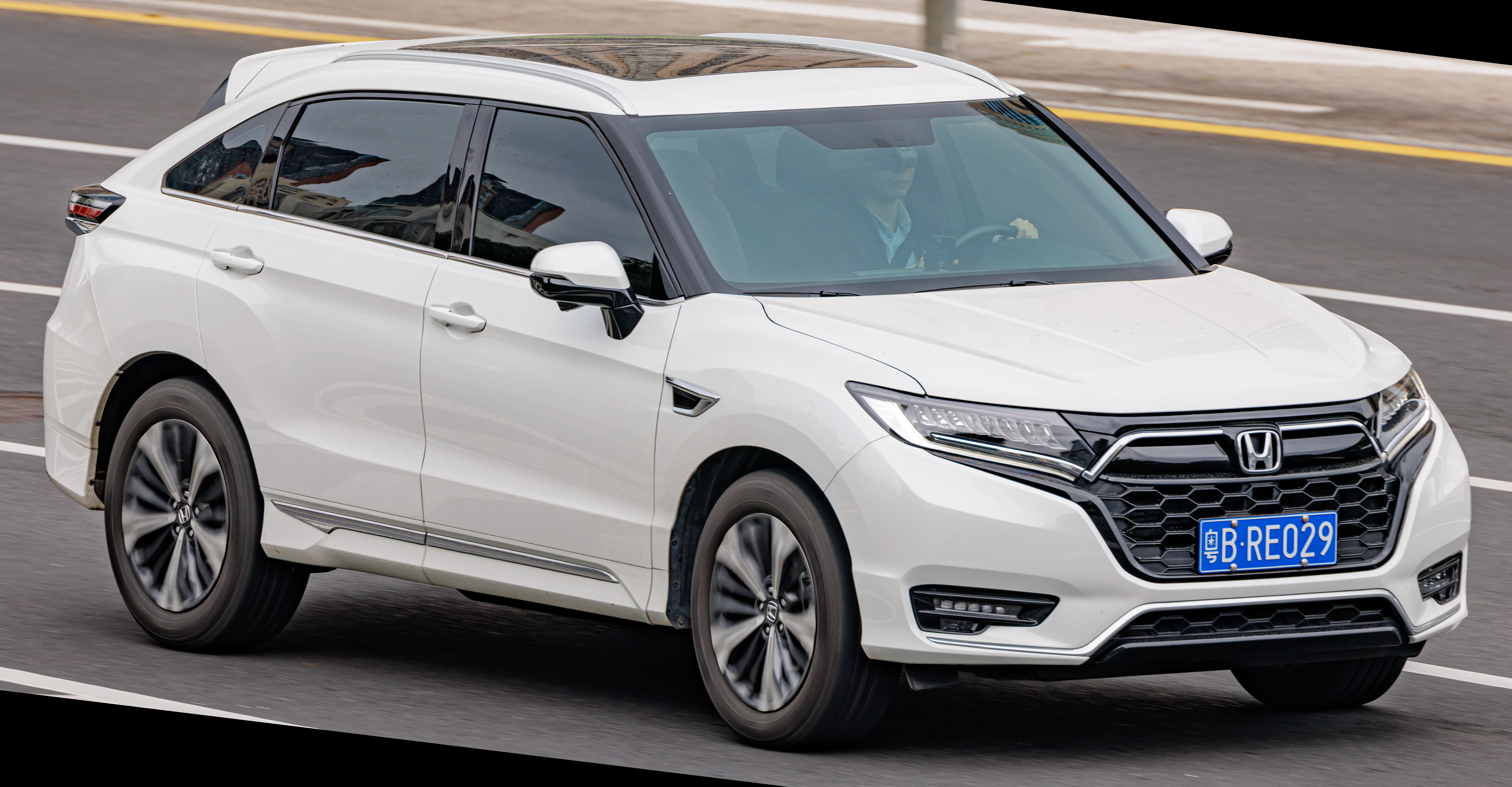
Front view (2020 facelift)

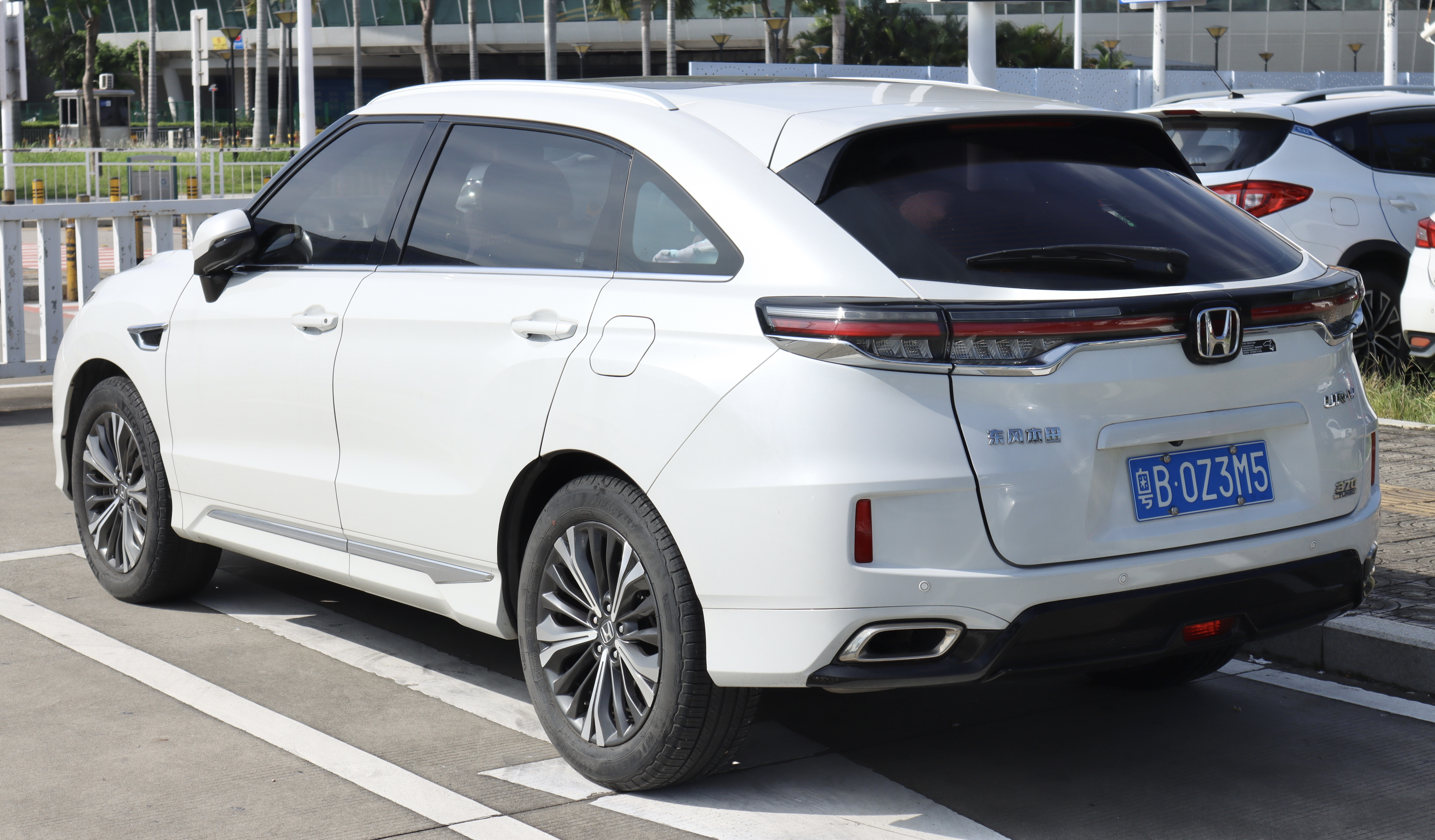
Rear view (2020 facelift)

==== 2023 facelift ====
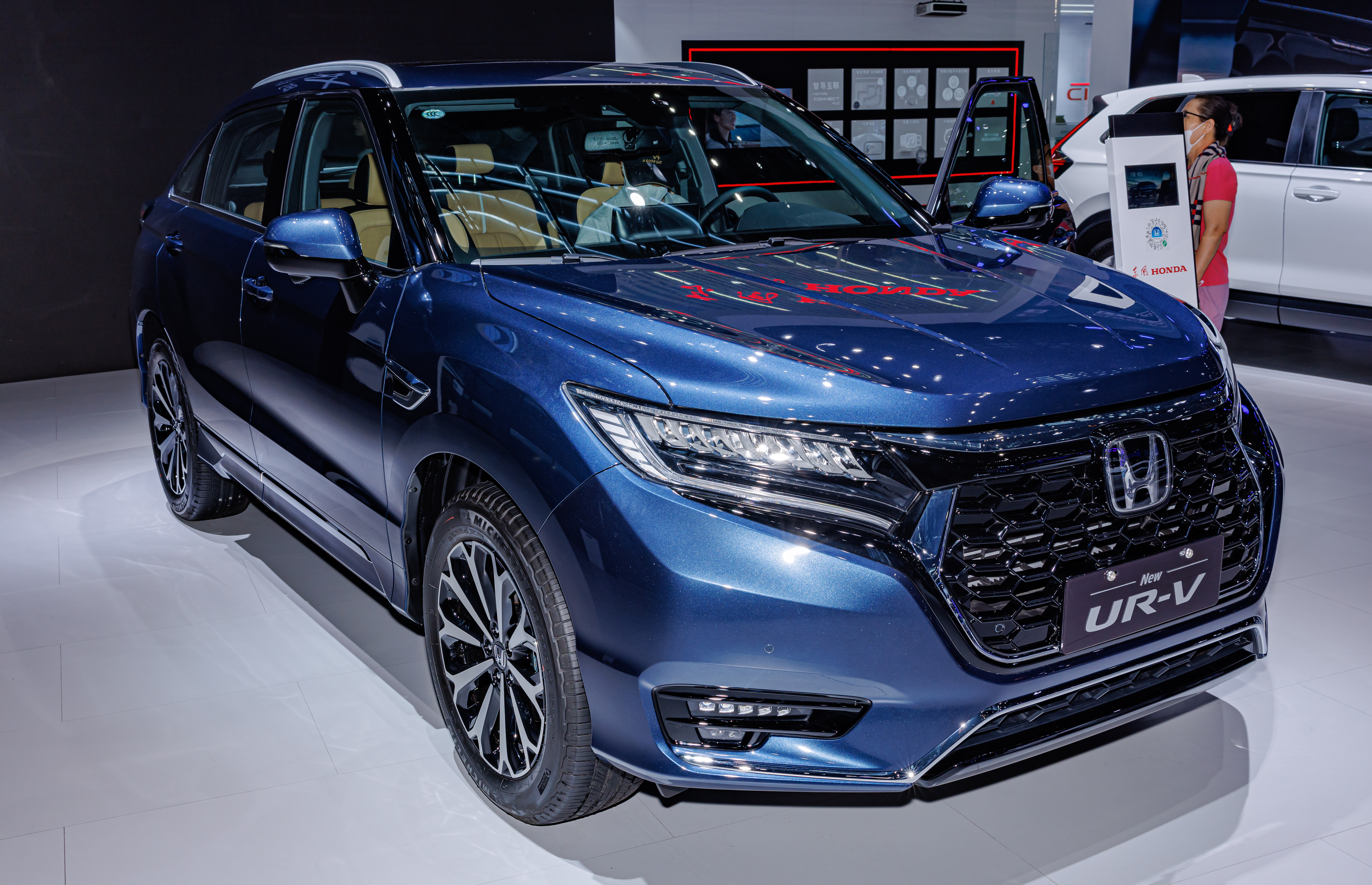
Front view (2023 facelift)

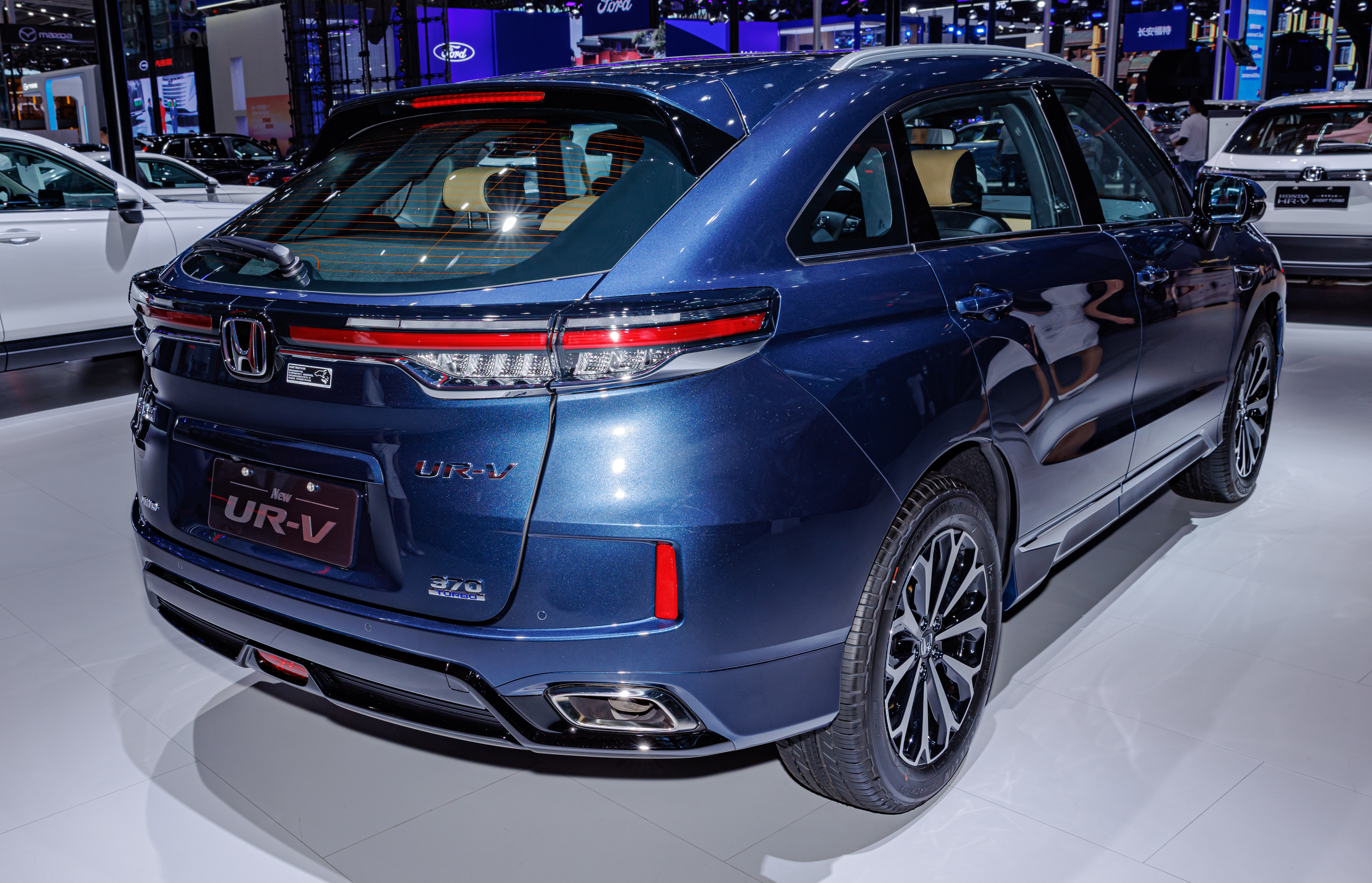
Rear view (2023 facelift)

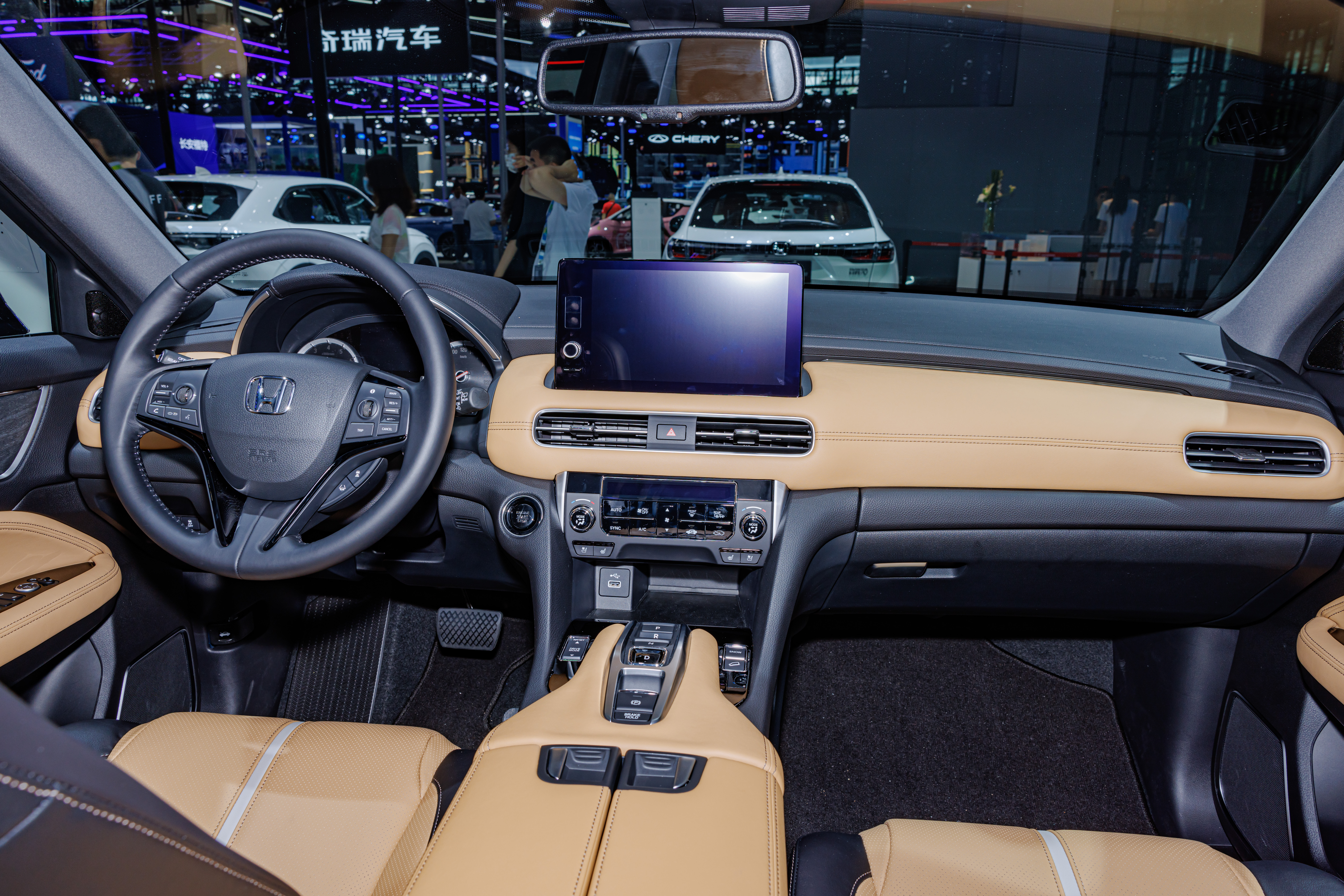
Interior (2023 facelift)

== Second generation (2027) ==
Second generation

Overview
- Production: 2027 (to commence)
- Assembly: Thailand: Prachinburi

Body and chassis
- Layout: Front-engine, front-wheel-drive; Front-engine, four-wheel-drive (DualPower eAWD)
- Platform: Modular Architecture

Powertrain
- Engine: Petrol hybrid: 2.0 L
- Hybrid drivetrain: Power-split

The second-generation Avancier SUV is a three-row model aimed at the Southeast Asian, Japanese and Australian markets, which Honda unveiled on 20 November 2026 ahead of its scheduled debut in Thailand on 1 December 2026. The model is built in Thailand and positioned above the CR-V in the company's lineup. It is also the first production Honda to feature the company's new H logo along with the Honda Hybrid branding for its hybrid electric powertrain. Honda Australia has also confirmed that the Avancier will be sold in Australia, where it will become the first large three-row SUV offered by the brand.

The second generation Avancier was unveiled in Australia on 20 November 2026, when Honda staged a global reveal in Melbourne and an online world premiere. The all-new three-row hybrid SUV is the first Honda model to use the company's next-generation Honda Hybrid system and its newly developed platform, and it also debuts Honda's revised "H" mark. Honda Australia has confirmed that the Avancier will reach local showrooms from April 2027, although pricing, detailed specifications, and production location had not been announced at the reveal. The model marks Honda's return to the large-SUV segment in Australia for the first time since the MDX was discontinued in 2007 and is expected to compete with large family SUVs.

== Sales ==
Year	China	
Year	Avancier	UR-V
2023	31,440	19,526
2024	16,416	9,225
2025	5,884	3,778
