= Honda Accord (North America seventh generation) =

Honda Accord Seventh generation (CM4/5/6/7/8) North America and Asia Pacific
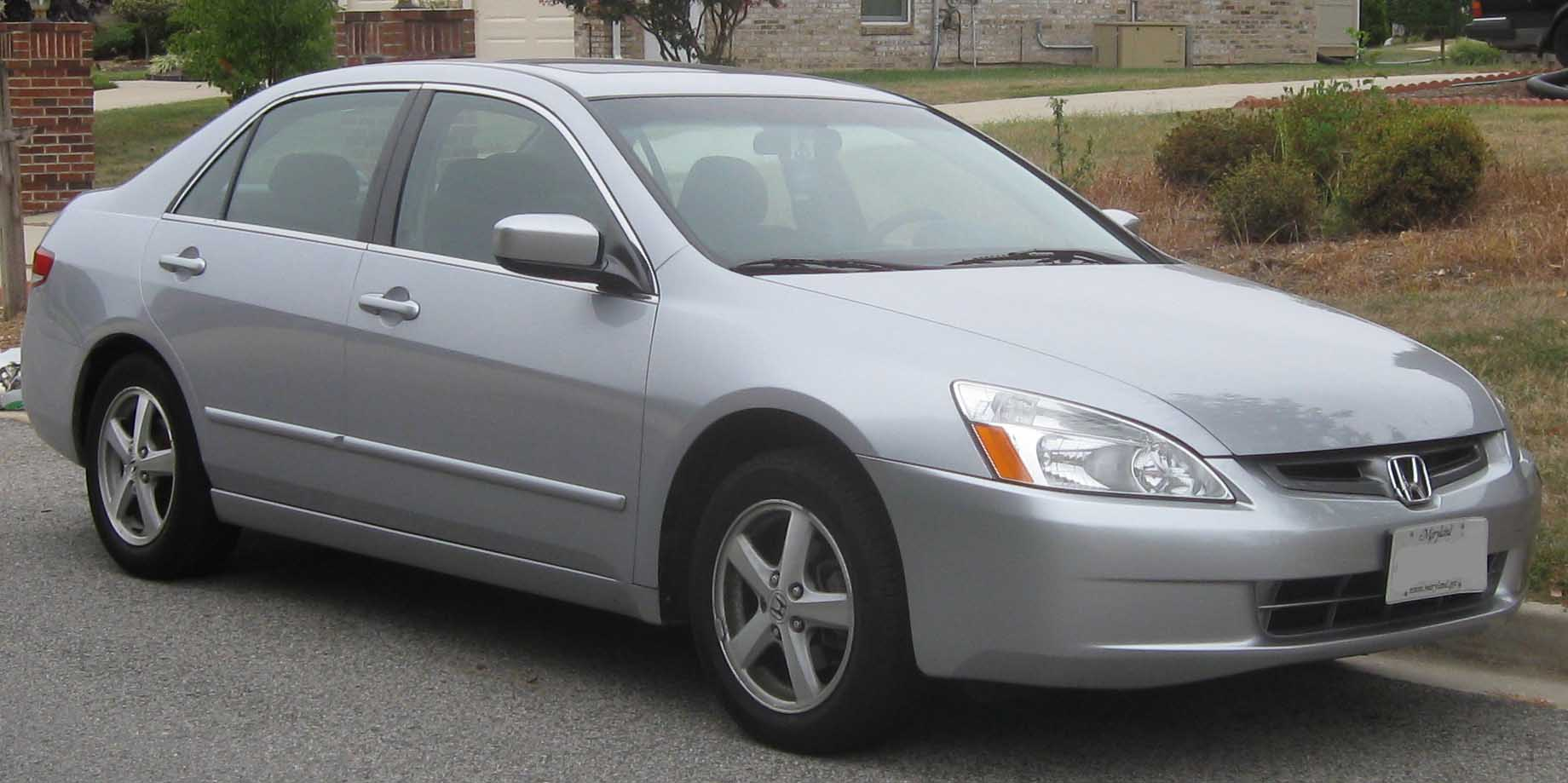

Overview
- Manufacturer: Honda
- Also called: Honda Inspire (Japan)
- Production: September 2002–2007; 2003–2008 (Malaysia)
- Model years: 2003–2007
- Assembly: United States: Marysville, Ohio (Marysville Auto Plant); Mexico: Jalisco; Japan: Sayama, Saitama (Sayama plant); China: Guangzhou (Guangqi Honda); Taiwan: Pingtung (CKD); Thailand: Ayutthaya (CBU); Malaysia: Alor Gajah, Melaka (CKD); India: (CBU; US)
- Designer: Shinji Takashima, Junji Tanabe (2000); Toshiyuki Okumoto, Hirotsugu Nogami (2000, coupe)

Body and chassis
- Class: Mid-size car
- Body style: 4-door sedan (U.S. chassis no. CM4/CM5/CM6); 2-door coupe (U.S. chassis no. CM7/CM8, North America only)
- Layout: Front-engine, front-wheel-drive
- Related: Acura TL; Acura CL

Powertrain
- Engine: Gasoline: 2.0 L K20A6 DOHC i-VTEC I4; 2.4 L K24A4/K24A8 DOHC i-VTEC I4; 3.0 L J30A4 SOHC VTEC/J30A5 SOHC i-VTEC V6; 3.0 L JNA1 V6 hybrid
- Transmission: 5-speed automatic w/overdrive 5-speed manual 6-speed manual 5-speed automatic transmission (hybrid)

Dimensions
- Wheelbase: 107.9 in (2,741 mm) (sedan); 105.1 in (2,670 mm) (coupe)
- Length: 189.5–191.1 in (4,813–4,854 mm) (sedan); 187.6–187.8 in (4,765–4,770 mm) (coupe)
- Width: 71.5–71.6 in (1,816–1,819 mm) (sedan); 71.3 in (1,811 mm) (coupe); 71.4–71.7 in (1,814–1,821 mm) (hybrid)
- Height: 57.1–57.3 in (1,450–1,455 mm) (sedan); 55.7–55.8 in (1,415–1,417 mm) (coupe); 57.2 in (1,453 mm) (hybrid)
- Curb weight: 3,195 lb (1,449 kg) (sedan)

Chronology
- Predecessor: Honda Accord (North America sixth generation)
- Successor: Honda Accord (North America eighth generation)

In the U.S., the seventh generation North American Honda Accord is a mid-size car that was available as a four-door sedan or a two-door coupe and was produced by Honda from September 2002 (for the 2003 model year) to 2007. The sedan was also marketed in parts of Latin America, Asia, Middle East, Caribbean, Australia and New Zealand markets, and also known as the Honda Inspire in Japan from 2003. The North American Honda Accord, with modifications for local market needs, was the launch vehicle of Honda in the South Korean market with sales beginning from 20 May 2004.

Production started in Honda's Marysville Auto Plant. In early 2005, Honda's East Liberty Auto Plant started building the Honda Accord sedan on the same assembly line that produces Civic and Element to increase Honda's flexibility in meeting increased market demand of Acura TL that was also assembled in the Marysville Plant.

== 2003–2005 ==
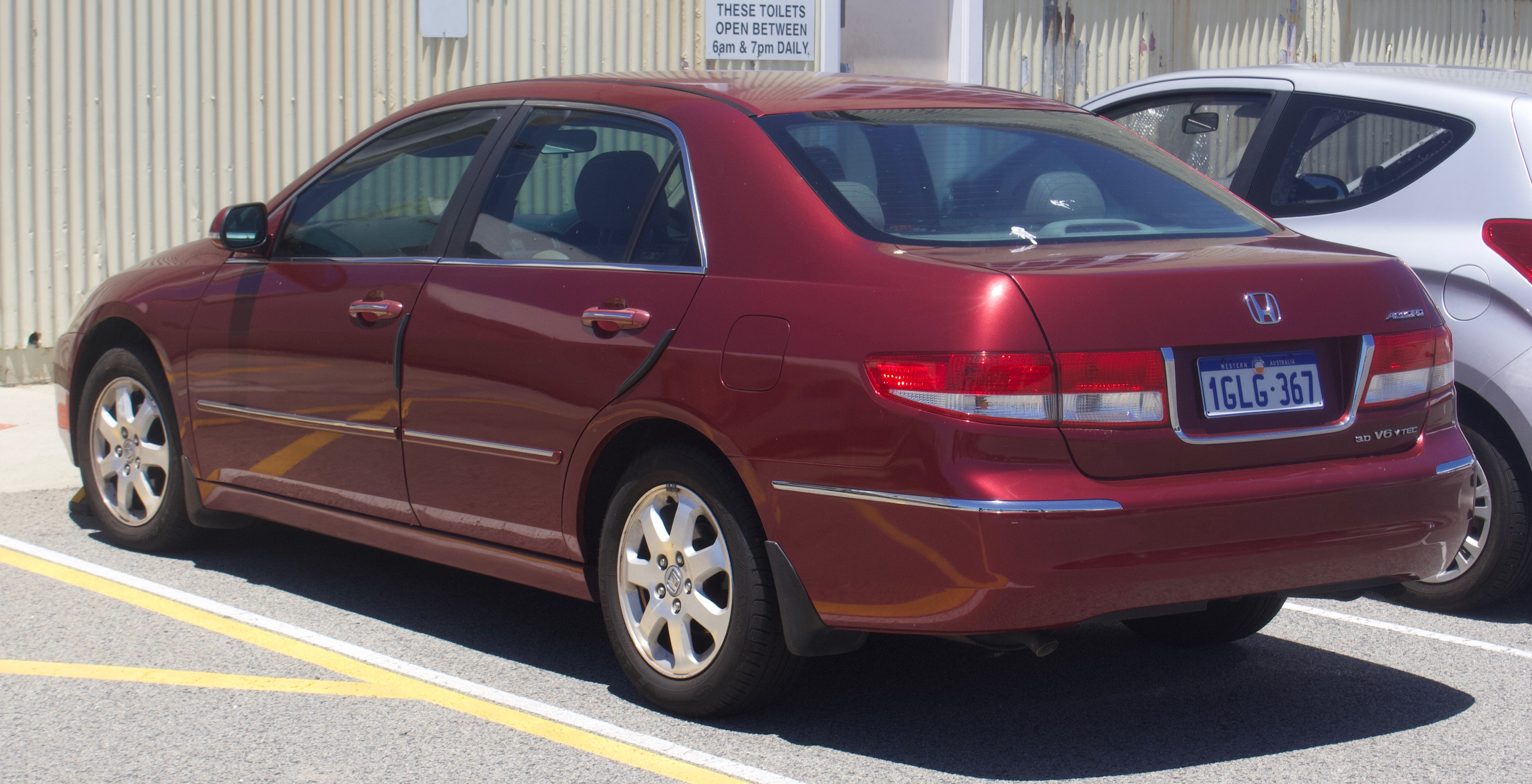
Pre-facelift Honda Accord V6 sedan (Australia)

The first 2003 Honda Accord rolled off the Marysville, Ohio assembly line on 26 September 2002. A larger car than its predecessor, the North American Accord was given a new level of refinement with chrome interior accents and higher-grade materials. The lineup still included all the same trim levels as the previous generation, the DX, LX, EX, LX-V6, and EX-V6.

Mechanically, the four-cylinder engine was the all-new K-series. For the first time, the four-cylinder Accord gained a direct ignition (distributor-less) coil-on-plug ignition system, which had previously been introduced on the V6. The direct ignition system provides a slight horsepower and fuel economy gain, as well as improved long-term reliability, relative to the traditional system with a distributor and spark plug wires. In addition, Honda provided a new recommendation for engine oil viscosity, 5W-20 instead of the previous 5W-30 viscosity. Because of the lower viscosity, engine parts move with less friction, which increases fuel economy. Together with other improvements, this change affected an increase from the previous generation's (with VTEC four-cylinder F23A1 engine and the manual transmission) 22mpg city/29 highway rating, to 23mpg city/31 hwy, according to 2008 EPA ratings. The four-cylinder engine could be mated to a 5-speed manual transmission or to a 5-speed automatic transmission with overdrive (also new for 2003). A specific four-cylinder model was the first production car in the world to meet California's Super Ultra Low Emissions standards.

The six-cylinder models had the same J-series V6 as the sixth generation's, but revisions to the intake and exhaust systems contributed to a 40 hp increase, bringing the total power to 240 hp. The revised exhaust manifold actually became part of the cylinder head casting itself. Six-cylinder Accords generally had a version of the new 5-speed automatic transmission with overdrive, except for the coupe described below, which could be purchased with a 6-speed manual transmission. With the V6 engine and automatic transmission, the Accord achieved a 21mpg city/30 hwy fuel economy rating.

This generation also debuted Honda's GPS assisted Navigation system as an option for the Accord. Prior to this, the Navigation system was only available on the higher end Acura line and the Honda Odyssey. In 2004, Honda also first offered XM Satellite Radio as a factory-installed option.

For 2005, the Accord received several updates, including standard side-curtain and front-seat side-impact airbags for a total of six airbags, revised (all red) taillights for the sedan (coupe taillights remained unchanged), more chrome on the grille, and new wheel designs for LX, LX-V6, and EX-V6 models. A new Accord Hybrid was introduced for the first time, with stylish new wheels, an EPA gas mileage of 29 City/37 HWY, and the same 3.0-liter motor as the regular V6 Accord models, but with increased horsepower. The hybrid version of the V6 produced 255 hp, an increase of 15 hp, making the hybrid quicker than the regular Accord V6 sedan, but still not as quick as the Accord Coupe V6 with 6-speed manual.

=== Coupe ===
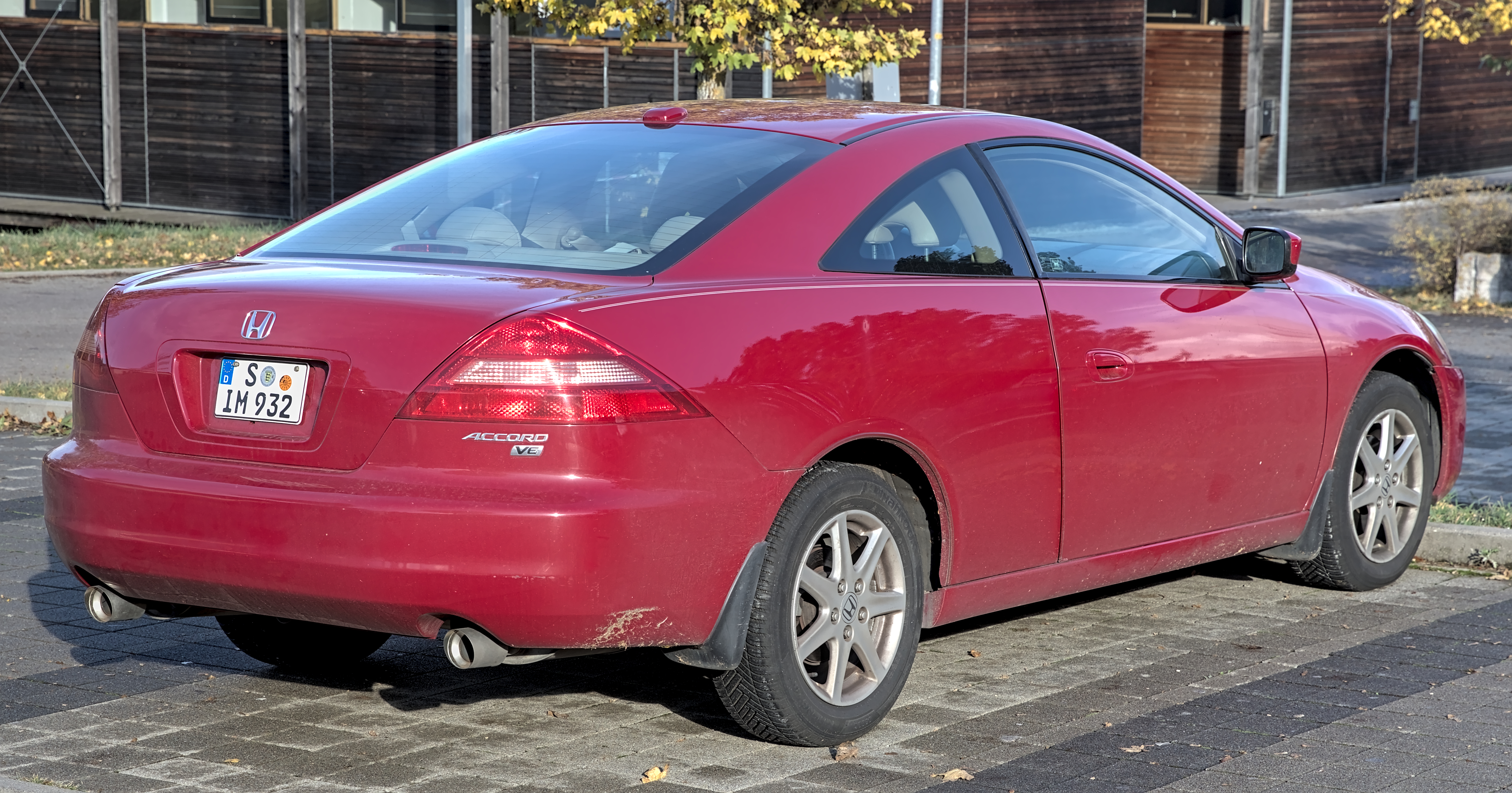
2003–2005 Honda Accord coupe

For the first time, Honda offered an "enthusiast" version of the Accord in the U.S., adding a sports suspension and mating the 6-speed manual transmission from the Acura CL without the Type-S' helical limited-slip front differential. It had bigger 17" wheels fitted with slightly wider 215/50R17 vs. the sedan's 205/60R16, both of which improved handling, per C/D 9/2003.

The Honda Accord Coupe was unveiled as a performance concept at the 2002 SEMA show. The concept-only version had powertrain and chassis modifications that included a high-flow intake and exhaust, 295 bhp (220 kW) 3.2L V6 engine, limited-slip differential, prototype 8-piston Brembo brakes, and a lowered racing suspension and widened track. Exterior modifications included a carbon fiber body kit (including the bumpers, side sills, grille, and underbody diffuser), dual aluminum integrated exhaust ports, aluminum/carbon fiber rear wing, black chrome finish headlights, and taillights, 20-inch black chrome wheels, Bridgestone Potenza S03 235/45 ZR20 tires, and fender flares and NSX Spa Yellow paint. Interior modifications included an F1-style paddle shifter on the steering wheel, prototype multifunction meter display with on-board diagnostics, Sparco carbon/Kevlar backed bucket seats covered in Alcantara suede, 4-point front seat harnesses, three-spoke racing steering wheel, and aluminum sport pedals.

The Factory Performance Package was a dealer option based on the SEMA concept car, available for 2003 Accord LX-V6 and EX-V6 Coupe with either manual or automatic transmissions. Chassis/exterior changes included Factory Performance suspension (shock absorbers, springs), underbody aero kit, 17-inch alloy wheels, 215/50VR-17 high-performance tires, and a rear wing spoiler. Interior accessories included a factory performance shift knob and trim.

== 2006–2007 ==
In 2005, for the 2006 model year, which was its 30th anniversary, the North American Accord received a mid-generational refresh, though it was fairly significant and some enthusiasts called this generation 7.5.

The exterior was revised with a new front grille later seen on the eighth-generation Honda Civic which also debuted that year, new rear-end styling with triangular LED taillights, daytime running lights (DRLs) and heated side mirrors for U.S. EX models. Heated mirrors and DRLs were previously available only on Accords sold in Canada. The 2006 model year also featured new wheel designs, with 17" wheels being standard on V6 models. Vehicle Stability Assist (VSA), traction control, and brake assist became available on the V6 models for the first time. Previously, the system was named TCS and included traction control and brake assist, but not stability control.

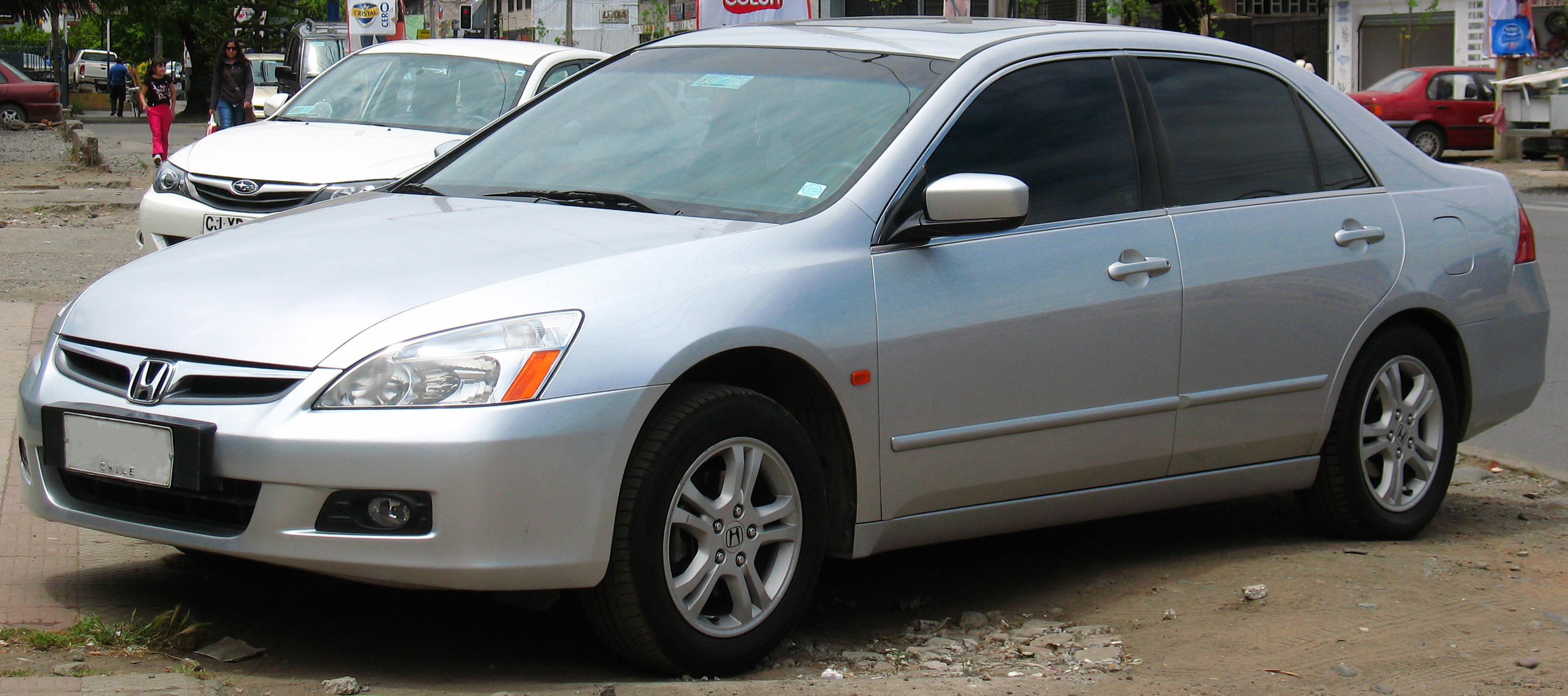
MY06 Facelift (Chile)

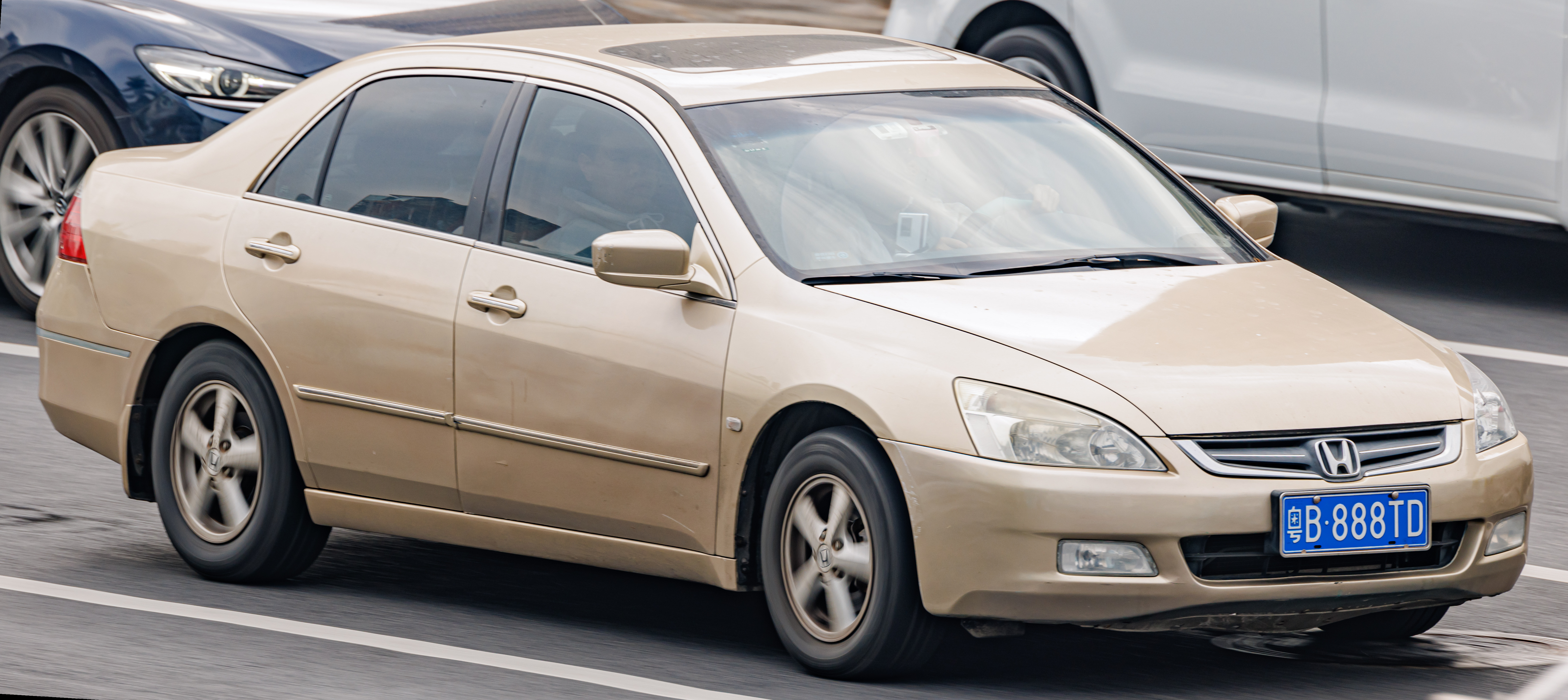
MY06 Facelift (China)

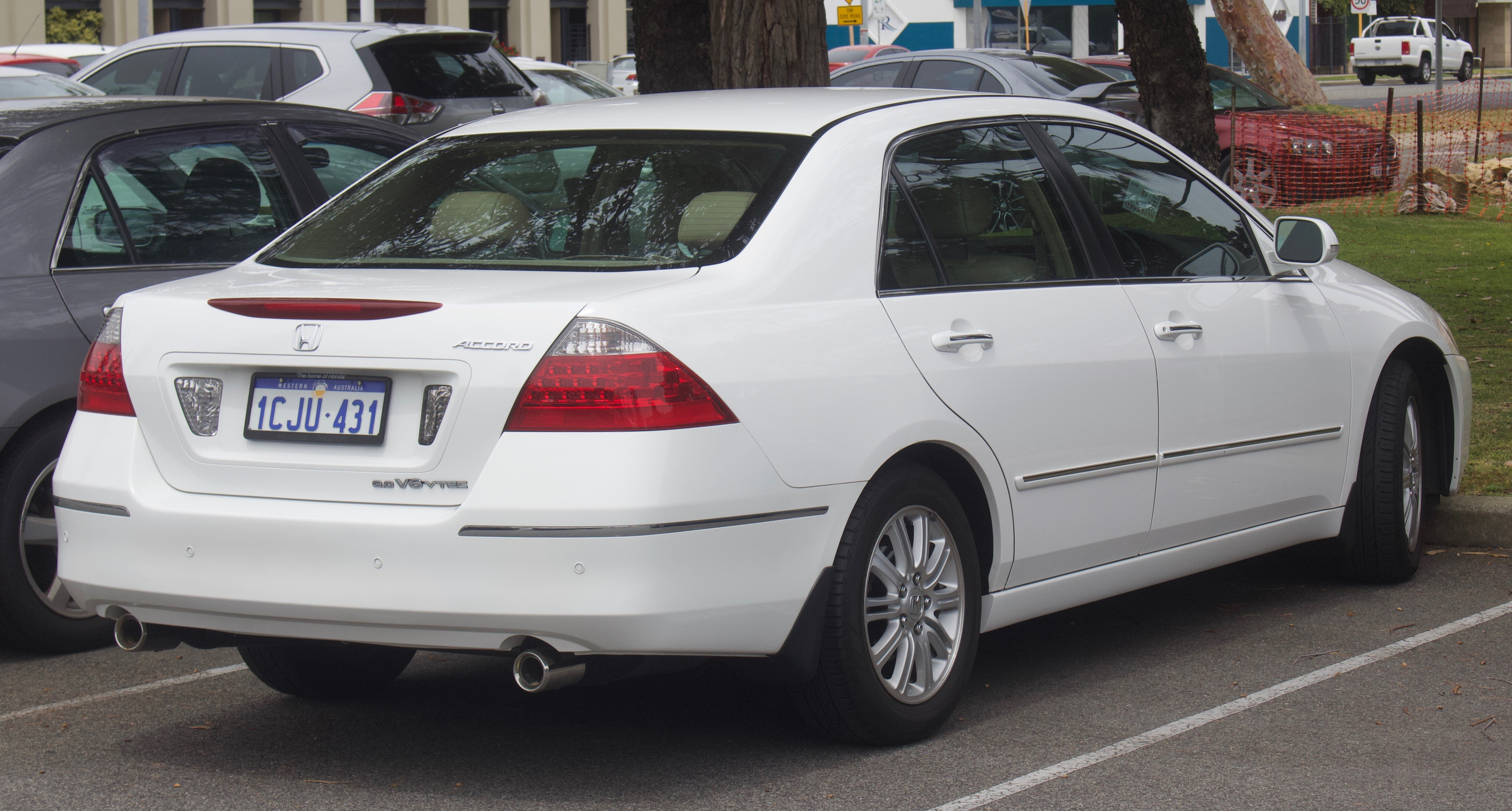
MY06 Facelift (Australia)

The interior was also slightly redesigned with changes such as a new steering wheel cover, differently colored gauges, and a differently styled shift knob for automatic transmission models. A power moonroof was added onto the LX-V6 trim. The GPS Navigation system was updated with a faster processor, more memory, and several new features, such as restaurant information from Zagat. A revised maintenance minder system was also added which gave owners reminders for scheduled maintenance such as oil changes based on operating conditions.

Powertrain improvements were made across the Accord line-up in 2006. The V6 engine's power was increased to 244 bhp (182 kW) (+4 hp, SAE net revised 8/04*) and the four-cylinder engine's power was increased to 166 bhp (124 kW) (+6 hp, SAE net revised 8/04*). Power gains were achieved with extensive improvements to the airflow of the intake and exhaust systems. Due to these improvements, the V6 engine was renamed the J30A5 from the previous J30A4, and the four-cylinder from the K24A4 to the K24A8. For the Brazilian market, the 2.4L engine was dropped in favour of a smaller 2.0L four-cylinder i-VTEC K20A engine generating 148 bhp (110 kW). This was done to make the car more competitive against the newly released Ford Fusion. The 2006 model year was also the first year in which the V6 sedan was offered with a 6-speed manual transmission from the coupe as an option. The four-cylinder Accords were now controlled with Drive-By-Wire (DBW), rather than a throttle cable, providing for smooth operation and enhanced throttle response; V6 Accords already used DBW prior to the 2006 model year.

The 2006 Accord Hybrid got the same revisions as the other Accords, although its engine and battery power was identically powerful to the 2005, the 2006 rating system re-rated it at 253 bhp (189 kW), and a larger battery pack was added. Features that differentiate the Hybrid from other Accords are the different rear light clusters, the antenna, the wheels, the mirror turn signals and the lack of a folding rear seat. The 2005 Hybrids also had a different storage door from other Accords, which disappeared on the 2006 version.

The trim levels were also revised, with the basic Accord DX being replaced by the VP (Value Package) trim which added air conditioning, keyless entry, power locks, and cruise control as standard features compared to the 2005 DX. In Canada, sedans came as DX-G, SE, EX-L, SE-V6, EX-L V6, EX-L V6 6MT, and the Hybrid, while coupe trims included the SE, EX-L, EX-L V6, and EX-L V6 6MT.

For its 2007 model year, a new SE-V6 trim was introduced. The color "Cool Blue Metallic", previously only for the coupe, became available for the sedan. Despite being in its last year of the generation, the 2007 Accord was still ranked highly by reviewers, scoring only slightly below the redesigned Toyota Camry in the Edmunds family sedan comparison.

== Hybrid ==
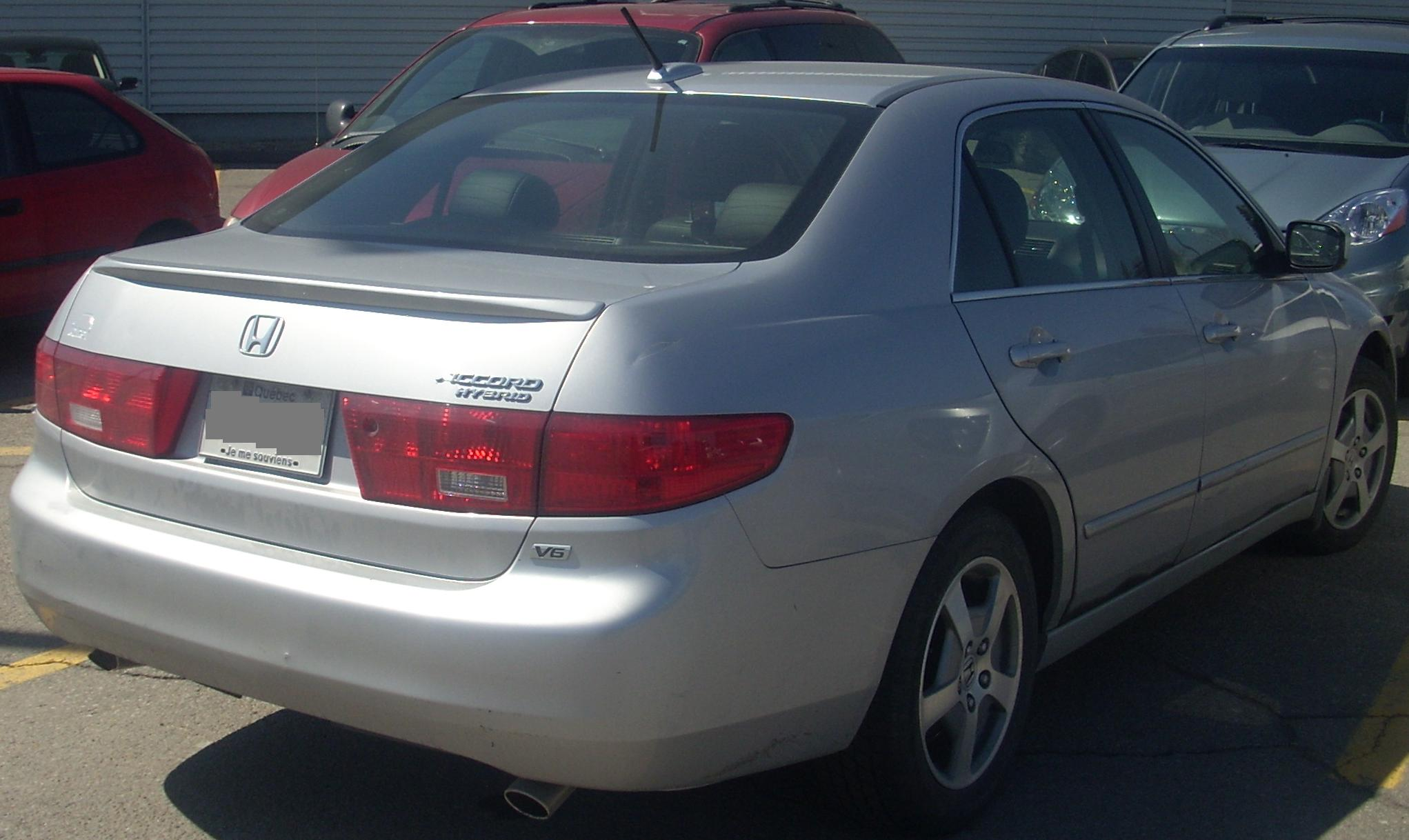
2005 Honda Accord Hybrid (U.S.)

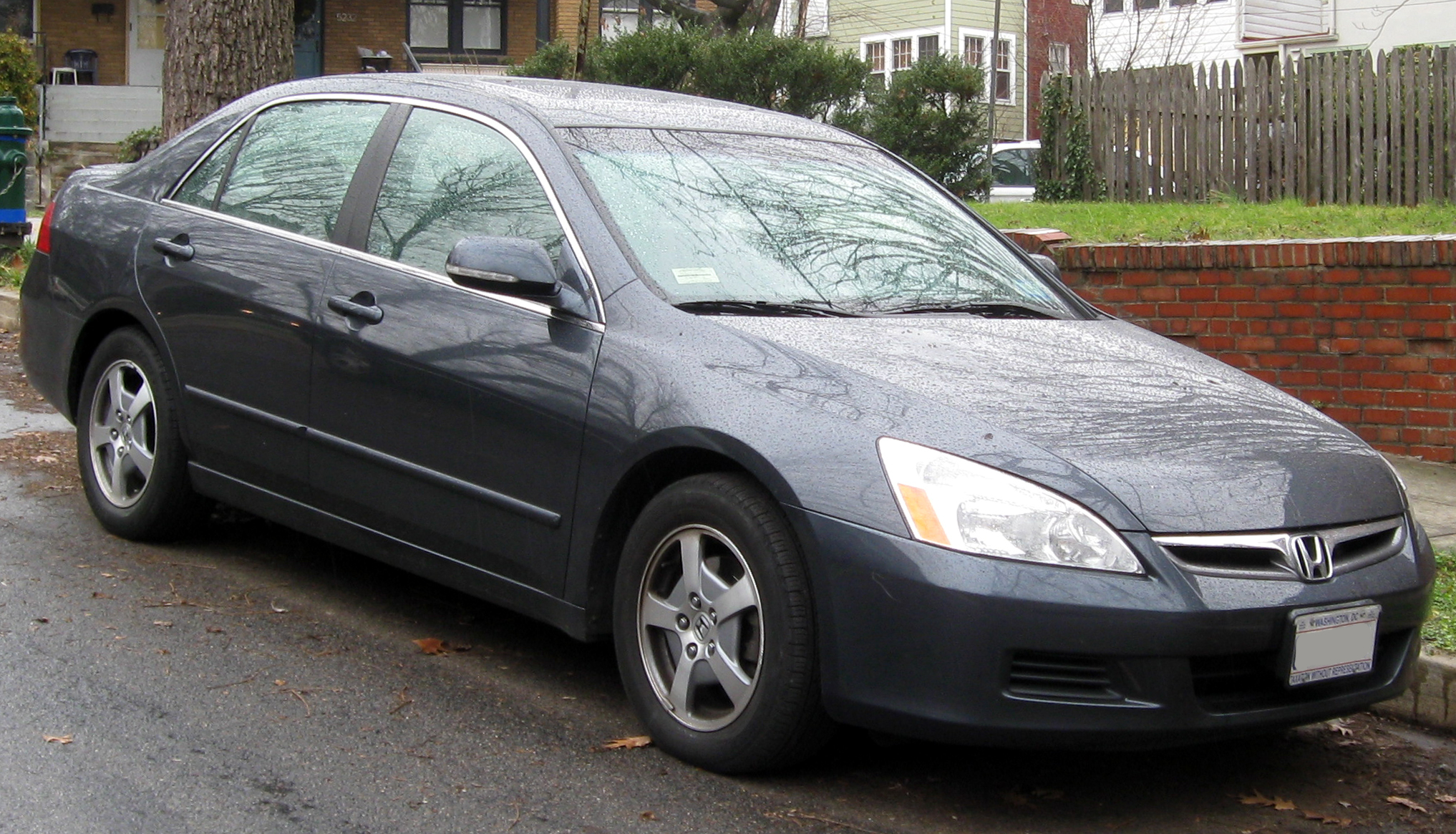
2006–2007 Honda Accord Hybrid (U.S.)

Honda offered the Accord Hybrid in the United States in the 2005 through 2007 model years. Produced exclusively in Sayama, Saitama, Japan, the Accord Hybrid was the company's third hybrid model when the 2005 model was introduced in late 2004, following the Insight and Civic Hybrid. The Accord Hybrid was priced US$3,000 higher than the "EX V6" model Accord, and retained substantially the same trim and feature levels (although the 2005 model did not include a power moonroof). Honda positioned the Accord Hybrid at the top of its non-Acura lineup in North America.

While this new vehicle shared the same displacement as the regular Accord V6 powerplant, the engine in the hybrid was derived from the 2005 Honda Odyssey minivan and has the ability to shut off three of the six cylinders under certain conditions for better fuel economy (a technology that Honda calls VCM or Variable Cylinder Management). The new engine features iVTEC technology and drives a new compact five-speed automatic transmission, developed to allow the inclusion of the electric motor sandwiched between the transversely mounted engine. Power of the gas engine is up from 240 to 255 horsepower (179 to 190 kW) and torque rose from 212 to 232 pound-feet (287 to 315 N⋅m). The vehicle reaches 60 miles per hour (97 km/h) in 6.5 seconds. Together with the Integrated Motor Assist electric motor, the hybrid version provided slightly higher performance than the conventional V6-engined Accord.

Fuel economy was originally estimated at 30 mpg_{‑US} (7.8 L/100 km) city and 37 mpg_{‑US} (6.4 L/100 km) highway for the 2005 model year, but was later changed to 28 mpg_{‑US} (8.4 L/100 km) city, 35 mpg_{‑US} (6.7 L/100 km) highway, after Honda's addition of standard moonroof and spare tire during the 2006 model year. This change bumped the car to a higher weight class for United States Environmental Protection Agency mileage testing. The 2006 model has also been rated an AT-PZEV vehicle. AT-PZEV (Advanced Technology-Partial Zero Emissions Vehicle) is an emissions standard created by the California Air Resources Board. 2005 model year Accord Hybrids were rated LEVII-ULEV by the California Air Resources Board and Tier2, Bin5 by the EPA.

For 2006, the Accord Hybrid came standard with Vehicle Stability Assist (VSA), and like the conventional Accord, received a minor exterior facelift. Accord Hybrids from the model year 2006 and up can be identified by the amber rear turn signals whereas their fully-gasoline counterparts have red rear turn signals.

The marketplace did not embrace the Hybrid model of the seventh generation Accord, as it competed against the sixth generation Toyota Camry Hybrid (based on an inline-4 gasoline engine); the Camry Hybrid's price point was comparable against gasoline-only V6 Accord and Camry trims on offer, whereas the Accord Hybrid was comparatively more expensive. In addition while the Accord Hybrid had the same mileage as the gasoline-only Accord V6 (albeit the Hybrid has higher horsepower without consuming extra fuel, hence a "muscle hybrid"), the Camry Hybrid was more efficient than its gasoline-only inline-4 and V6 trims.

The Accord Hybrid was discontinued when the rest of the seventh generation Accord production concluded. No Accord Hybrid was offered for the eighth generation Accord. Honda announced the Accord Hybrid would return to the market for the 2014 model year based on the ninth generation Accord, with a new dual-motor system and a plug-in option.

For the 2018 model year, Honda offered a hybrid version of the 10th generation Accord.

== Mechanical ==
=== Body styles ===
Chassis codes	Body types	Accord	Accord V6
CM4/CM5/CM6	4-door sedan	2003–2007	2003–2007
CM7/CM8	2-door coupe	2003–2007	2003–2007

=== Engines ===
Model	Years	Type/code	Power, torque at rpm
Accord	2003–2005	2,354 cc (2.354 L; 143.6 cu in) I4 (K24A4)	160 bhp (119 kW) at 5,500, 161 lb⋅ft (218 N⋅m) at 4,500
Accord	2006–2007	2,354 cc (2.354 L; 143.6 cu in) I4 (K24A8)	166 bhp (124 kW) at 5,800, 160 lb⋅ft (217 N⋅m) at 4,000
Accord V6	2003–2005	2,997 cc (2.997 L; 182.9 cu in) SOHC VTEC V6 (J30A4)	240 bhp (179 kW) at 6,250, 212 lb⋅ft (287 N⋅m) at 5,000
Accord V6	2006–2007	2,997 cc (2.997 L; 182.9 cu in) SOHC VTEC V6 (J30A5)	244 bhp (182 kW) at 6,250, 211 lb⋅ft (286 N⋅m) at 5,000
Accord Hybrid	2005	2,997 cc (2.997 L; 182.9 cu in) SOHC i-VTEC VCM V6 (JNA1)	255 bhp (190 kW) at 6,000, 232 lb⋅ft (315 N⋅m) at 5,000
Accord Hybrid	2005	144V electric motor	16 bhp (12 kW) at 840, 100 lb⋅ft (136 N⋅m) at 840
Accord Hybrid	2005	6.0Ah 144V (120 cells at 1.2 V) Ni-MH	13.8 kW
Accord Hybrid	2006–2007	2,997 cc (2.997 L; 182.9 cu in) SOHC i-VTEC VCM V6 (JNA1)	253 bhp (189 kW) at 6,000, 232 lb⋅ft (315 N⋅m) at 5,000
Accord Hybrid	2006–2007	144V electric motor	16 bhp (12 kW) at 840, 100 lb⋅ft (136 N⋅m) at 840
Accord Hybrid	2006–2007	6.0Ah 144V (120 cells at 1.2 V) Ni-MH	13.8 kW

Changes to power rating in 2006 and later model year vehicles was caused by the use of Society of Automotive Engineers (SAE) J1349 (Rev 8/04) net calculations that went into effect in January 2005.

Partial Zero Emissions Vehicle versions only came in four-cylinder sedans equipped with automatic transmission. Beginning in the 2004 model year, PZEV models sales began in the U.S. states of New York, Maine, Vermont and Massachusetts.

=== Transmissions ===
Model	Years	Type/code
Accord	2003–2007	5-speed manual, 5-speed automatic w/overdrive
Accord V6	2003–2007	5-speed automatic w/overdrive, 6-speed manual (EX coupe, 2006-07 EX sedan)

- A 5-speed Hondamatic H5 transmission replaces the previous 4-speed automatic.
- The new transmission also features an updated grade logic control system.
- By using sensors that monitor throttle position, vehicle speed and acceleration/deceleration and then comparing these inputs with a map stored in the transmission's computer, the system is able to determine when the vehicle is on an incline and adjust the shift schedule for improved climbing power or downhill engine braking.

== Safety ==
The National Highway Traffic Safety Administration (NHTSA) has crash test ratings of Accord of different model years:

Model year	Model	Type	Front driver	Front passenger	Side driver	Side passenger	4x2 rollover
2003	Accord	4dr					
2004	Accord	4dr w/SAB					
2005	Accord	2dr w/SAB					
2006	Accord	4dr w/SAB					
2007	Accord	2dr w/SAB					

The Accord comes with dual stage front air bags as standard across all models and Driver's and front passenger's side airbags (standard on EX 4-cylinder and all V6 models, available on LX 4-cylinder models). The passenger side airbags are also equipped with out of position (OOP) occupant sensing which consists of seven sensors in the passenger seat back determine the height and position of the occupant to assist the system in determining if it is safe to deploy the side air bag.

A three-point front seat belts with load-limiters and pre-tensioners also come as standard across all models.

Honda benchmarked the competition - the intermediate car segment as well as more expensive car segments - when engineering the 2003 Accord.

For chassis rigidity, Honda engineers benchmarked the BMW 3-Series, the Audi A4 and A6, and even the Mercedes-Benz S Class. In torsional rigidity, the 7th Generation Accord achieved its target of surpassing BMW, Audi and Mercedes-Benz, and is second only to the Mercedes-Benz S Class in bending rigidity.

The Insurance Institute for Highway Safety also found 2003–04 Accords had the lowest fatality rates in the non-luxury mid-size sedan class.

== Recalls ==
Recall 11v-395 was initiated on 4 August 2011, for V6 Accords and other V6 Hondas with automatic transmissions. Four-cylinder models were not affected. The recall was estimated to cover 1,512,107 vehicles.

On 1 October 2012, Honda announced a recall of 573,147 Accords in the U.S. and 30,058 in Canada equipped with V6 engines from model years 2003 through 2007. The addition of the Accords to already recalled Acura TL cars from model years 2007 and 2008 raises the number of affected vehicles in the United States and Canada to 660,086.

Recall 14v-351 was initiated on 19 June 2014, for many Hondas involved in the Takata airbag recall.
