= Honda K engine =

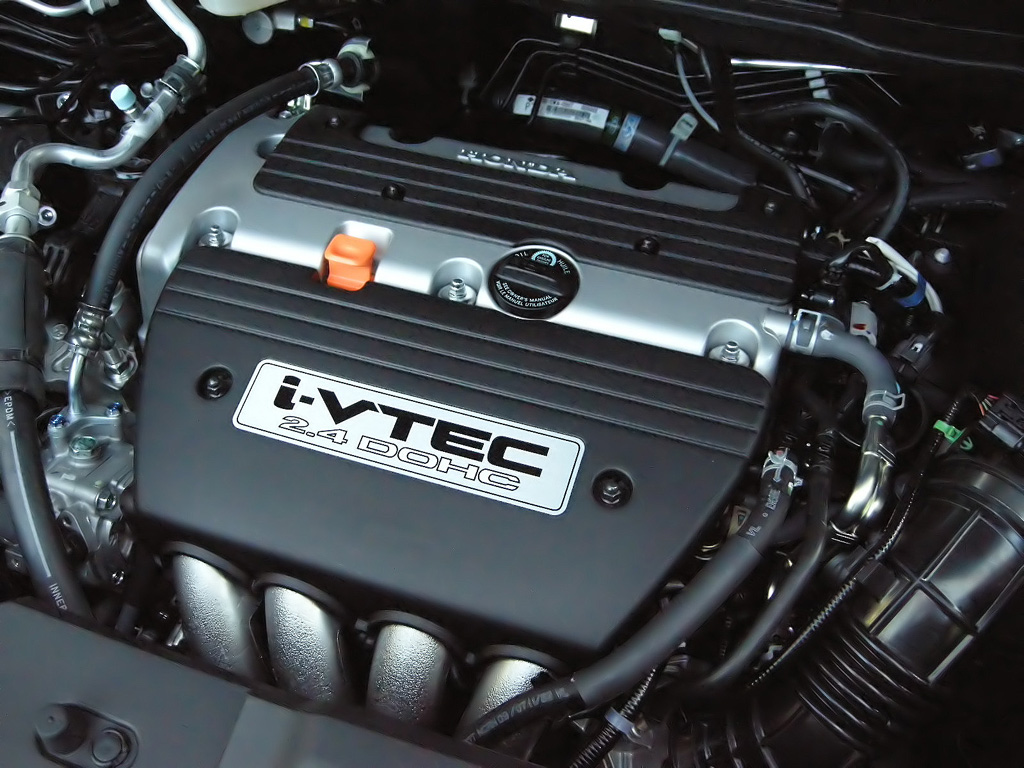

Overview
- Manufacturer: Honda
- Production: 2001–present

Layout
- Configuration: Inline-4
- Displacement: 2.0–2.4 L; 121.9–143.6 cu in (1,998–2,354 cc)
- Cylinder bore: 86 mm (3.39 in); 87 mm (3.43 in)
- Piston stroke: 85.9 mm (3.38 in); 86 mm (3.39 in); 99 mm (3.90 in)
- Cylinder block material: Aluminum
- Cylinder head material: Aluminum
- Valvetrain: DOHC 4 valves x cyl., with i-VTEC
- Compression ratio: 8.8:1–11.7:1

RPM range
- Max. engine speed: 6,500–8,400

Combustion
- Turbocharger: Mitsubishi TD03 or TD04 (some versions)
- Fuel system: Programmed fuel injection Direct injection
- Fuel type: Gasoline
- Cooling system: Water-cooled

Output
- Power output: 152–324 PS (112–238 kW; 150–320 hp)
- Torque output: 18.11–42.86 kg⋅m (178–420 N⋅m; 131–310 lb⋅ft)

Chronology
- Predecessor: Honda B engine

The Honda K-series engine is a line of four-cylinder four-stroke car engines introduced in 2001. The K-series engines are equipped with DOHC valvetrains and use roller rockers on the cylinder head to reduce friction. The engines use a coil-on-plug, distributorless ignition system with a coil for each spark plug. This system forgoes the use of a conventional distributor-based ignition timing system in favor of a computer-controlled system that allows the ECU to control ignition timings based on various sensor inputs. The cylinders have cast iron sleeves similar to the B- and F-series engines, as opposed to the FRM cylinders found in the H- and newer F-series engines found only in the Honda S2000.

Similar to B series, the K-series car engines have two short blocks with the same design; the only difference between them being the deck height. K20 uses the short block with a deck height of 212 mm (8.3 in) where K23 and K24 block has a deck height of 231.5 mm (9.1 in).

Two versions of the Honda i-VTEC system can be found on a K-series engine, and both versions can come with variable timing control (VTC) on the intake cam. The VTEC system on engines like the K20A3 only operate on the intake cam; at low rpm only one intake valve is fully opened, the other opening just slightly to create a swirl effect in the combustion chamber for improved fuel atomization. At high engine speeds, both intake valves open fully to improve engine breathing. In engines such as the K20A2 found in the Acura RSX Type-S, the VTEC system operates on both the intake and exhaust valves, allowing both to benefit from multiple cam profiles. A modified K20C engine is used in motorsport, as the Sports Car Club of America Formula 3 and 4 series that run in North America both use a K20C engine, with the Formula 4 engine not having a turbocharger.

Another significant difference between K-series engines is the alignment of the crankshaft to the center line of the bore. The K20C1 engine block has an offset alignment. Engines that do not have their crank shaft aligned to the bore are known as Desaxe engines. On the K20C1 engine this allows the power stroke to have more leverage and less thrust waste on sidewalls.

K-series engine swaps, also known as "K-swaps", have increasingly gained popularity in the import scene, but also among hot rodders and kit car enthusiasts, because they can be put in longitudinal rear-wheel drive layouts.

== K20 ==
=== K20A (i-VTEC) ===
Honda K20A (i-VTEC)
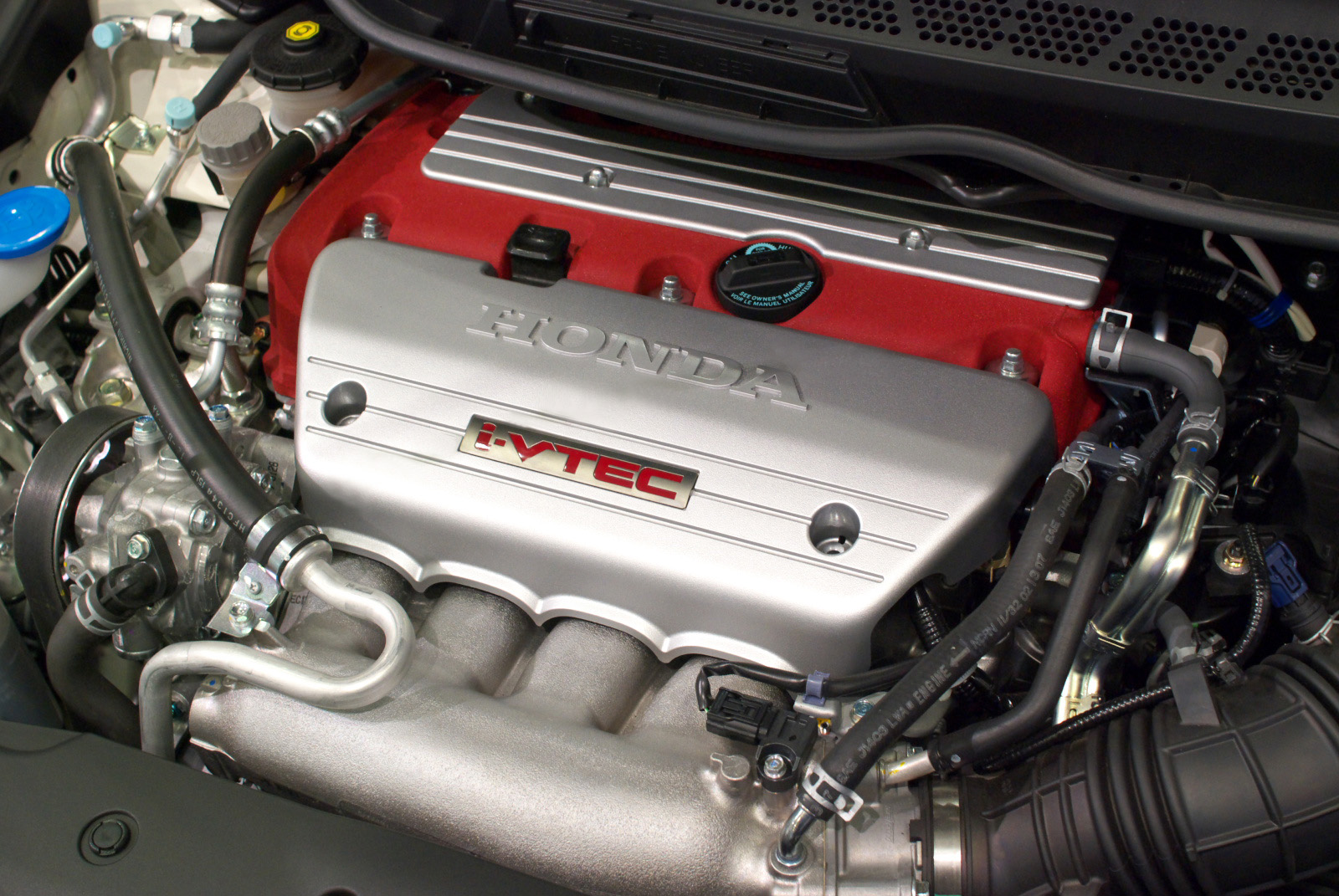

Overview
- Manufacturer: Honda Motor Co., Ltd.
- Production: 2001–2011

Layout
- Configuration: I4
- Displacement: 2.0 L; 121.9 cu in (1,998 cc)
- Cylinder bore: 86 mm (3.386 in)
- Piston stroke: 86 mm (3.386 in)
- Cylinder head material: NSH 14
- Valvetrain: DOHC 4 valves x cyl, with i-VTEC on some models
- Compression ratio: See left for specific application.

Combustion
- Fuel system: Fuel injection
- Management: ECU
- Fuel type: Petrol
- Cooling system: Water-cooled; Piston Oil Squirters (K24A)

Output
- Power output: See left for specific application.
- Torque output: See left for specific application.

Dimensions
- Dry weight: 403 pounds (183 kg) (with gearbox), 275 pounds (125 kg) (without gearbox)

Applications

Engine	Application	Compression	Power	Torque	Redline	Rev limiter	i-VTEC engagement	Intake Manifold
K20A (High Performance)	2001–2006 Honda Civic Type R (JDM)	11.5:1	212 hp (158 kW) at 8000 rpm	149 lb⋅ft (202 N⋅m) at 7000 rpm		8400 rpm	6000 rpm	PRC
K20A (High Performance)	2001–2006 Honda Integra Type R (JDM)	11.5:1	217 hp (162 kW) at 8000 rpm	152 lb⋅ft (206 N⋅m) at 7000 rpm	8400 rpm	8600 rpm	6000 rpm	PRC
K20A (High Performance)	2002–2008 Honda Accord Euro R (JDM)	11.5:1	217 hp (162 kW) at 8000 rpm	152 lb⋅ft (206 N⋅m) at 6000 rpm	8400 rpm	8600 rpm	6000 rpm	RBC
K20A (High Performance)	2007–2011 Honda Civic Type R (JDM)	11.7:1	221 hp (165 kW) at 8000 rpm	159 lb⋅ft (215 N⋅m) at 6100 rpm	8400 rpm	8600 rpm	5800 rpm	RRC
K20A (Eco)	2000–2006 Honda Stream (JDM) (RN3, FWD)	9.7:1	154 hp (115 kW) at 6500 rpm	139 lb⋅ft (188 N⋅m) at 4000 rpm	6800 rpm			PNC
K20A (Eco)	2000–2006 Honda Stream (JDM) (RN4, AWD)	9.8:1	156 hp (116 kW) at 6500 rpm	140 lb⋅ft (190 N⋅m) at 4000 rpm	6800 rpm	7000		PNC
K20A (Eco)	2001–2004 Honda CR-V (JDM)	9.8:1	150 hp (112 kW) at 6500 rpm	140 lb⋅ft (190 N⋅m) at 4000 rpm	6800 rpm			PNA
K20A (Eco)	2001–2006 Honda Integra Type S (JDM)	9.8:1	158 hp (118 kW) at 6500 rpm	141 lb⋅ft (191 N⋅m) at 4000 rpm	6800 rpm			PNC
K20A (Eco)	2001–2005 Honda Stepwgn (JDM)	9.8:1	158 hp (118 kW) at 6500 rpm	141 lb⋅ft (191 N⋅m) at 4000 rpm	6800 rpm			PNC
K20A (Eco)	2001–2005 Honda Stepwgn Spada (JDM)	9.7:1	158 hp (118 kW) at 6500 rpm	141 lb⋅ft (191 N⋅m) at 4000 rpm	6800 rpm			PNC
K20A (Eco)	2005–2009 Honda Stepwgn (JDM)	9.6:1	153 hp (114 kW) at 6000 rpm	139 lb⋅ft (188 N⋅m) at 4500 rpm	6800 rpm			RTA
K20A (Eco)	2002–2008 Honda Accord (JDM) (CL7-CM1, FWD)	9.8:1	153 hp (114 kW) at 6000 rpm	139 lb⋅ft (188 N⋅m) at 4500 rpm	6800 rpm			RAA
K20A (Eco)	2002–2008 Honda Accord (JDM) (CL8, AWD)	9.8:1	150 hp (112 kW) at 6000 rpm	137 lb⋅ft (186 N⋅m) at 4500 rpm	6800 rpm			RAA
K20A (Eco)	2004–2009 Honda Edix (JDM)	9.7:1	154 hp (115 kW) at 6500 rpm	139 lb⋅ft (188 N⋅m) at 4000 rpm	6800 rpm			PNC
K20A (Eco)	2005–2010 Honda Civic (JDM)	9.6:1	153 hp (114 kW) at 6000 rpm	139 lb⋅ft (188 N⋅m) at 4500 rpm	6800 rpm			RTB
K20A1	2001–2006 Honda Stream (RN3, FWD)	9.7:1	156 hp (116 kW) at 6500 rpm	139 lb⋅ft (188 N⋅m) at 4000 rpm	6800 rpm			PNA
K20A1	2001–2006 Honda Stream (RN4, AWD)	9.8:1	158 hp (118 kW) at 6500 rpm	140 lb⋅ft (190 N⋅m) at 4000 rpm	6800 rpm			PNC
K20A2	2001–2006 Honda Civic Type R (EDM)	11.0:1	200 hp (149 kW) at 7400 rpm	139 lb⋅ft (188 N⋅m) at 5900 rpm	7900 rpm	8250 rpm	5800 rpm	PRB
K20A2	2002–2004 Acura RSX Type S	11.0:1	200 hp (149 kW) at 7400 rpm	142 lb⋅ft (193 N⋅m) at 6000 rpm	7900 rpm	8250 rpm	5800 rpm	PRB
K20A2	2002–2004 Honda Integra Type R (AUDM/NZDM)	11.0:1	200 hp (149 kW) at 7400 rpm	142 lb⋅ft (193 N⋅m) at 6000 rpm	7800 rpm	8100 rpm	5800 rpm	
K20A3	2002–2006 Acura RSX	9.8:1	160 hp (119 kW) at 6500 rpm	142 lb⋅ft (193 N⋅m) at 4000 rpm	6800 rpm	7000 rpm	2300 rpm	PNC
K20A3	2002–2005 Honda Civic	9.8:1	160 hp (119 kW) at 6500 rpm	141 lb⋅ft (191 N⋅m) at 4000 rpm	6800 rpm	7000 rpm	2300 rpm	PRB
K20A3	2002–2005 Honda Civic Si USDM	9.8:1	160 hp (119 kW) at 6500 rpm	132 lb⋅ft (179 N⋅m) at 4000 rpm	6800 rpm	7000 rpm	2300 rpm	PRB
K20A3	2002–2005 Honda Civic Type S EDM	9.8:1	160 hp (119 kW) at 6500 rpm	132 lb⋅ft (179 N⋅m) at 4000 rpm	6800 rpm	7100 rpm	2200 rpm	PRB
K20A3	2003–2006 Honda Civic 2.0 i-VTEC (SEA)	9.8:1	155 hp (116 kW) at 6500 rpm	131 lb⋅ft (177 N⋅m) at 5000 rpm	6800 rpm	7000 rpm		PRB
K20A4	2002–2006 Honda CR-V	9.8:1	156 hp (116 kW) at 6500 rpm	140 lb⋅ft (190 N⋅m) at 4000 rpm	6800 rpm			PNA
K20A6	2003–2006 Honda Accord (EDM)	9.8:1	153 hp (114 kW) at 6500 rpm	140 lb⋅ft (190 N⋅m) at 4000 rpm	6800 rpm		2500 rpm	RAA
K20A6	2003–2006 Honda Accord (ADM)	9.8:1	153 hp (114 kW) at 6500 rpm	140 lb⋅ft (190 N⋅m) at 4000 rpm	6800 rpm		2500 rpm	RAA
K20A7	2003–2007 Honda Accord (SEA)	9.8:1	148 hp (110 kW) at 6000 rpm	137 lb⋅ft (186 N⋅m) at 4500 rpm	6800 rpm			RAA
K20A9	2004–2007 Honda FR-V (EDM)	9.8:1	148 hp (110 kW) at 6500 rpm	142 lb⋅ft (192 N⋅m) at 4000 rpm	6800 rpm		2500 rpm	PNC

Additional notes

K20A Spec R engine (FD2 Civic Type R)

- Chromoly flywheel, higher-tensile strength connecting rods, high-compression pistons, stiffer valve springs, higher-lift hollow camshafts with more duration, and 2007–2011 cylinder-head intake-port and exhaust-port surface polishing used in NSX-R. The JDM K20A type-R engine block would be removed from production assembly line by an experienced Honda engine technician to torque the connecting rod bolts to factory specification by hand using micrometer to measure connecting rod bolt stretching. Then the JDM K20A type-R engine block would be returned to the production assembly line to complete the engine building process.

=== K20B (i-VTEC I) ===
Honda K20B (i-VTEC I)

Overview
- Manufacturer: Honda Motor Co., Ltd.
- Production: 2003–2006

Layout
- Configuration: I4
- Displacement: 2.0 L; 121.9 cu in (1,998 cc)
- Cylinder bore: 86 mm (3.386 in)
- Piston stroke: 86 mm (3.386 in)
- Valvetrain: DOHC 4 valves x cyl, with i-VTEC I
- Compression ratio: 10.0:1

Combustion
- Fuel system: Direct fuel injection
- Management: ECU
- Fuel type: Gasoline
- Cooling system: Water-cooled

Output
- Power output: 156 hp (116 kW) at 6300 rpm
- Torque output: 139 lb⋅ft (188 N⋅m) at 4600 rpm

- Injection Pressure: 10 megapascals (99 atm)
- Center Fuel Injection with swirl guide
- Air-Fuel Ratio:
  - Normal driving cycle: 65:1 (ultra-lean combustion)
  - Acceleration/High load driving cycle: 14.7:1 (Stoichiometric)
- Deep Piston Cavity formed in top of Pistons
- Intake Manifold code: PPD
- Application: 2003–2006 Honda Stream Absolute

=== K20Z (i-VTEC) ===
Honda K20Z (i-VTEC)
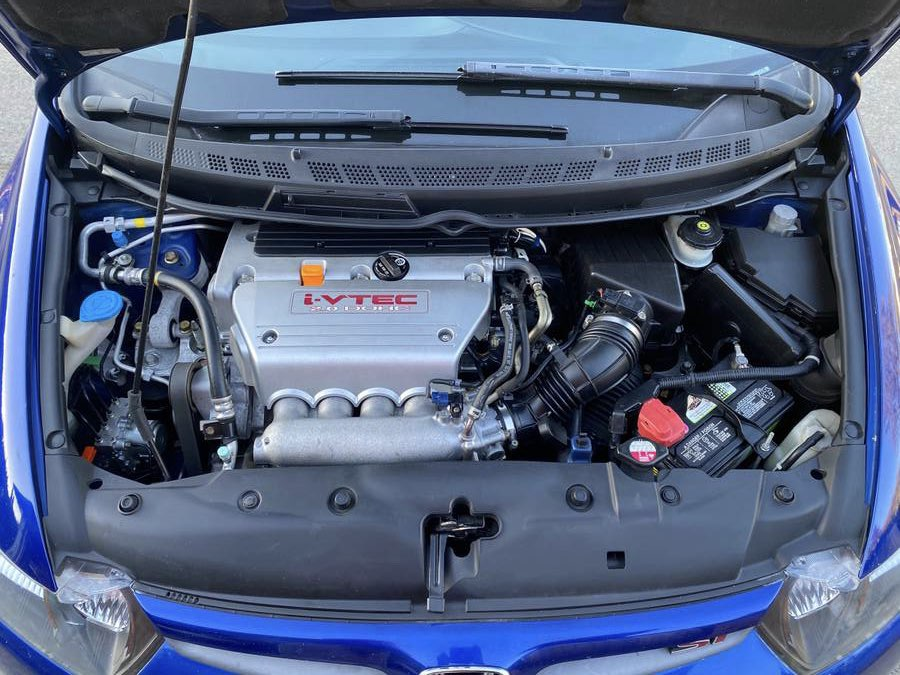

Overview
- Manufacturer: Honda Motor Co., Ltd.
- Production: 2005–2015

Layout
- Configuration: I4
- Displacement: 2.0 L; 121.9 cu in (1,998 cc)
- Cylinder bore: 86 mm (3.386 in)
- Piston stroke: 86 mm (3.386 in)
- Valvetrain: DOHC 4 valves x cyl, with i-VTEC on some models
- Compression ratio: See left for specific application.

Combustion
- Fuel system: Fuel injection
- Management: ECU
- Fuel type: Gasoline
- Cooling system: Water-cooled

Output
- Power output: See left for specific application.
- Torque output: See left for specific application.

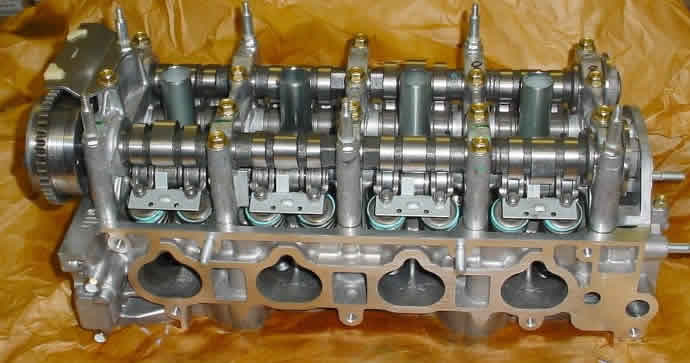
A cylinder head from a Honda K20Z3. Components of the i-VTEC system can be seen.

Applications

Engine	Application	Compression	Power	Torque	Redline	Rev limiter	i-VTEC engagement	Intake Manifold
K20Z1	2005–2006 Acura RSX Type S	11.0:1	210 hp (157 kW) at 7800 rpm (Note: SAE BHP measurement changes from 2005 to 2006. Thus, reducing the 2006 Acura RSX Type S rating from 210 hp (160 kW) to 201 hp (150 kW) on paper.)	143 lb⋅ft (194 N⋅m) at 6200 rpm	8100 rpm	8300 rpm	5800 rpm	PRB
K20Z1	2005–2006 Honda Integra Type S (AUDM/NZDM)	11.0:1	210 hp (160 kW) at 7800 rpm	143 lb⋅ft (194 N⋅m) at 6200 rpm	8100 rpm	8300 rpm	5800 rpm	
K20Z2	2006–2011 Acura CSX	9.8:1	153 hp (114 kW) at 6000 rpm	139 lb⋅ft (188 N⋅m) at 4500 rpm	6800 rpm			
K20Z2	2006–2008 Honda Accord (EDM)	9.8:1	153 hp (114 kW) at 6000 rpm	139 lb⋅ft (188 N⋅m) at 4500 rpm	6800 rpm			RBA
K20Z2	2006–2010 Honda Civic (SEA)	9.8:1	153 hp (114 kW) at 6000 rpm	139 lb⋅ft (188 N⋅m) at 4500 rpm	6800 rpm			RTB
K20Z3	2006–2011 Honda Civic Si	11.0:1	197 hp (147 kW) at 7800 rpm (Note: SAE net Rev 8/04)	139 lb⋅ft (188 N⋅m) at 6200 rpm	8000 rpm	8300 rpm	5800 rpm	RBC (Note: The RBC is not a variable-length intake.)
K20Z3	2007–2010 Acura CSX Type S	11.0:1	197 hp (147 kW) at 7800 rpm	139 lb⋅ft (188 N⋅m) at 6200 rpm	8000 rpm	8300 rpm	5800 rpm	
K20Z4	2007–2010 Honda Civic Type R (EDM)	11.0:1	198 hp (148 kW) at 7800 rpm	142 lb⋅ft (193 N⋅m) at 5600 rpm	8000 rpm	8200 rpm	5400 rpm	RSP
K20Z5	2007–2010 Honda Civic Si (BDM)	11.0:1	192 hp (143 kW) at 7800 rpm	136 lb⋅ft (184 N⋅m) at 6800 rpm	8000 rpm	8200 rpm	5400 rpm	

Additional notes

K20Z3 (as fitted to Ariel's Atom 3.5)

- The K20Z3 has Honda's traditional performance VTEC on the intake and the exhaust cams, as found on previous generation of engines. Variable cam timing technology is included on the intake but not the exhaust cams. The added timing control corresponds to the "i" in i-VTEC.

=== K20C (Earth Dreams VTEC Turbo) ===
K20C (Earth Dreams VTEC Turbo)
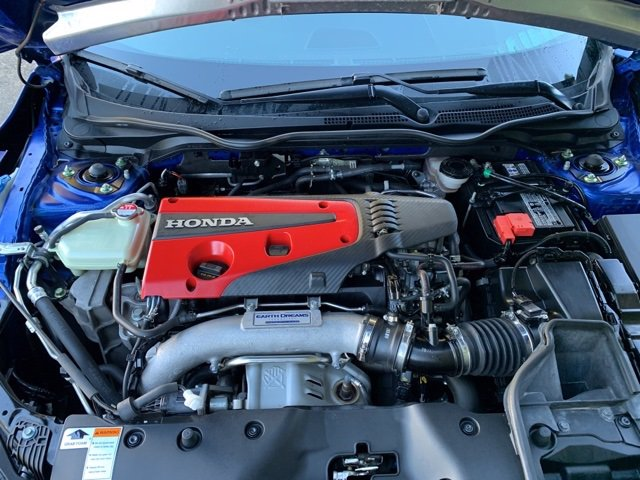

Overview
- Manufacturer: Honda Motor Co., Ltd.
- Production: 2015–present

Layout
- Configuration: I4
- Displacement: 2.0 L; 121.8 cu in (1,996 cc)
- Cylinder bore: 86 mm (3.386 in)
- Piston stroke: 85.9 mm (3.382 in)
- Cylinder block material: Aluminium
- Cylinder head material: Aluminium
- Valvetrain: DOHC 4 valves x cyl, with VTEC/i-VTEC
- Compression ratio: See left for specific application.

Combustion
- Turbocharger: Single
- Fuel system: Direct fuel injection
- Management: ECU
- Fuel type: Gasoline
- Cooling system: Water-cooled

Output
- Power output: See left for specific application.
- Torque output: See left for specific application.

Applications

Engine	Application	Compression	Power	Torque	Redline	Rev limiter	i-VTEC engagement
K20C1	2015–2017 Honda Civic Type R (EDM); 2017–2021 Honda Civic Type R (USDM); 2018–present Ariel Atom 4; 2023–present Honda Civic Type R (USDM); Formula Regional Americas Championship	9.8:1	306–315 hp (228–235 kW) at 6500 rpm	295–310 lb⋅ft (400–420 N⋅m) at 2500–4000 rpm	7000 rpm	7000 rpm	
K20C3	2016–2023 Honda Avancier/UR-V (China)	9.8:1	268 hp (200 kW) at 6500 rpm	273 lb⋅ft (370 N⋅m) at 4200 rpm			6100 rpm
K20C4	2018–2022 Honda Accord (Sport, EX-L & Touring 2.0T trims)	9.8:1	252 hp (188 kW) at 6500 rpm	273 lb⋅ft (370 N⋅m) at 1500–4000 rpm	6800 rpm		
K20C4	2019–present Acura RDX	9.8:1	272 hp (203 kW) at 6500 rpm	280 lb⋅ft (380 N⋅m) at 1600–4500 rpm	6800 rpm		
K20C5	2019–present Acura RDX (China)	9.8:1	265 hp (195 kW) at 6500 rpm	280 lb⋅ft (380 N⋅m) at 3000–4000 rpm	6800 rpm		
K20C6	2021–2025 Acura TLX	9.8:1	272 hp (203 kW) at 6500 rpm	280 lb⋅ft (380 N⋅m) at 1600–4500 rpm	6800 rpm		
K20C7	2023–present Honda Avancier/UR-V (China, facelift models)	9.8:1	261 hp (192 kW) at 6,500 rpm	273 lb⋅ft (370 N⋅m) at 2,250–3,500 rpm			
K20C8	2024–present Acura Integra Type S	9.8:1	320 hp (239 kW) at 6500 rpm	310 lb⋅ft (420 N⋅m) at 2600–4000 rpm	7000 rpm		

Additional notes

- Earth Dreams Technology
- K20C1: First Honda Type R engine to be built in the US at the Honda Anna Engine Plant in Anna, Ohio. First time Honda has used a turbocharger on the Type R.
- K20C5: All Acura RDX sold in China (manufactured by GAC Acura)
- Although the K20C4 in the Acura RDX and the K20C6 in the Acura TLX share the same internals, they are named differently due to different engine mount points to accommodate the sedan body of the TLX.
- The VTEC mechanism is available only on the exhaust valves.
- K20C1 engines have an offset of 8mm on the crankshaft from the centerline of the bore.
- K20C8 (Acura Integra Type S): Engine is identical to the K20C1, it is named differently to accommodate different mounting points.
- K20C7: Based on K20C3, but detuned to meet Chinese VI-b regulations

=== K20C & K20Z (Earth Dreams i-VTEC) ===
K20C & K20Z (Earth Dreams i-VTEC)
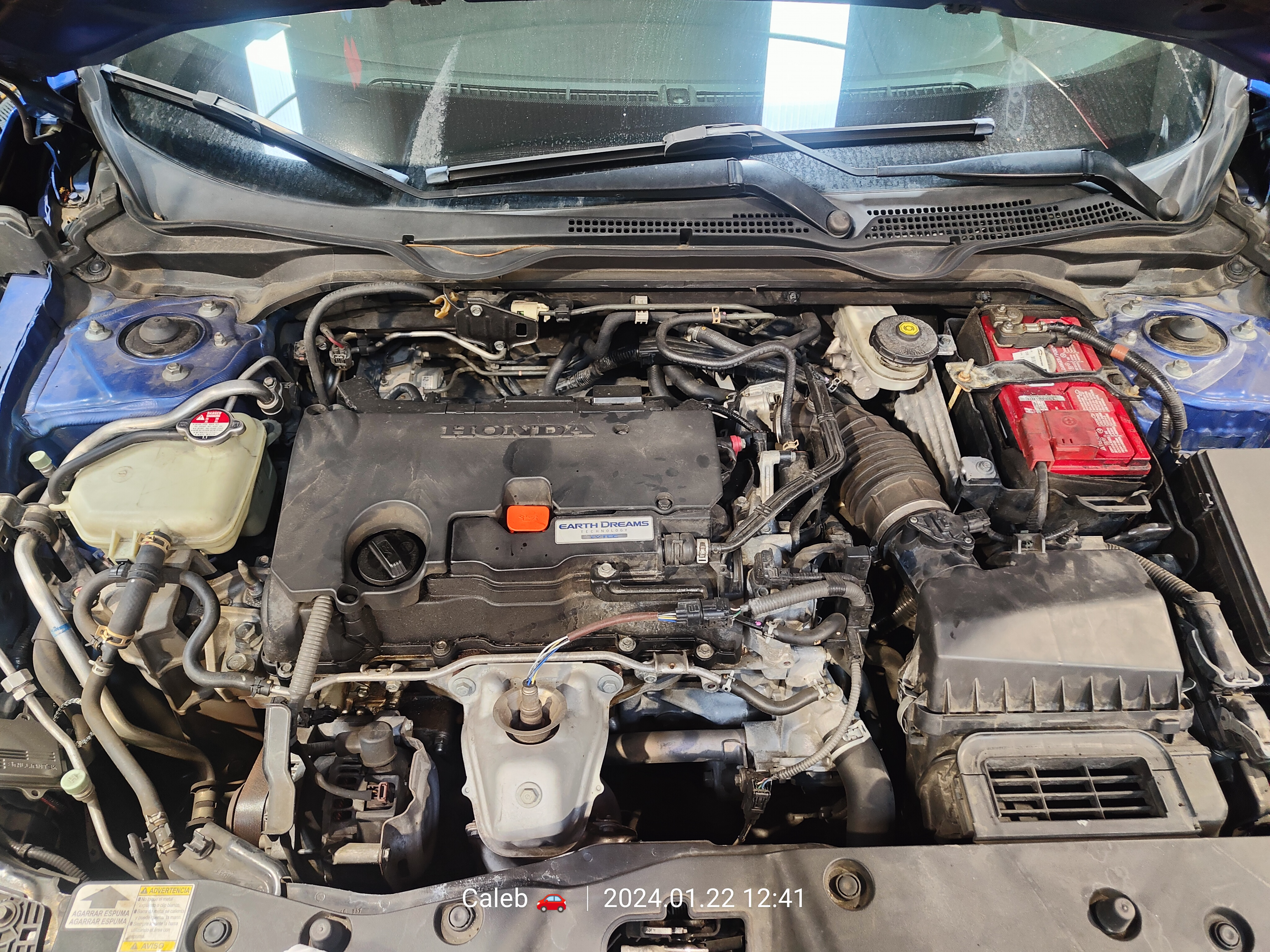

Overview
- Manufacturer: Honda Motor Co., Ltd.
- Production: 2016–present

Layout
- Configuration: I4
- Displacement: 2.0 L; 121.8 cu in (1,996 cc); 2.0 L; 121.6 cu in (1,993 cc)
- Cylinder bore: 86 mm (3.386 in); 81 mm (3.189 in)
- Piston stroke: 85.9 mm (3.382 in); 96.7 mm (3.807 in)
- Cylinder block material: Aluminium
- Cylinder head material: Aluminium
- Valvetrain: DOHC 4 valves x cyl, with i-VTEC or Dual VTC
- Compression ratio: See left for specific application.

Combustion
- Fuel system: Port Injection (Multi-point Injection)
- Management: ECU
- Fuel type: Gasoline
- Cooling system: Water-cooled

Output
- Power output: See left for specific application.
- Torque output: See left for specific application.

Applications

Engine	Application	Compression	Power	Torque	Redline	Rev limiter	i-VTEC engagement
K20C2	2016–2018 Honda Civic (LX & EX) Sedan (USDM) 2019–2024 Honda Civic (LX & Sport) Sedan (USDM) 2016–2020 Honda Civic (LX, LX-P, Sport) Coupe (USDM) 2022–2024 Honda Civic (LX, Sport) Hatchback (USDM)	10.8:1	158 hp (118 kW) at 6500 rpm	138 lb⋅ft (187 N⋅m) at 4200 rpm	6700 rpm	7000 rpm	6100 rpm (Manual); 6500 rpm (CVT)
K20C2	2016–2023 Formula 4 United States Championship	10.8:1	158 hp (118 kW) at 6500 rpm	138 lb⋅ft (187 N⋅m) at 4200 rpm	6800 rpm	7000 rpm	6100 rpm
K20C9	2025–present Honda Civic (LX & Sport) (USDM)	13.0:1	150 hp (112 kW) at 6400 rpm	133 lb⋅ft (180 N⋅m) at 4000–5000 rpm	6700 rpm		
K20Z5	2023–present Honda HR-V (USDM)	10.8:1	158 hp (118 kW) at 6500 rpm	138 lb⋅ft (187 N⋅m) at 4200 rpm	6800 rpm		

Additional notes

- The K20C9 is a Dual VTC Atkinson cycle engine and uses direct injection.

== K23 ==
=== K23A (i-VTEC Turbo) ===
Honda K23A (i-VTEC Turbo)
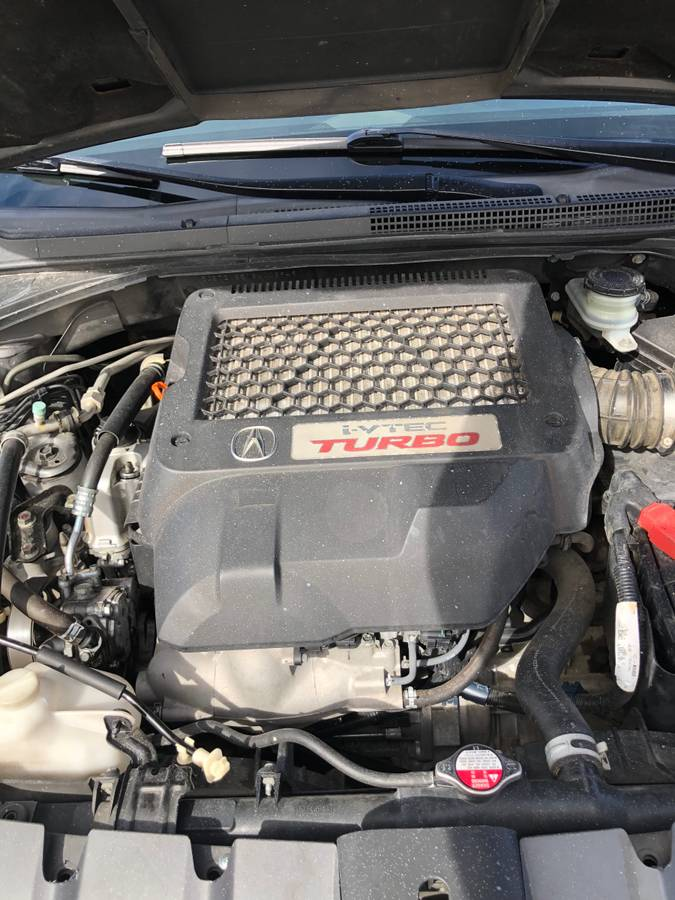

Overview
- Manufacturer: Honda Motor Co., Ltd.
- Production: 2007–2012

Layout
- Configuration: I4
- Displacement: 2.3 L; 140.4 cu in (2,300 cc)
- Cylinder bore: 86 mm (3.386 in)
- Piston stroke: 99 mm (3.898 in)
- Cylinder block material: Aluminium
- Cylinder head material: Aluminium
- Valvetrain: DOHC 4 Valves x Cyl, with i-VTEC
- Compression ratio: 8.8:1

Combustion
- Turbocharger: 1
- Fuel system: Fuel injection
- Management: ECU
- Fuel type: Gasoline
- Cooling system: Water-cooled

Output
- Power output: 240 hp (180 kW) at 6000 rpm
- Torque output: 260 lb⋅ft (350 N⋅m) at 4500 rpm

Applications

Engine	Application	Compression	Power	Torque	Redline	Rev limiter	i-VTEC engagement	Intake Manifold
K23A1	2007–2012 Acura RDX	8.8:1	240 hp (179 kW) at 6000 rpm	260 lb⋅ft (353 N⋅m) at 4500 rpm	6800 rpm	6900 rpm	2500 rpm	

Additional notes

- This version of the K engine uses a Mitsubishi TD04HL-15T turbocharger with a dual path turbine housing, optimizing low end response while allowing better high end flow. Maximum boost pressure is 13.5psi. The engine includes i-VTEC and VTC technologies and comes mated to a version of Honda's 5-speed automatic with SH-AWD (note: SH-AWD was standard from 2007–2009 and optional from 2010–2012).

== K24 ==
=== K24A (i-VTEC) ===
Honda K24A (i-VTEC)
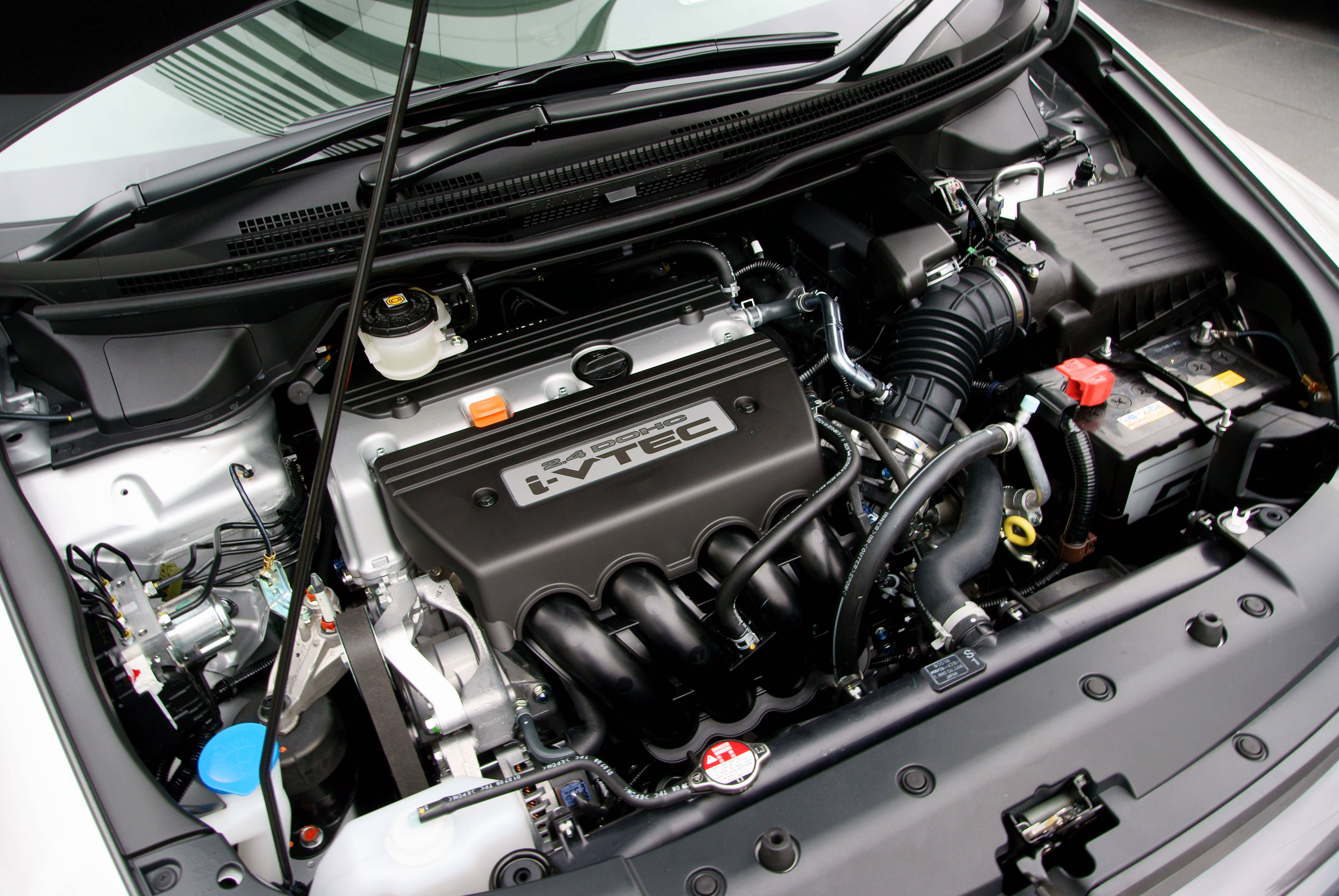

Overview
- Manufacturer: Honda Motor Co., Ltd.
- Production: 2001–2016

Layout
- Configuration: I4
- Displacement: 2.4 L; 143.6 cu in (2,354 cc)
- Cylinder bore: 87 mm (3.425 in)
- Piston stroke: 99 mm (3.898 in)
- Valvetrain: DOHC 4 valves x cyl, with i-VTEC
- Compression ratio: See left for specific application.

Combustion
- Fuel system: Fuel injection
- Management: ECU
- Fuel type: Gasoline
- Cooling system: Water-cooled

Output
- Power output: See left for specific application.
- Torque output: See left for specific application.

Engine	Application	Compression	Power	Torque	Redline	Rev limiter	i-VTEC engagement	Intake Manifold
K24A	2002–2008 Honda Accord 24T, 24TL, 24S and Type-S (JDM) (CL9/CM2, FWD)	10.5:1	197 hp (147 kW) at 6800 rpm	171 lb⋅ft (232 N⋅m) at 4500 rpm	7100 rpm (Note: Automatic: 7100 rpm Sequential Sportshift: 7300 rpm Manual: 7600 rpm)	7200 rpm	6000 rpm	RBB
K24A	2002–2008 Honda Accord 24T (JDM) (CM3, AWD)	10.5:1	187 hp (140 kW) at 6800 rpm	168 lb⋅ft (228 N⋅m) at 4500 rpm	7100 rpm	7200 rpm	6000 rpm	RBB
K24A	2008–2013 Honda Accord 24E, 24IL, 24TL and Type-S (JDM) (CU2/CW2, FWD)	11:1 (R40)	203 hp (152 kW) at 7000 rpm	171 lb⋅ft (232 N⋅m) at 4300 rpm			5000 rpm	R40
K24A	2003–2008 Honda Odyssey Absolute (JDM) (RB1, FWD)	10.5:1	197 hp (147 kW) at 6800 rpm	171 lb⋅ft (232 N⋅m) at 4500 rpm	7100 rpm	7200 rpm	6000 rpm	RBB
K24A	2003–2008 Honda Odyssey Absolute (JDM) (RB2, AWD)	10.5:1	187 hp (140 kW) at 6800 rpm	168 lb⋅ft (228 N⋅m) at 4500 rpm	7100 rpm	7200 rpm	6000 rpm	RBB
K24A	2008–2013 Honda Odyssey (JDM) (RB3/RB4)	10.0:1	170 hp (127 kW) at 6000 rpm	164 lb⋅ft (222 N⋅m) at 4300 rpm				
K24A	2008–2013 Honda Odyssey Absolute (JDM) (RB3, FWD) (K24A R40)	11:1 (R40)	203 hp (152 kW) at 7000 rpm (Note: Using unleaded premium gasoline)	171 lb⋅ft (232 N⋅m) at 4300 rpm			5000 rpm	R40
K24A	2008–2013 Honda Odyssey Absolute (JDM) (RB4, AWD) (K24A R40)	11:1 (R40)	201 hp (150 kW) at 7000 rpm	170 lb⋅ft (230 N⋅m) at 4300 rpm				R40
K24A	2003–2005 Honda Element (JDM)	9.7:1	158 hp (118 kW) at 5500 rpm	161 lb⋅ft (218 N⋅m) at 4500 rpm				PZD
K24A	2003–2008 Honda Odyssey (JDM)	9.7:1	158 hp (118 kW) at 5500 rpm	161 lb⋅ft (218 N⋅m) at 4500 rpm				RAA
K24A	2008–2013 Honda Odyssey (JDM)	10:1	171 hp (127 kW) at 6000 rpm	164 lb⋅ft (222 N⋅m) at 4300 rpm				RAA
K24A	2003–2005 Honda Stepwgn Spada 24T (JDM)	9.6:1	160 hp (119 kW) at 6000 rpm	162 lb⋅ft (220 N⋅m) at 3600 rpm				
K24A	2004–2013 Honda Elysion (JDM)	9.7:1	158 hp (118 kW) at 5500 rpm	161 lb⋅ft (218 N⋅m) at 4500 rpm				
K24A	2006–2009 Honda Edix 24S (JDM)	9.7:1	160 hp (119 kW) at 5700 rpm	161 lb⋅ft (218 N⋅m) at 4000 rpm				
K24A	2005–2006 Honda CR-V (JDM)	9.6:1	158 hp (118 kW) at 6000 rpm	162 lb⋅ft (220 N⋅m) at 3600 rpm	6500 rpm	7000 rpm		PPA
K24A	2006–2011 Honda CR-V (JDM)	9.7:1	168 hp (125 kW) at 5800 rpm	162 lb⋅ft (220 N⋅m) at 4200 rpm				
K24A	2011–2016 Honda CR-V (JDM)	10:1	187 hp (140 kW) at 7000 rpm	164 lb⋅ft (222 N⋅m) at 4400 rpm				
K24A1	2002–2006 Honda CR-V	9.6:1	160 hp (119 kW) at 6000 rpm	162 lb⋅ft (220 N⋅m) at 3600 rpm	6500 rpm	7000 rpm	2750 rpm	PPA
K24A2	2004–2005 Acura TSX	10.5:1	200 hp (149 kW) at 6800 rpm	166 lb⋅ft (225 N⋅m) at 4500 rpm	7100 rpm	7200 rpm	6000 rpm	RBB
K24A2	2006–2008 Acura TSX	10.5:1	205 hp (153 kW) at 7000 rpm	164 lb⋅ft (222 N⋅m) at 4500 rpm	7100 rpm	7200 rpm	6000 rpm	RBB
K24A3	2003–2007 Honda Accord (EDM)	10.5:1	187 hp (140 kW) at 6800 rpm	171 lb⋅ft (232 N⋅m) at 4500 rpm	7200 rpm	7300 rpm	6000 rpm	RBB
K24A3	2003–2007 Honda Accord Euro (AUDM/NZDM)	10.5:1	187 hp (140 kW) at 6800 rpm	171 lb⋅ft (232 N⋅m) at 4500 rpm	7200 rpm	7300 rpm	6000 rpm	RBB
K24A4	2003–2005 Honda Accord (USDM)	9.7:1	160 hp (119 kW) at 5500 rpm	161 lb⋅ft (218 N⋅m) at 4500 rpm	6500 rpm		3500rpm	RAA
K24A4	2003–2008 Honda Odyssey	9.7:1	160 hp (119 kW) at 5500 rpm	161 lb⋅ft (218 N⋅m) at 4500 rpm	6500 rpm			RAA
K24A4	2003–2006 Honda Element	9.7:1	160 hp (119 kW) at 5500 rpm	161 lb⋅ft (218 N⋅m) at 4500 rpm	6500 rpm			PZD
K24A8	2006–2007 Honda Accord (USDM)	9.7:1	166 hp (124 kW) at 5800 rpm	160 lb⋅ft (217 N⋅m) at 4000 rpm	6500 rpm		2400/4500 rpm (Note: 2400 rpm While in fuel efficiency mode. 4500 rpm in performance mode.)	RAA
K24A8	2007–2011 Honda Element	9.7:1	166 hp (124 kW) at 5800 rpm	161 lb⋅ft (218 N⋅m) at 4000 rpm	6800 rpm		2400/4500 rpm	PZD

Additional notes

K24A2 (2006–2008 Acura TSX)

- Increased intake flow:
  - Intake valve + 1 mm oversize (Intake valve head measures 36mm, but valve seat still measures 35mm)
  - Intake cam High lift lobe with 0.9 mm more lift and 12 degrees more duration
  - Throttle body increased from 60–64 mm
  - Radius on some intake pipes increased from 70–80 mm
- Increased exhaust flow
  - Exhaust Head pipe increased from 60–65 mm
  - Higher flow catalytic converter
  - Main (single) exhaust pipe increased from 54–57 mm
  - Rear (twin) pipes increased in diameter from 42.5 to 45 mm
- Block improvements:
  - Additional air passages in crankcase for reduced pumping losses
- Others
  - Stronger connecting rods
  - Under-piston oil squirters

=== K24Z & K24Y (i-VTEC) ===
Honda K24Z & K24Y (i-VTEC)

Overview
- Manufacturer: Honda Motor Co., Ltd.
- Production: 2007–2015

Layout
- Configuration: I4
- Displacement: 2.4 L; 143.6 cu in (2,354 cc)
- Cylinder bore: 87 mm (3.425 in)
- Piston stroke: 99 mm (3.898 in)
- Valvetrain: DOHC 4 valves x cyl, with i-VTEC
- Compression ratio: See left for specific application.

Combustion
- Fuel system: Fuel injection
- Management: ECU
- Fuel type: Gasoline
- Cooling system: Water-cooled

Output
- Power output: See left for specific application.
- Torque output: See left for specific application.

Applications

Engine	Application	Compression	Power	Torque	Redline	Rev limiter	i-VTEC engagement	Intake Manifold
K24Z1	2007–2009 Honda CR-V (RE3, RE4)	9.7:1	166 hp (124 kW) at 5800 rpm	161 lb⋅ft (218 N⋅m) at 4200 rpm	6500 rpm			
K24Z2	2008–2012 Honda Accord LX/LX-P (USDM/CDM)	10.5:1	177 hp (132 kW) at 6500 rpm	161 lb⋅ft (218 N⋅m) at 4300 rpm	6800 rpm	7100 rpm	5100 rpm	
K24Z2	2016–2020 Proton Perdana	10.5:1	177 hp (132 kW) at 6500 rpm	161 lb⋅ft (218 N⋅m) at 4300 rpm	6800 rpm	7100 rpm		
K24Z3	2008–2012 Honda Accord LX-S/EX/EX-L (USDM/CDM)	10.5:1	190 hp (142 kW) at 7000 rpm	162 lb⋅ft (220 N⋅m) at 4400 rpm	7100 rpm		5100 rpm	
K24Z3	2009–2014 Acura TSX and Honda Accord (Europe) (CU2/CW2)	11.0:1	201 hp (150 kW) at 7000 rpm	172 lb⋅ft (233 N⋅m) at 4300 rpm	7100 rpm	7300 rpm	5000 rpm	R40
K24Z4	2008–2012 Honda CR-V (RE7)	9.7:1	161 hp (120 kW) at 5800 rpm	161 lb⋅ft (218 N⋅m) at 4200 rpm	6500 rpm			
K24Z5	2010–2015 Honda Spirior	10.5:1	184 hp (137 kW) at 6500 rpm	164 lb⋅ft (222 N⋅m) at 4300 rpm	6500 rpm			
K24Z6	2010–2011 Honda CR-V (USDM/CDM)	10.5:1	180 hp (134 kW) at 6800 rpm	161 lb⋅ft (218 N⋅m) at 4400 rpm	7100 rpm	7200 rpm		
K24Z7	2012–2013 Honda Civic Si	11.0:1	201 hp (150 kW) at 7000 rpm	170 lb⋅ft (230 N⋅m) at 4400 rpm	7000 rpm	7200 rpm	5200 rpm	
K24Z7	2014–2015 Honda Civic Si	11.0:1	205 hp (153 kW) at 7000 rpm	174 lb⋅ft (236 N⋅m) at 4400 rpm	7000 rpm	7500 rpm	5000 rpm	
K24Z7	2013–2015 Acura ILX	11.0:1	201 hp (150 kW) at 7000 rpm	170 lb⋅ft (230 N⋅m) at 4400 rpm	7100 rpm	7200 rpm		
K24Z7	2012–2014 Honda CR-V (USDM/CDM)	10.0:1	185 hp (138 kW) at 7000 rpm	163 lb⋅ft (221 N⋅m) at 4400 rpm	7000 rpm	7200 rpm	5000 rpm	
K24Y1	2012–2014 Honda CR-V (Thailand)	10.5:1	170 hp (127 kW) at 6000 rpm	162 lbf⋅ft (220 N⋅m) at 4300 rpm	6500 rpm			
K24Y2	2012–2015 Honda Crosstour	10.0:1	192 hp (143 kW) at 7000 rpm	162 lb⋅ft (220 N⋅m) at 4400 rpm	7100 rpm			

=== K24W & K24V (Earth Dreams i-VTEC) ===
Honda K24W & K24V (Earth Dreams i-VTEC)
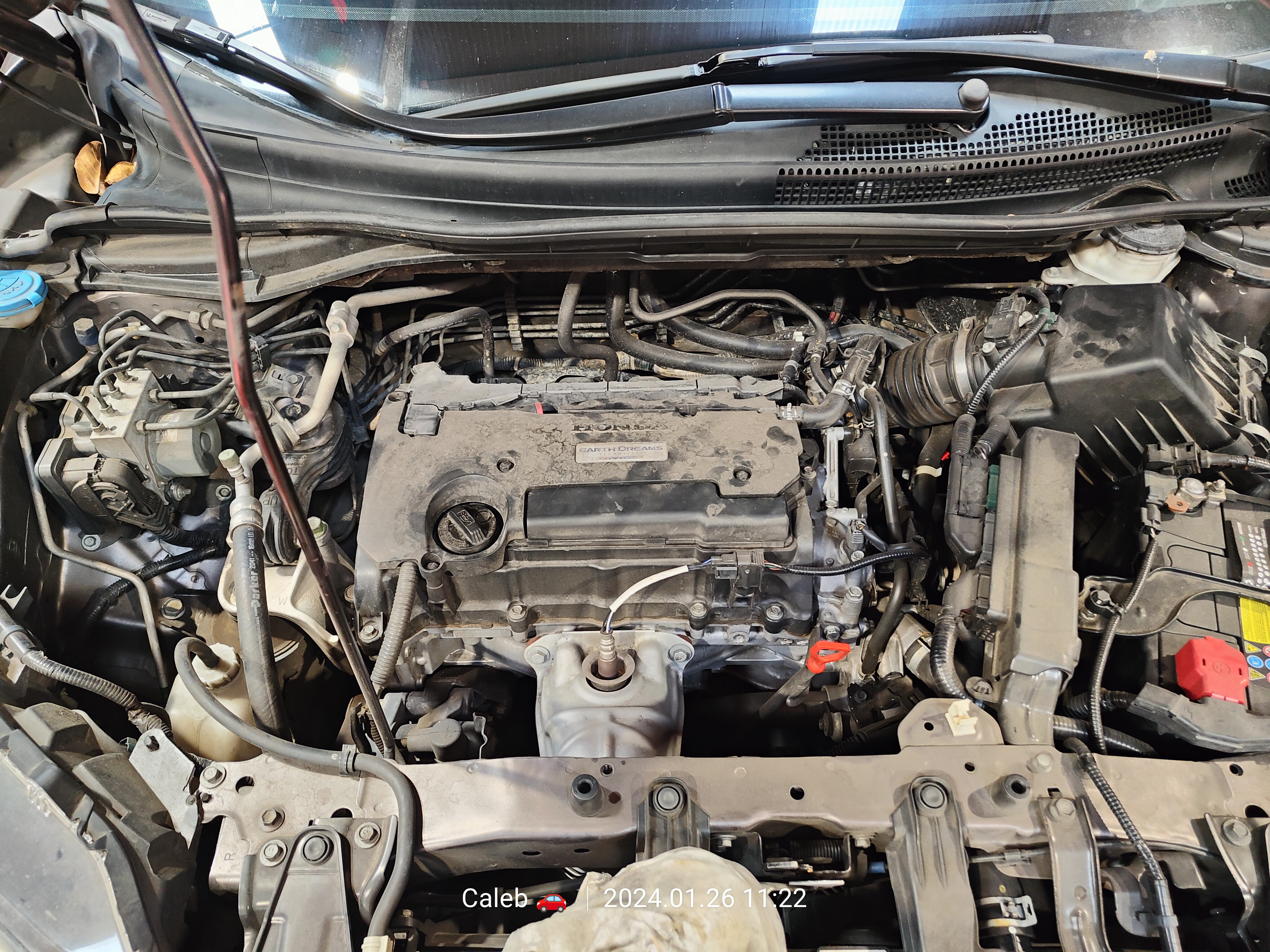

Overview
- Manufacturer: Honda Motor Co., Ltd.
- Production: 2013–present

Layout
- Configuration: I4
- Displacement: 2.4 L; 143.8 cu in (2,356 cc)
- Cylinder bore: 87 mm (3.425 in)
- Piston stroke: 99 mm (3.898 in)
- Valvetrain: DOHC 4 valves x cyl, with i-VTEC
- Compression ratio: See left for specific application.

Combustion
- Fuel system: See left for specific application.
- Management: ECU
- Fuel type: Gasoline
- Cooling system: Water-cooled

Output
- Power output: See left for specific application.
- Torque output: See left for specific application.

Dimensions
- Length: 30cm

Direct Injection, i-VTEC (intake camshaft & valvetrain)

Applications

Engine	Application	Compression	Fuel Injection	Power	Torque	Redline	i-VTEC engagement	Intake Manifold
K24W	2013–present Honda Odyssey (JDM)	11.1:1	Multi Point	185 hp (138 kW) at 6400 rpm	173 lb⋅ft (235 N⋅m) at 4000 rpm	6800 rpm	4800 rpm	
K24W1	2013–2017 Honda Accord (USDM)	11.1:1	Direct	185 hp (138 kW) at 6400 rpm	181 lb⋅ft (245 N⋅m) at 3900 rpm	6800 rpm	4800 rpm	
K24W1	2013–2017 Honda Accord Sport (USDM)	11.1:1	Direct	189 hp (141 kW) at 6400 rpm	182 lb⋅ft (247 N⋅m) at 3900 rpm	6800 rpm	4800 rpm	
K24W4	2013–2018 Honda Accord (Thailand/Malaysia)	10.1:1	Multi Point	174 hp (130 kW) at 6200 rpm	166 lb⋅ft (225 N⋅m) at 4000 rpm	6500 rpm		
K24W4	2013–present Honda Odyssey (International model excl. Japan)	10.1:1	Multi Point	174 hp (130 kW) at 6200 rpm	166 lb⋅ft (225 N⋅m) at 4000 rpm	6500 rpm		
K24W7	2015–2020 Acura TLX	11.6:1	Direct	206 hp (154 kW) at 6800 rpm	182 lb⋅ft (247 N⋅m) at 3900 rpm	7000 rpm	5000 rpm ±100 rpm	
K24W7	2015–2018 Honda Spirior Si	11.6:1	Direct	202 hp (151 kW) at 6800 rpm	182 lb⋅ft (247 N⋅m) at 3900 rpm	7000 rpm	5000 rpm ±100 rpm	
K24W9	2015–2019 Honda CR-V (USDM)	11.1:1	Direct	185 hp (138 kW) at 6400 rpm	181 lb⋅ft (245 N⋅m) at 3900 rpm	6800 rpm	4800 rpm	
K24V5	2015–2016 Honda CR-V (Thailand)	10.1:1	Multi Point	174 hp (130 kW) at 6200 rpm	166 lb⋅ft (225 N⋅m) at 4000 rpm	6500 rpm		
K24V5	2017–2022 Honda CR-V (Thailand)	10.1:1	Multi Point	170 hp (127 kW) at 6200 rpm	165 lb⋅ft (224 N⋅m) at 4000 rpm	6500 rpm		
K24V7	2016–2022 Acura ILX	11.6:1	Direct	201 hp (150 kW) at 6800 rpm	180 lb⋅ft (240 N⋅m) at 3800 rpm	7000 rpm	5000 rpm ±100 rpm	
