= Honda Element =

Compact crossover SUV by Honda, 2003–2011

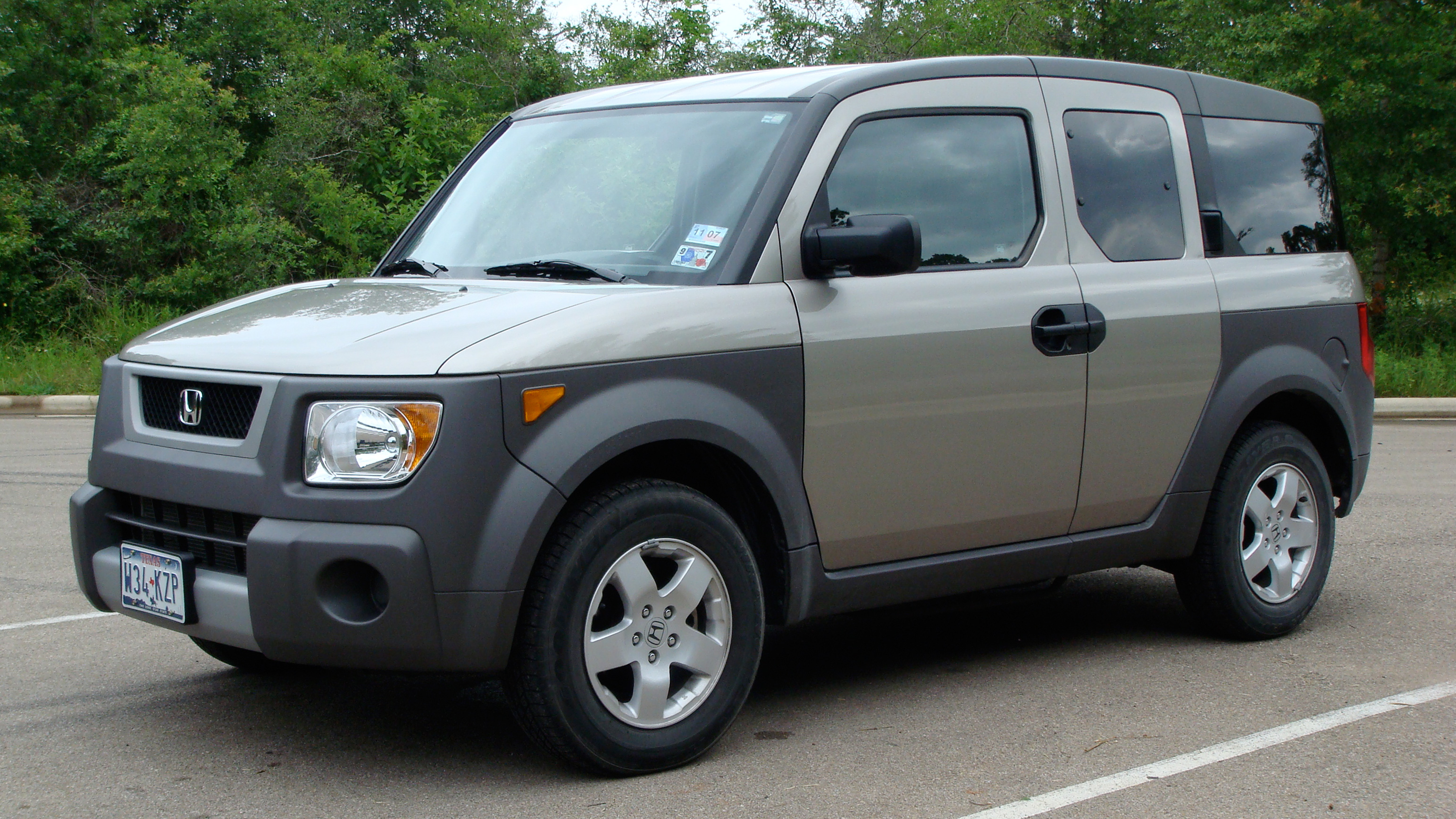

Overview
- Manufacturer: Honda
- Model code: YH1/2
- Production: December 2002 – April 2011
- Model years: 2003–2011
- Assembly: United States: East Liberty, Ohio (ELP)
- Designer: Eric Schumaker, Bernie Lee (exterior); Jose Wyszogrod (interior)

Body and chassis
- Class: Compact crossover SUV
- Body style: 5-door SUV
- Layout: Front-engine, front-wheel-drive; Front-engine, four-wheel-drive
- Related: Honda CR-V

Powertrain
- Engine: 2.4 L K24A4 I4 (2003–2006); 2.4 L K24A8 I4 (2007-2011)
- Transmission: 5-speed manual (2003-2010); 4-speed automatic (2003-2006); 5-speed automatic (2007-2011)

Dimensions
- Wheelbase: 2,576 mm (101.4 in)
- Length: 4,300 mm (169.3 in) (2003–2008); 4,315 mm (169.9 in) (2009–2011)
- Width: 1,829 mm (72.0 in) (2003–2008)
- Height: 1,788 mm (70.4 in); 1,765 mm (69.5 in) (SC)
- Curb weight: 1,510–1,652 kg (3,330–3,641 lb)

The Honda Element (Japanese: ホンダ・エレメント, Hepburn: Honda Eremento) is a compact crossover SUV manufactured by Honda and marketed in North America over a single generation for model years 2003–2011, and noted for its boxy exterior styling with bi-parting side doors and its boxy, flexible interior layout.

Manufactured in East Liberty, Ohio, the Element used a modified second generation CR-V platform with front-wheel or a system marketed as “real time 4-wheel drive” that sends some torque to the rear wheels if the front wheels lose traction.

In late 2010, shortly before its discontinuation, production had totaled approximately 325,000.

== Overview ==
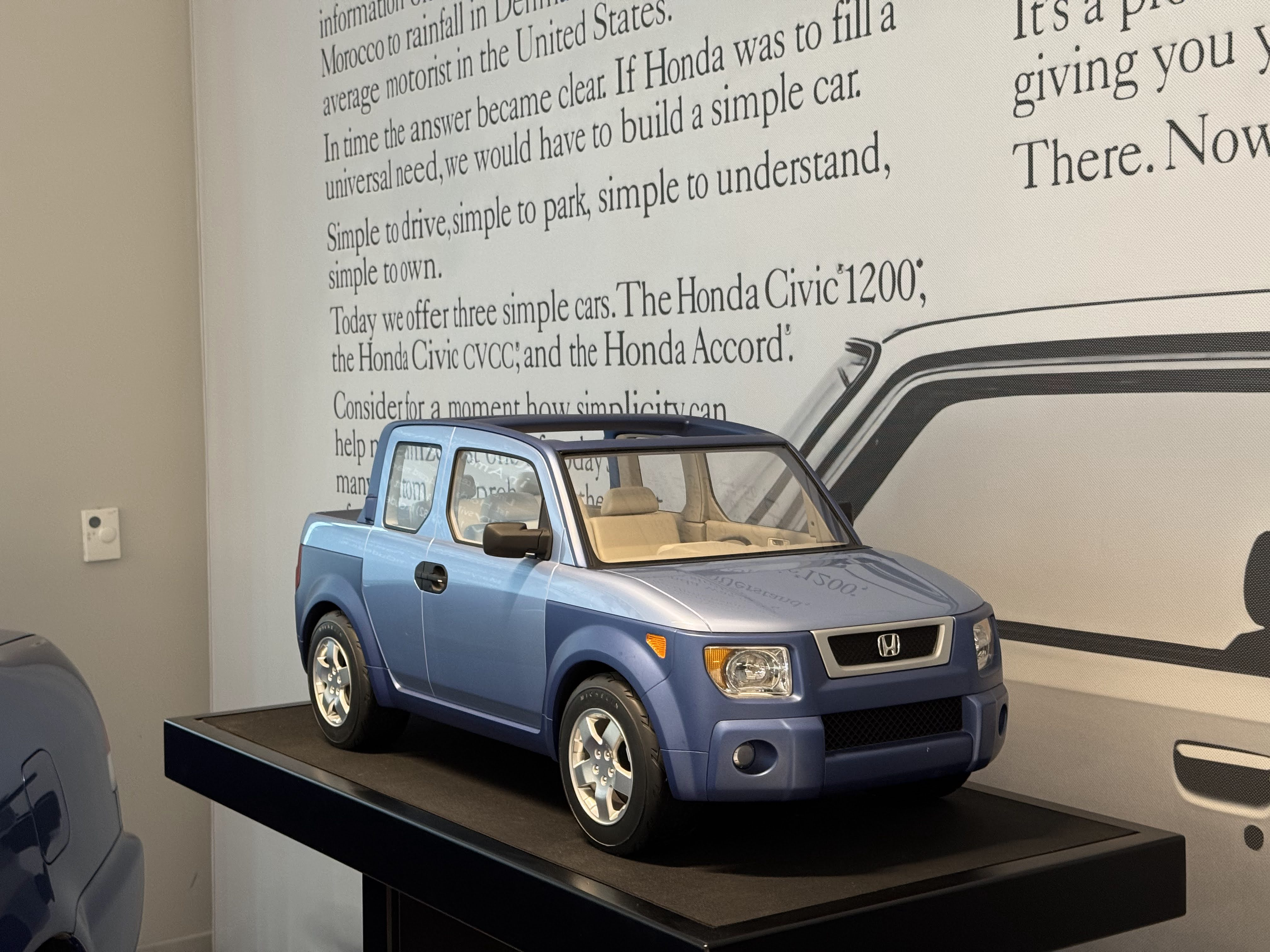
Miniature Honda Model X

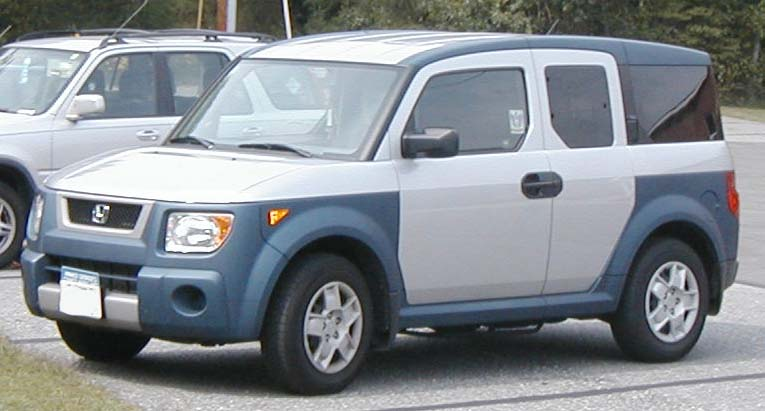
2003- 2005 Honda Element (pre-facelift)

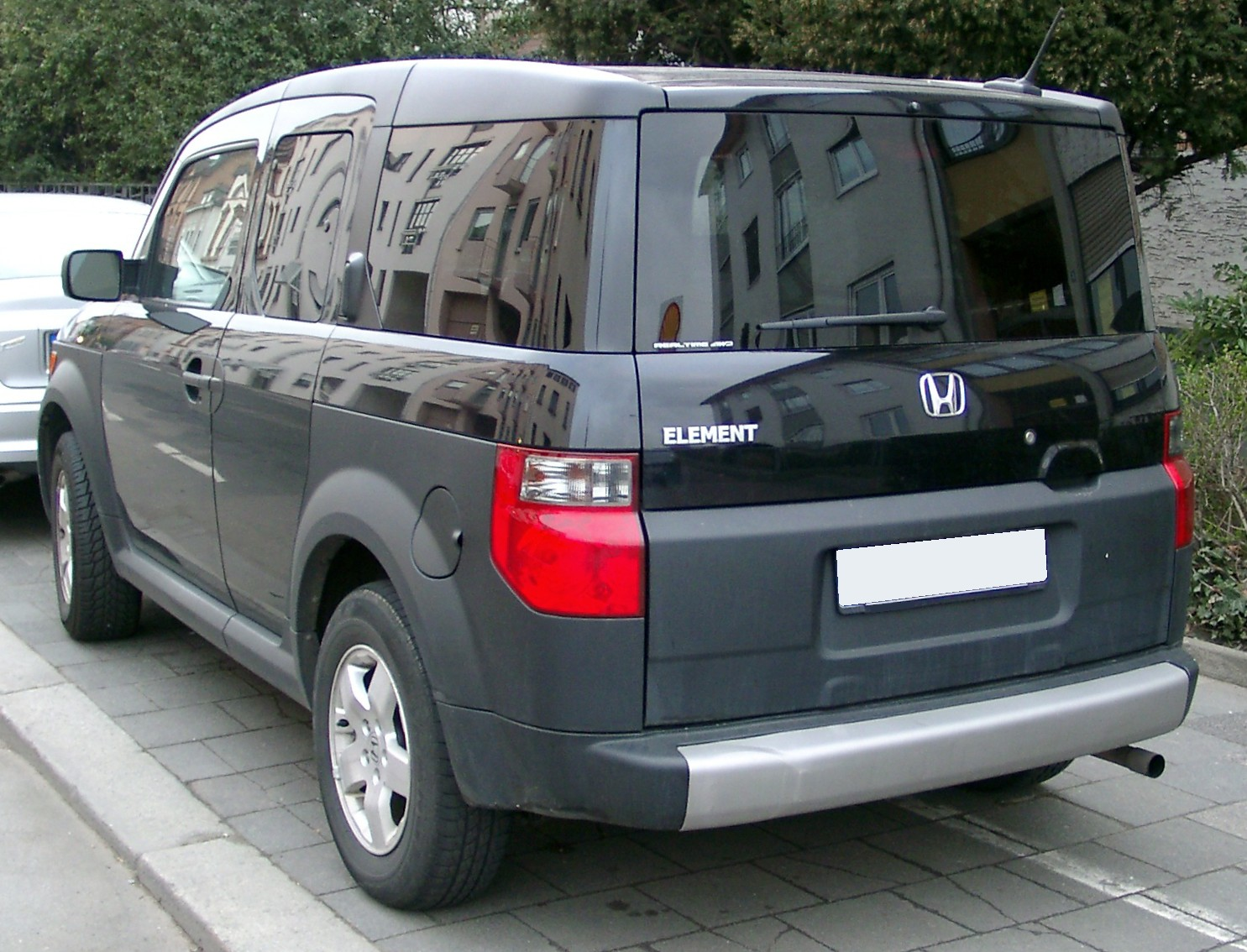
2005 Honda Element (pre-facelift) Europe

The Element followed a concept called Model X which was developed in 1998 and debuted at the 2001 North American International Auto Show in Detroit. The Model X was designed as an activity-oriented vehicle combining features of a pickup truck and a sport utility vehicle, and its styling was inspired by a lifeguard station, its roofline arched to evoke the curve of a surfboard.

Noted for its four bi-parting side doors that open to provide a clear aperature of 1,410 millimeters (55.5 inches), the structure of the Element eliminates the B-pillars by reinforcing and enlarging the side sills, floor and roof cross members, and providing five bulkheads per side. Each rear side door has a reinforced vertical beam; when the door is closed, the beam connects to the body side sill via a hook and catch system, effectively creating a B-pillar. The rear-hinged rear side doors can open only when the forward doors are already open.

The production Element debuted at the 2002 New York International Auto Show with an interior featuring TPO-coated textured urethane flooring; stain-resistant fabric; individually reclining and removable rear seats that stow.

The four-cylinder i-VTEC 2.4 Litre K Engine produced 166 hp (124 kW) at 5800 rpm and 162 lb⋅ft (220 N⋅m) of torque at 4000 rpm for 2007-2011 model years and 160 hp (119 kW) at 5500 rpm and 160 lb⋅ft (217 N⋅m) of torque at 4500 rpm in 2003-2006 model years. Drive is either front-wheel drive or optionally, all wheel drive — via a hydraulically actuated on demand system that engages with front wheel slippage, marketed as "Real Time 4WD". The Element has a towing capacity of 680 kg, or 1500 lbs, and a gross weight of 4450 lbs (2018 kg).

In 2007, the Element won the Dogcars.com "Dog Car of the Year" award because of its "versatile cargo space, easy-clean flooring, crate-friendly rear design and optional 4 wheel drive." and in 2010 it won the "Small SUV" category as a "Top Safety Pick" in the Insurance Institute for Highway Safety Annual Awards.

With projected first year sales of 50,000, the Element sold 67,478 units in 2003 in the US. In 2010, just over 14,000 were sold. According to a 2003 survey, 67% of buyers were over 35, 38% were women, and the median age was 42.

== Model year changes ==
2003 Honda Element EX

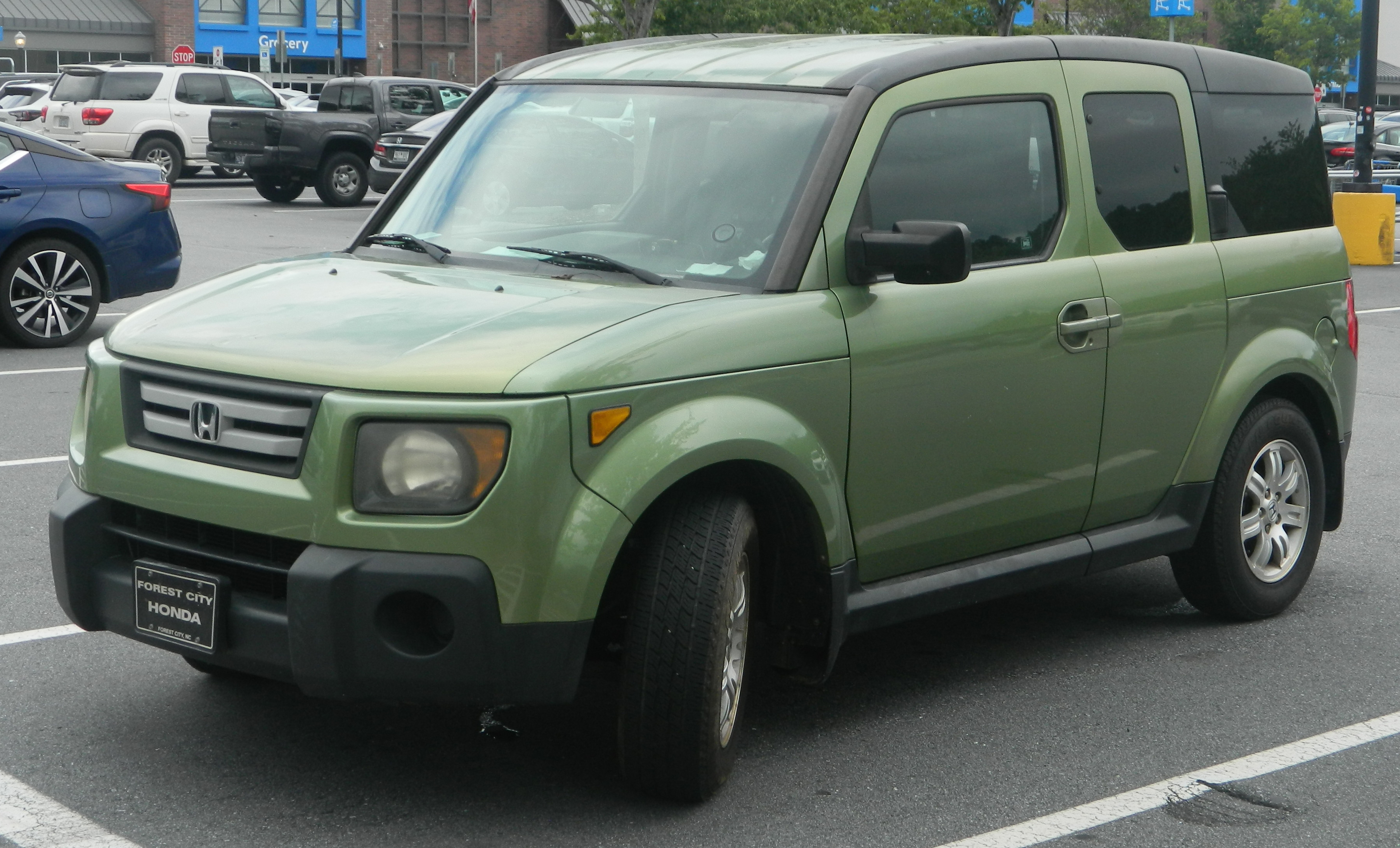
2007–2008 Honda Element EX

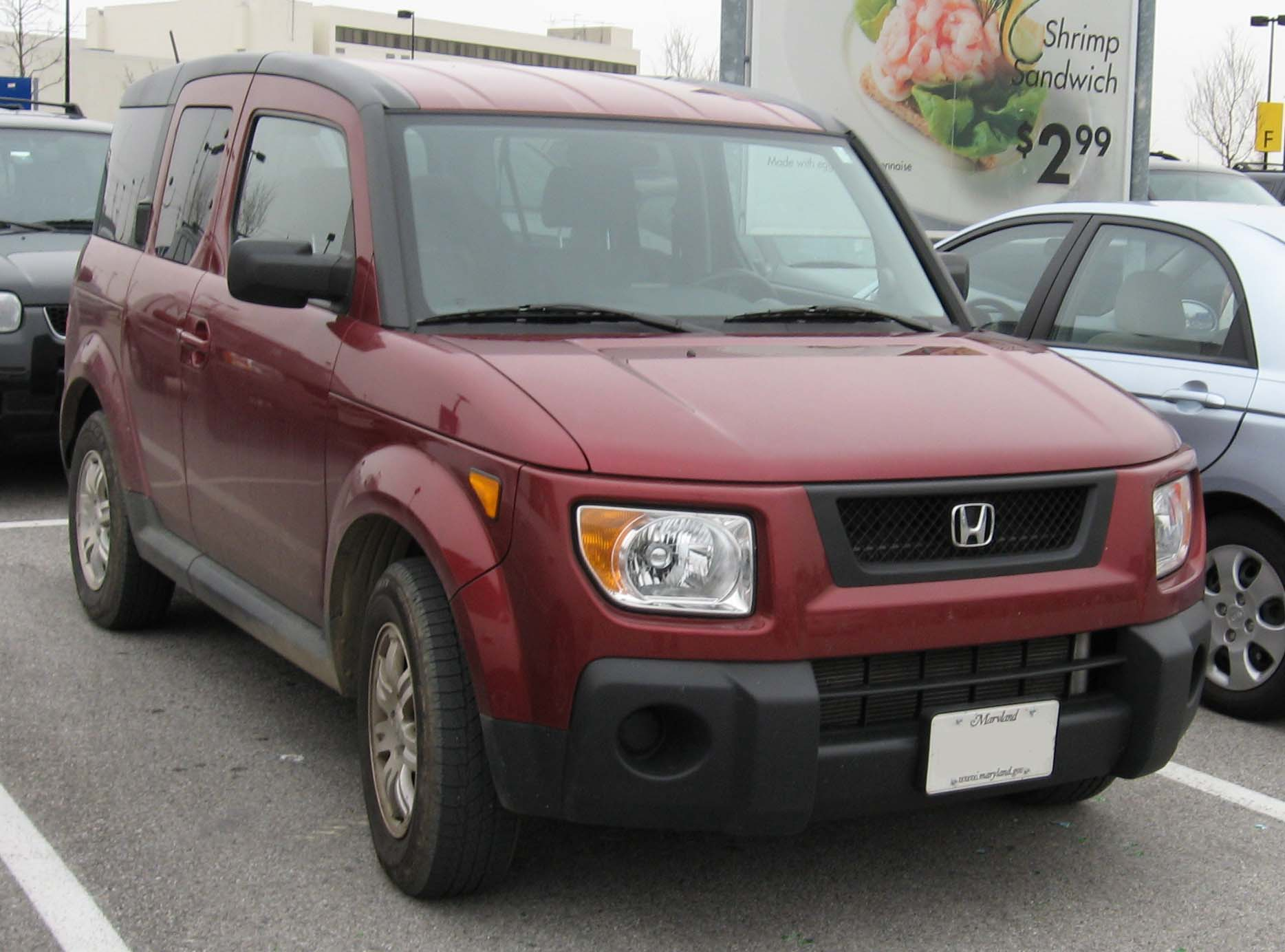
2007–2008 Honda Element

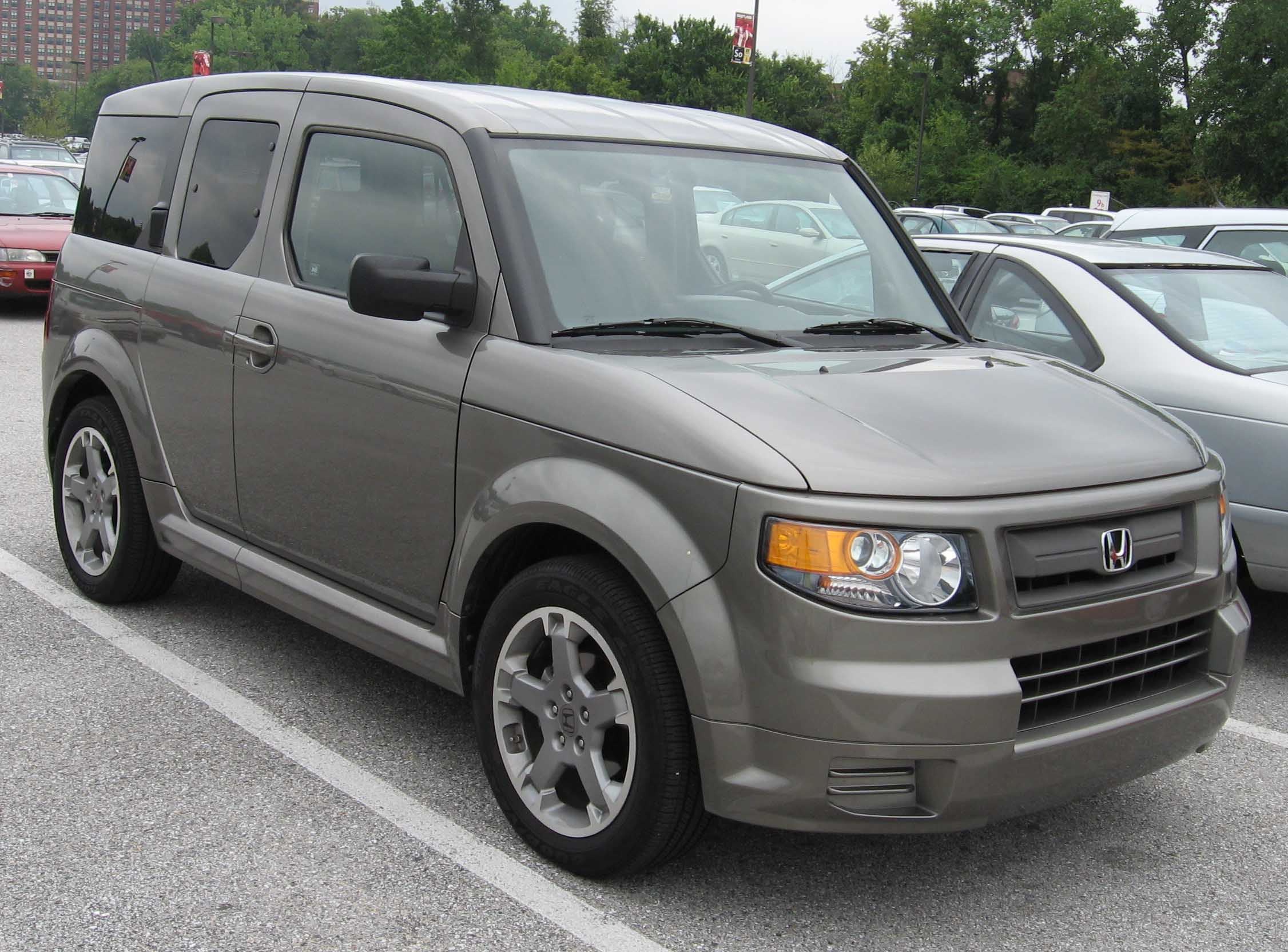
2007–2008 Honda Element SC

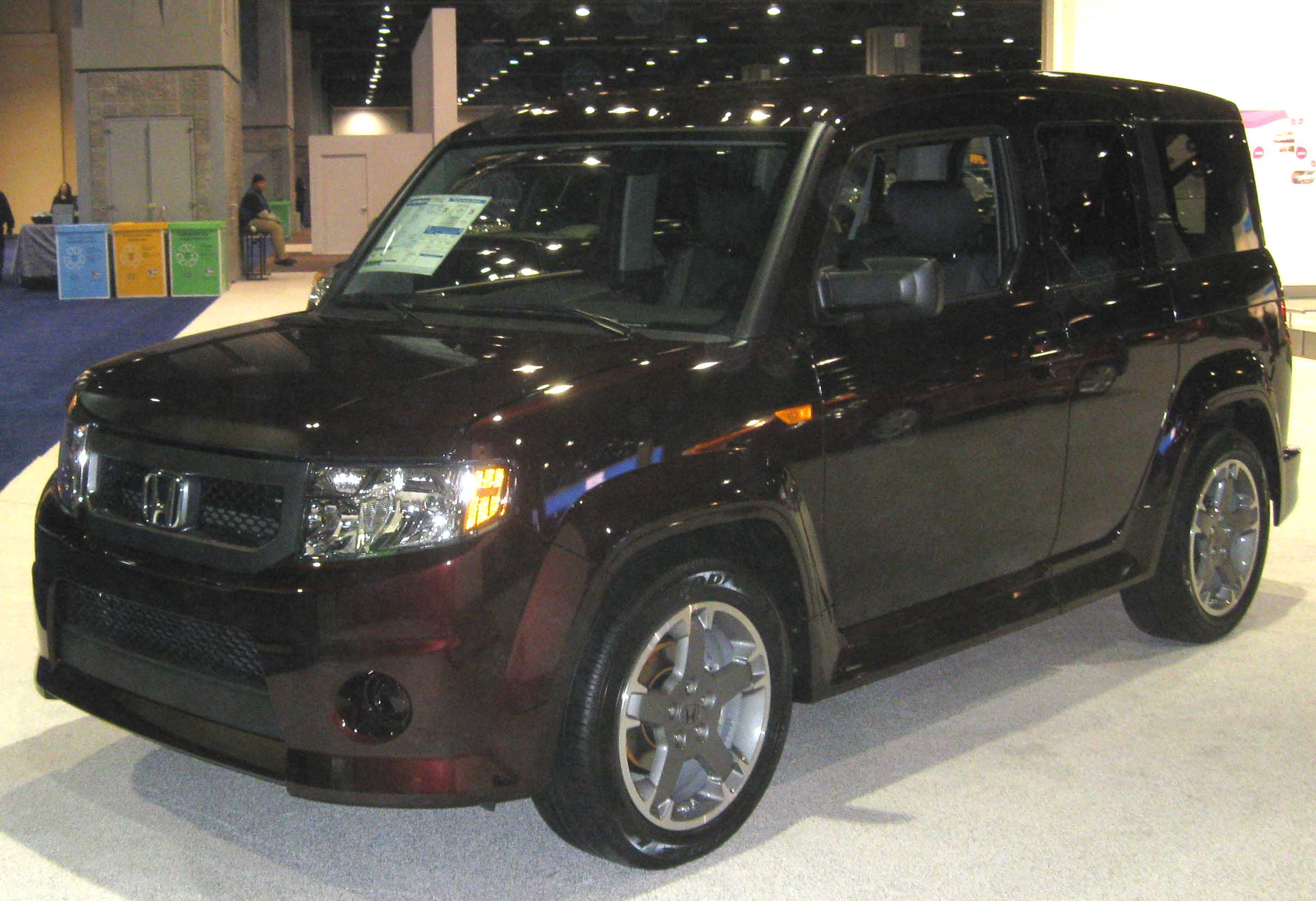
2009–2010 Honda Element SC

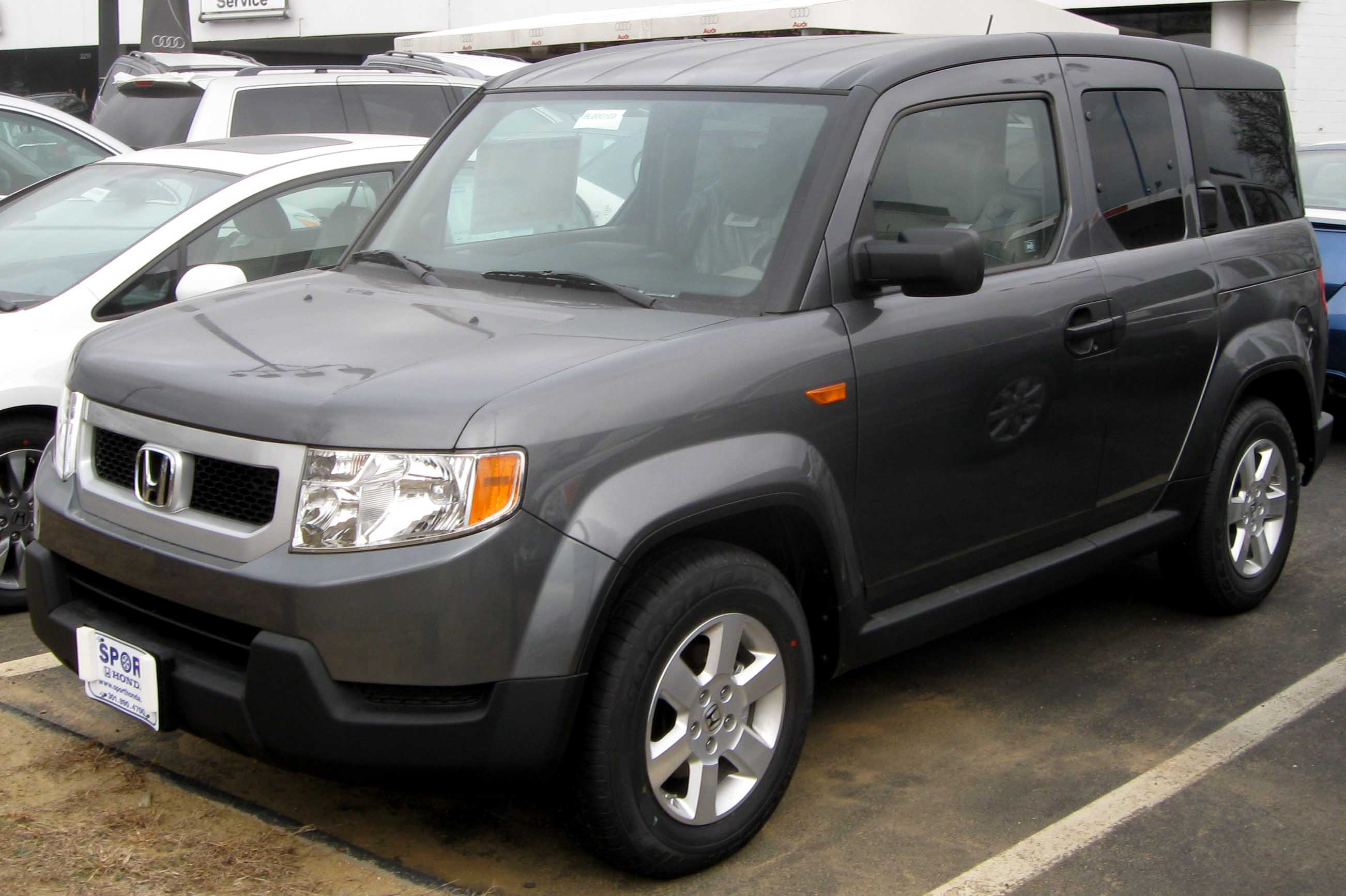
2009–2011 Honda Element

2003: The 2003 Element was launched with two trim levels — DX and EX. All-wheel drive models came with a large rear moonroof. All trim levels came with a 160 hp 2.4L K24A4 4-cylinder engine shared with the 7th generation North American Honda Accord. Production and sales began in December 2002. Side airbags became an option later in the model year on the EX models.

2004: A mid-range LX trim level between the DX and the premium EX trim levels. Keyless entry was made standard on EX models.

2005: The LX model featured revised front seats with a passenger seat armrest. The DX model was eliminated. XM satellite radio and MP3 capabilities were added as standard features in the audio system for the EX model. A 5-speed manual transmission was standard. The charcoal gray plastic tone was darkened and a navy blue was offered with the Satin Silver Metallic paint. Hub Caps on the LX were changed to cover the entire wheel. Fuel economy was officially 19 miles per US gallon (12.4 L/100 km; 22.8 mpg_{‑imp}) City, 23 miles per US gallon (10.2 L/100 km; 27.6 mpg_{‑imp}) Highway, and 20 miles per US gallon (11.8 L/100 km; 24.0 mpg_{‑imp}) Combined.

2006: A fully painted version called the EX-P became available for an extra US$500. It came with a 5-speed manual transmission or an optional 4-speed automatic transmission.

2007: The 2007 Element received a mild refresh, which included 6 hp increase to 166 hp, along with a 5-speed automatic transmission replacing the 4-speed automatic transmission. The front seat belts shoulder mounting location was relocated to the front seat backs rather than the rear doors — allowing rear-seat occupants to exit the vehicle without a front occupant having to unbuckle. Side airbags became standard, as did electronic stability control. The plastic latticework grille was replaced by silver-colored slats. A new trim level called the SC was offered with a different front bumper and grille, lowered suspension and 18-inch alloy wheels, projector headlamps, "tribal print" seat fabric, center console, and carpeted floors in the seating areas. Unlike the other trim packages, the SC had a non-removable center console and was unavailable with all-wheel drive.

2008: The only changes from the 2007 Element were the addition of the color Royal Blue Pearl for the SC trim and the mounting location of the rear-view mirror (from the windshield to the roof).

2009: New color combinations for the dashboard became available. For 2009, the Honda Element received an optional navigation system, outside temperature display and minor exterior revisions. The hood and grille were redesigned, the front fenders became made from all metal rather than painted composite material, and the wheel arches were squared off. The rear moonroof was no longer available for 2009-2011. 2009 was the last year of availability for the 5-speed manual transmission. It was available on AWD EX and FWD SC trims.

2010: For 2010, Honda Element offered LX, EX, EX with Navigation, and SC trim levels. Only the EX-4WD trim was available with a 5-speed manual transmission. 2010 is also the last year for Canadian models.

2011: For 2011, the option of a navigation system and the sporty SC trim level were dropped. The Royal Blue Pearl color was also eliminated. Honda discontinued the Element after this year and it was not replaced.

== Advertising and marketing ==
=== Gil the Crab ===
Honda employed an "Element and Friends" ad campaign, using one of its characters, the crab, given the name Gil. Including ads with his "I Pinch!" catch phrase, Gil had a myspace page to chronicle Gil's trouble with the law. In order to tap into social networking sites, which began to play larger roles in ad campaigns in the mid-2000s, Gil was to maintain a blog, promote an online petition to save his job, and endorse Gil paraphernalia through a website. This led up to the launch of the new commercial dubbed Element TV, which premiered 28 September 2006, and rolled out with the new Honda Element SC which went on sale that same day.

=== Element and Friends - version 2.0 ===
In the late 2006, the defunct Element and Friends website, was re-launched with the introduction of the new Element SC trim. The previous version had the driving game using the Element EX-P (was simply called the EX) in a desert, snow topped mountains, forests, and a beach. They renamed that area "above ground". A new second option from the main page allows you to select the Element SC to go "underground" in an urbanesque environment featuring a drive-in, central park with a basketball court, a seedy mainstreet, and project housing. The six new SC friends include a rat, mole, hamster, pigeon, roach, and a dog. The drive-in serves as the venue to view the TV spots that feature only the rat, mole, pigeon, and hamster. The format remains the same with new mini-games, but both maps included a tunnel to venture above or below the surface, through the mountain and building respectively. Changes to the above ground include the removal of the previous TV spots from the website and a link on the beach to Gil's Myspace page.

RPA, the company which created the Element and friends website, won the "Best in Show" from MIXX Awards for the microsite. They revealed that visitors average 15 minutes on the site. The TV campaign was created by Adam Lowrey and Chuck Blackwell, and the digital and social campaign was created by Luis Ramirez and J. Barbush. The microsite was built in Flash and created by David Howard and Chris Pierantozzi.

=== Dog-friendly Concept ===
After the Element won the Dogcars.com's "Dog Car of the Year" award in 2007, Honda presented a dog-friendly package at the 2009 New York Auto Show — with a pet restraint system, extendable cargo area load-in ramp, 12V DC rear ventilation fan, second-row seat covers with a simple beige dog-outline pattern design to match the bed cover fabric, all-season rubber floor mats with a toy bone pattern, a fan, and "Dog Friendly" exterior pawprint emblems. A spill-resistant water bowl, also included, could be placed into a nook in the corner of the pet bed.

The second row pet restraint system was a small net crate suitable for cats or small dogs, which could be belted into place. It strapped directly to the lower portion of the seat and the captive animal could not see out the windows, unlike the pet "booster seats" sold by pet-supply vendors specifically designed to allow small dogs to see through the windows and sniff the incoming airflow. The pet bed is a thick cushion for the whole of the rear cargo area. The cargo area pet restraint system consists of netting on the sides and the top of the dog bed, as well as a zip-up fourth side to be secured after the dog is loaded.

The package was dealer-installed and retailed for $1,000.
