= United States domestic market =

United States domestic market (USDM) is an unofficial term used chiefly by automotive enthusiasts to describe the United States' economic market for American brand automobiles and parts. Similar automotive enthusiast terms Japanese domestic market (JDM) and European domestic market (EDM) are used to designate Japanese and European market automobiles and parts respectively.

The term is also applied to vehicles that comply with United States regulations, most notably the lights and bumpers, which different from European standards. The incompatibility requires manufacturers to develop USDM and EDM versions of their models if they want to sell them in both regions.

Sometimes the conversion in the factory lane is done after the model was launched in the European market. The conversion to United States federal laws is often called "federalization".

The United States–Mexico–Canada Agreement, which went into effect in 2020, increased the percentage of auto parts that manufacturers must source from North America and from the United States.

The term is sometimes used in the context of commodities.

== See also ==
- Tariffs in the second Trump administration
