= Honda Spirior =

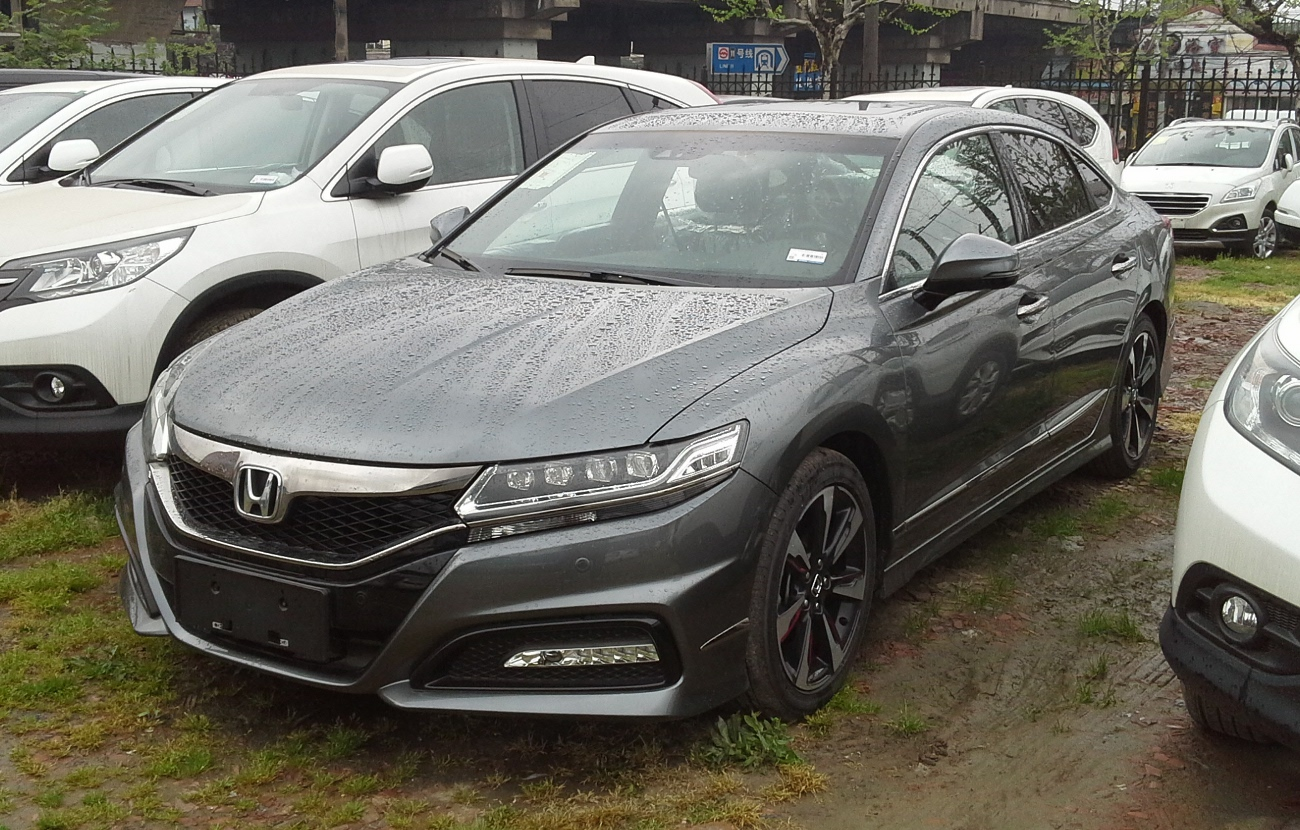
- Honda Spirior II Si

Overview
- Manufacturer: Honda
- Also called: Acura TSX (North America); Honda Accord (Japan and Europe); Honda Accord Euro (Australia and New Zealand)
- Production: 2009–2018
- Model years: 2009–2018

Body and chassis
- Class: Mid-size car (D)
- Layout: FF layout

Chronology
- Predecessor: Honda Accord (Japan and Europe seventh generation)
- Successor: Honda Inspire (sixth generation, China)

The Honda Spirior (Chinese: 思铂睿; pinyin: Sībóruì) is a mid-size sedan produced by Honda. It was introduced from 2009.

== First generation (2009) ==
The first generation Spirior was a badge-engineered version of the Japanese and European eighth generation Accord/Acura TSX. Production started in August 2009 in China, by Dongfeng Honda. At the same time, the North American and Asia Pacific version of the eighth generation Accord was marketed as the Honda Accord in China and produced by Honda’s joint venture with Chinese automaker GAC.

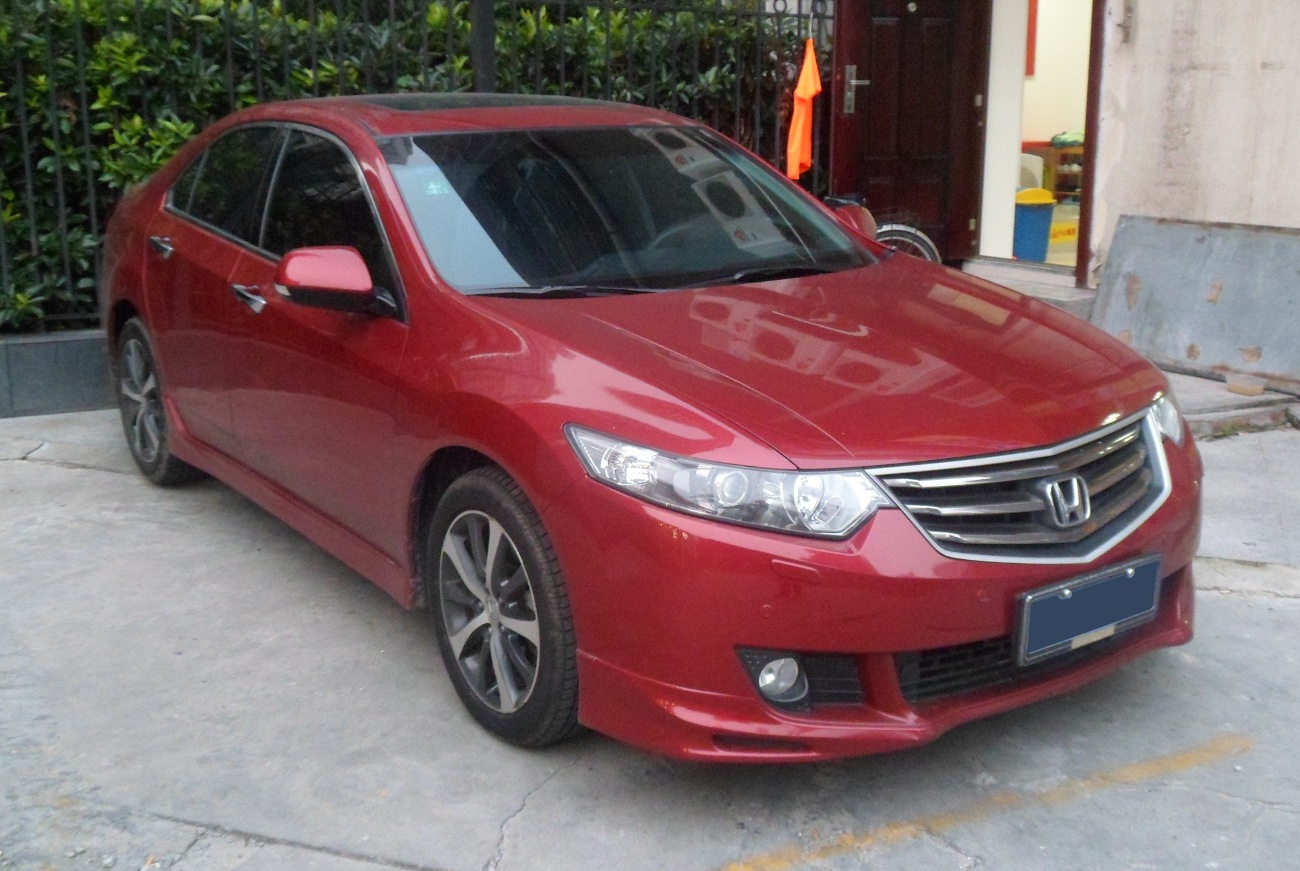
First generation Honda Spirior

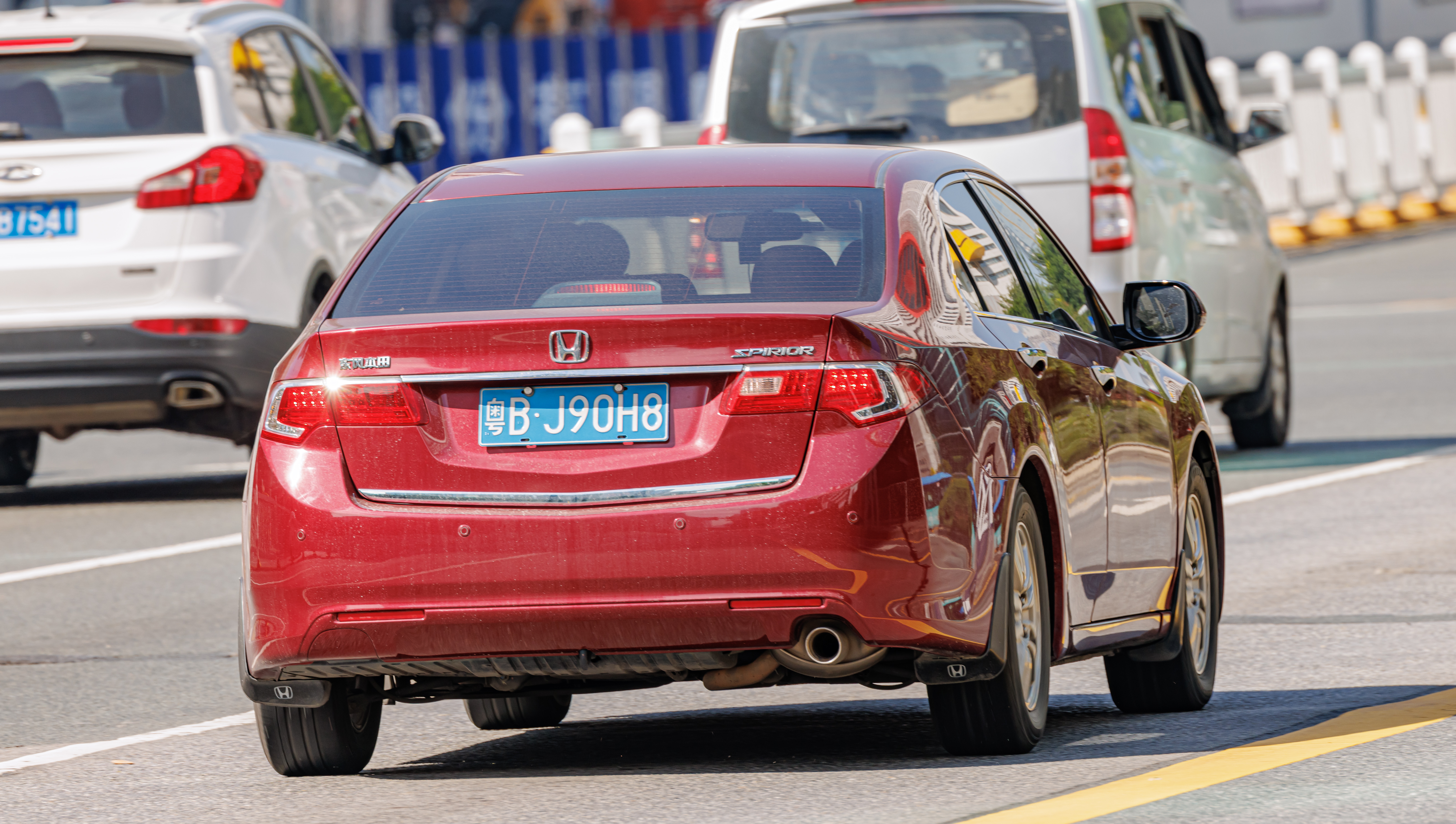
First generation Honda Spirior (rear view, China)

== Second generation (2015) ==
Honda Spirior
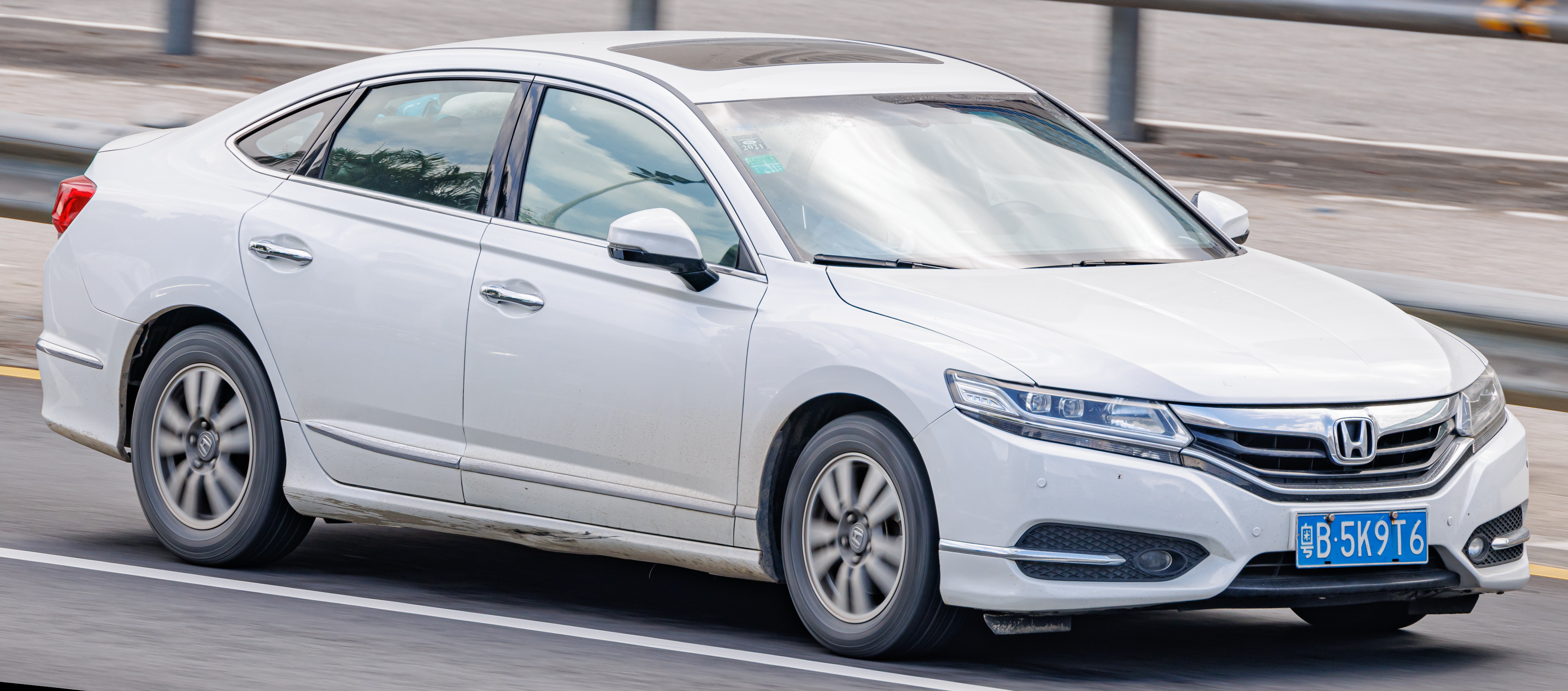
- Honda Spirior (second generation, China)

Overview
- Manufacturer: Honda
- Also called: Honda Accord (Japan and Europe, 2009–2015); Acura TSX (North America, 2009–2014)
- Production: 2015–2018
- Assembly: China: Wuhan (Dongfeng Honda)

Body and chassis
- Class: Mid-size car
- Body style: 4-door sedan
- Layout: Front-engine, front-wheel-drive
- Related: Acura TSX

Powertrain
- Engine: Petrol: 2.0 L R20Z8 SOHC i-VTEC I4; 2.4 L K24Z5 DOHC i-VTEC I4; Hybrid: 2.0 L LFA1 DOHC i-VTEC I4
- Electric motor: 2x AC Synchronous Permanent-Magnet Electric Motor (Spirior Hybrid)
- Transmission: 5/6-speed manual; 5-speed automatic; 8-speed dual clutch; CVT
- Hybrid drivetrain: Series hybrid with paralleling clutch (Spirior Hybrid)

Dimensions
- Wheelbase: 2,780 mm (109.4 in)
- Length: 4,840 mm (190.6 in)
- Width: 1,850 mm (72.8 in)
- Height: 1,465 mm (57.7 in)
- Curb weight: 1,520 kg (3,351 lb)

The Spirior concept was revealed at the 2014 Beijing Auto Show previewing the production model exclusive to China by the end of 2014. It is produced by Honda’s joint venture with Dongfeng and sold exclusively in the Chinese market. Besides the base 2.0 L R20Z8 i‑VTEC engine mated to a CVT, the Spirior stood out as Honda’s first mainstream sedan to combine a powerful 2.4 L K24Z5 Earth Dreams engine with an in-house 8-speed DCT in China, offering sharper throttle response and smoother acceleration than a traditional automatic. In 2017, a sport hybrid variant was introduced, sharing Honda's Intelligent Multi-Mode Drive (i-MMD) system with the ninth-generation Accord Hybrid. This system paired a 2.0 L Atkinson-cycle engine with dual electric motors and an E-CVT, delivering high fuel efficiency and smooth electric-assisted driving tailored to urban conditions. The Spirior includes advanced features like all-LED lighting, a head-up display, lane-departure warning, and blind-spot monitoring, helping it blur the line between mainstream and luxury performance sedans. It was replaced in late 2018 by the sixth generation Inspire, which is a rebadged tenth generation Accord.

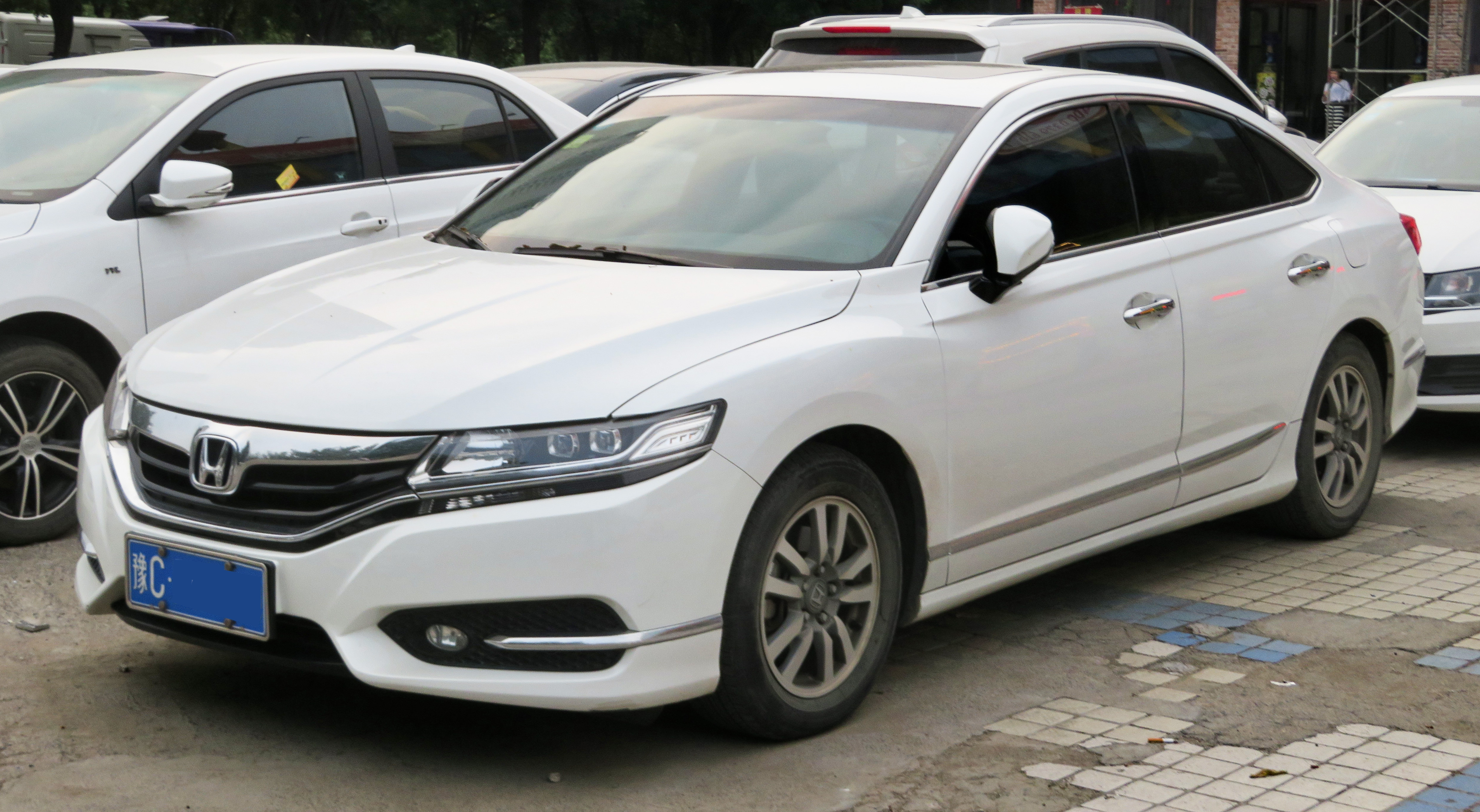
Honda Spirior (front view, China)

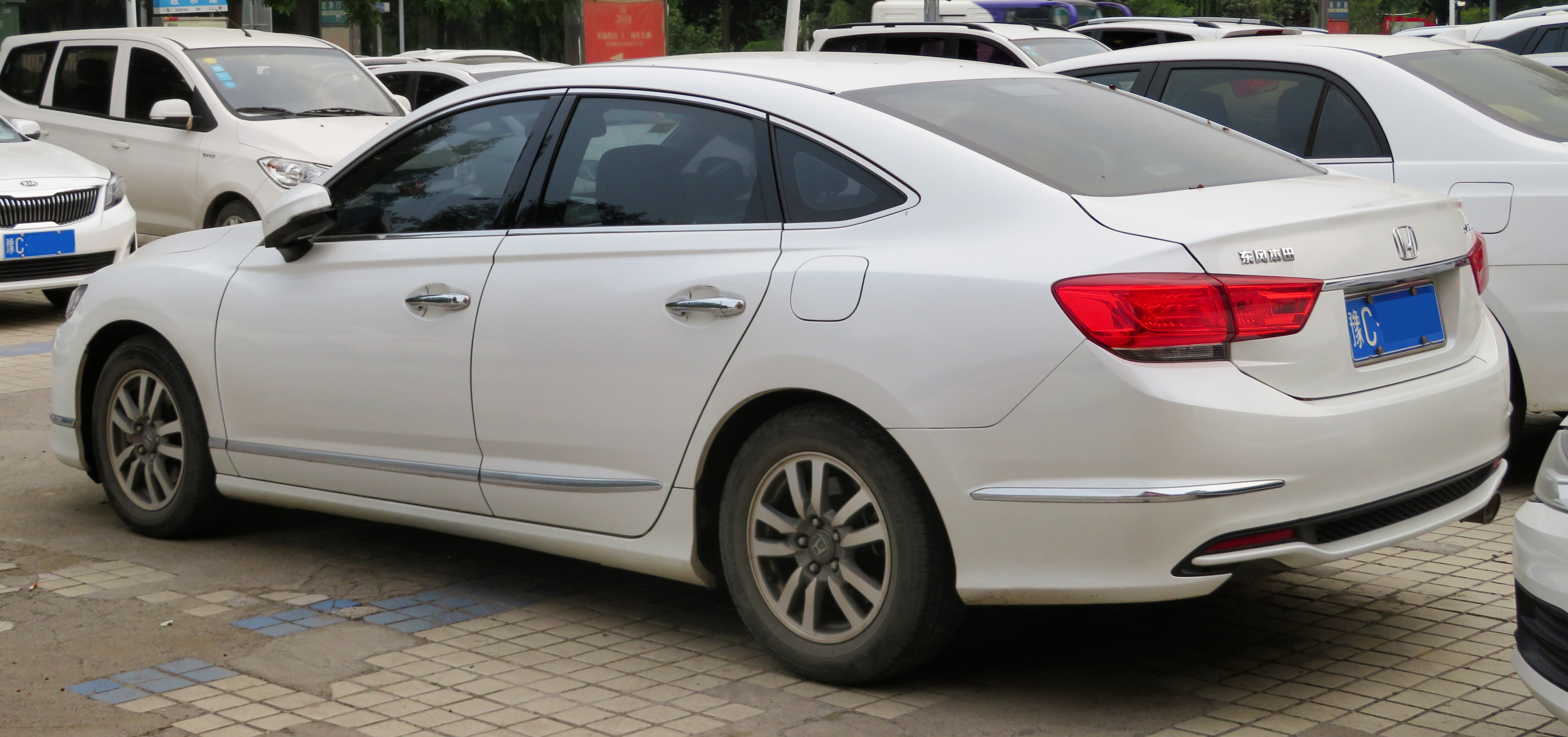
Honda Spirior (rear view, China)

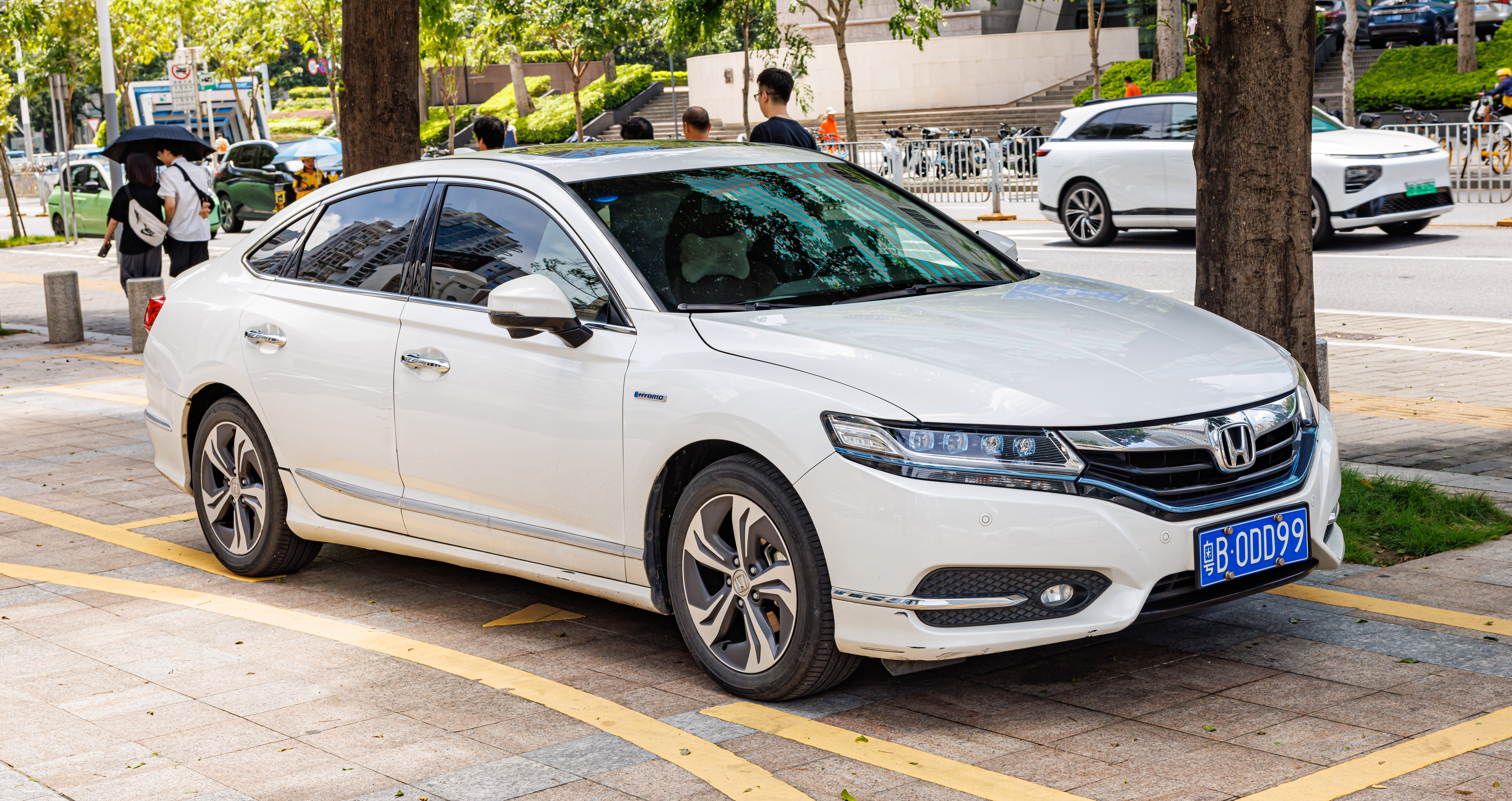
Honda Spirior Sport Hybrid (front view, China)

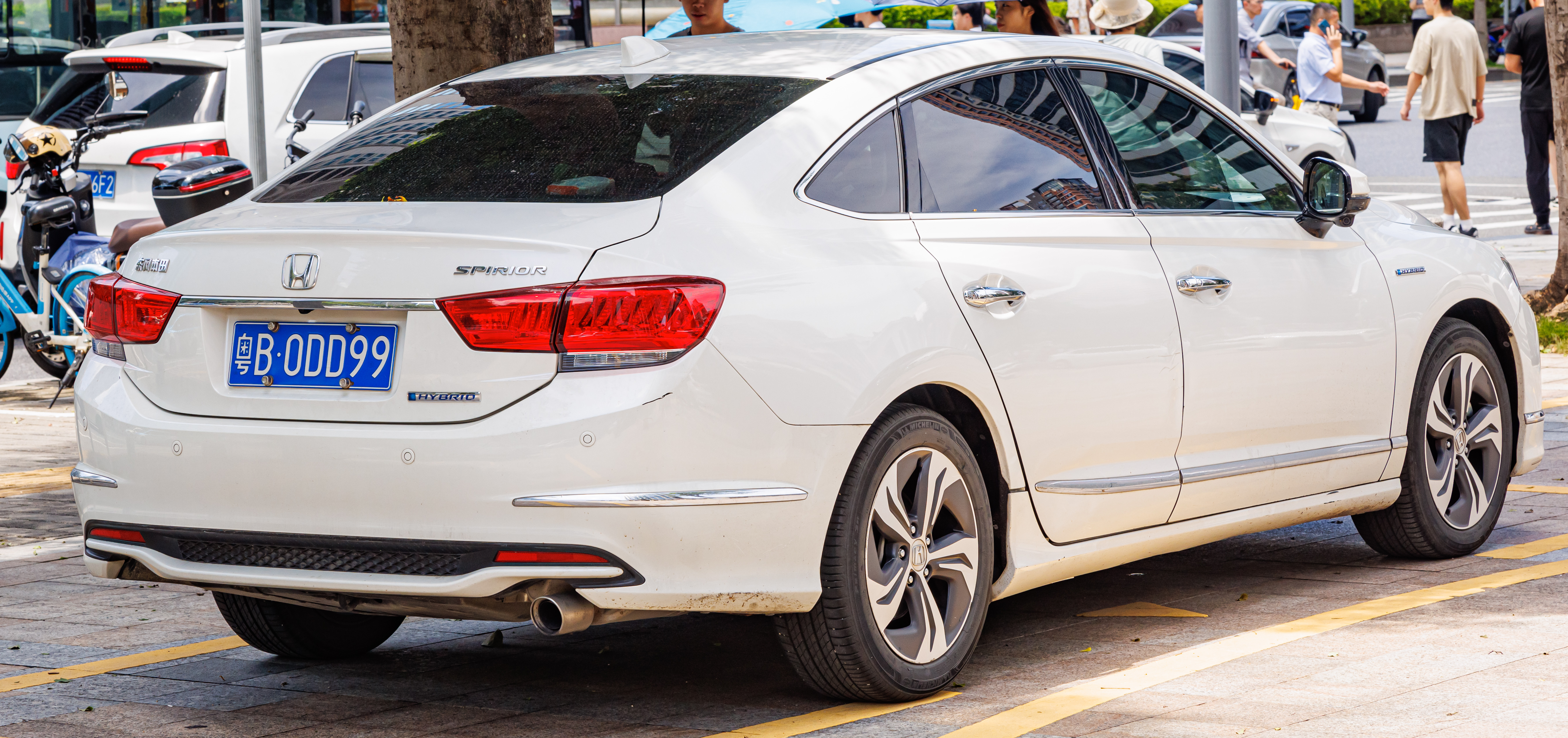
Honda Spirior Sport Hybrid (rear view, China)

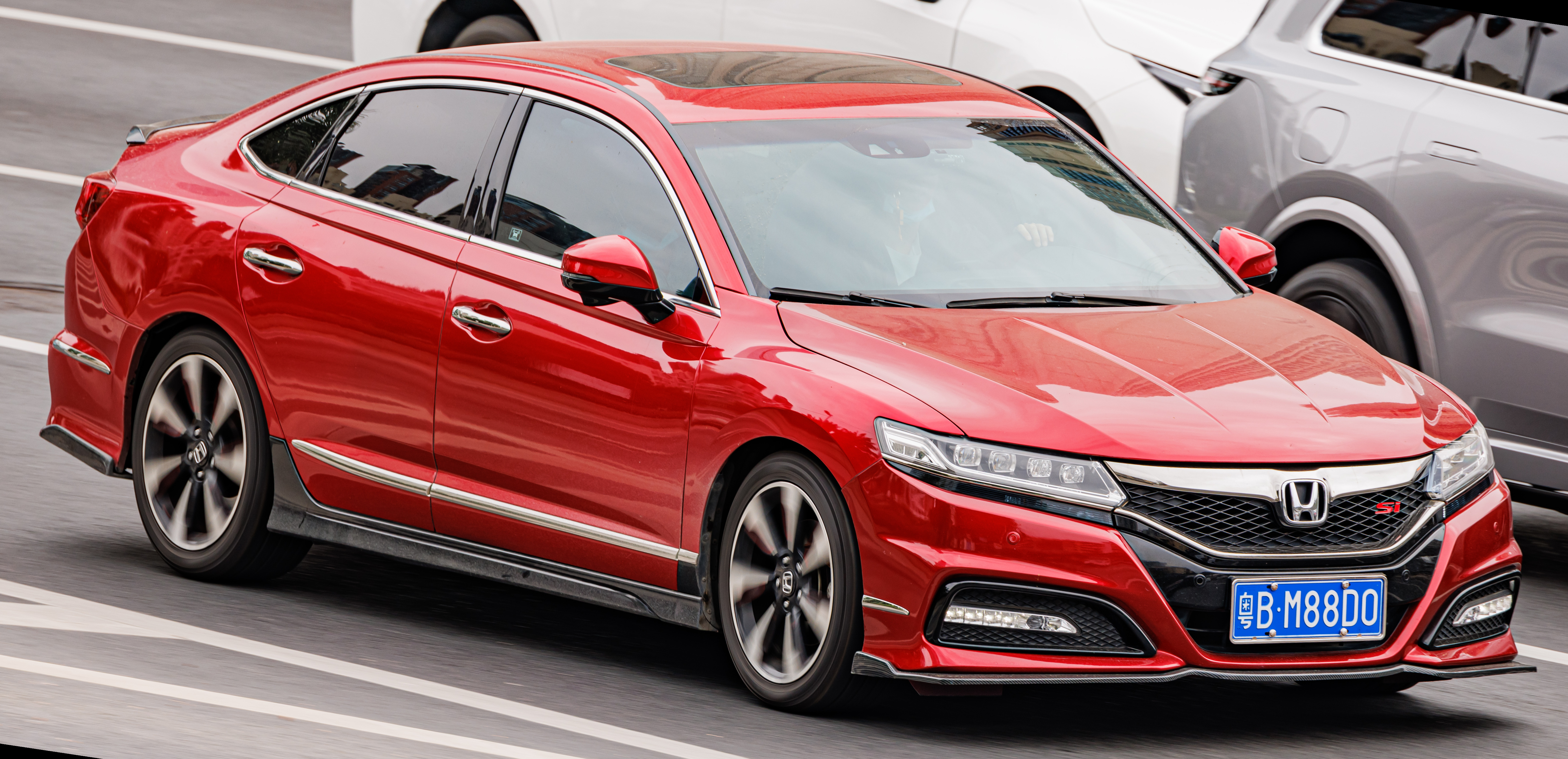
Honda Spirior Si (China)
