= Honda FR-V =

Honda FR-V (BE1/2/3/4/8)
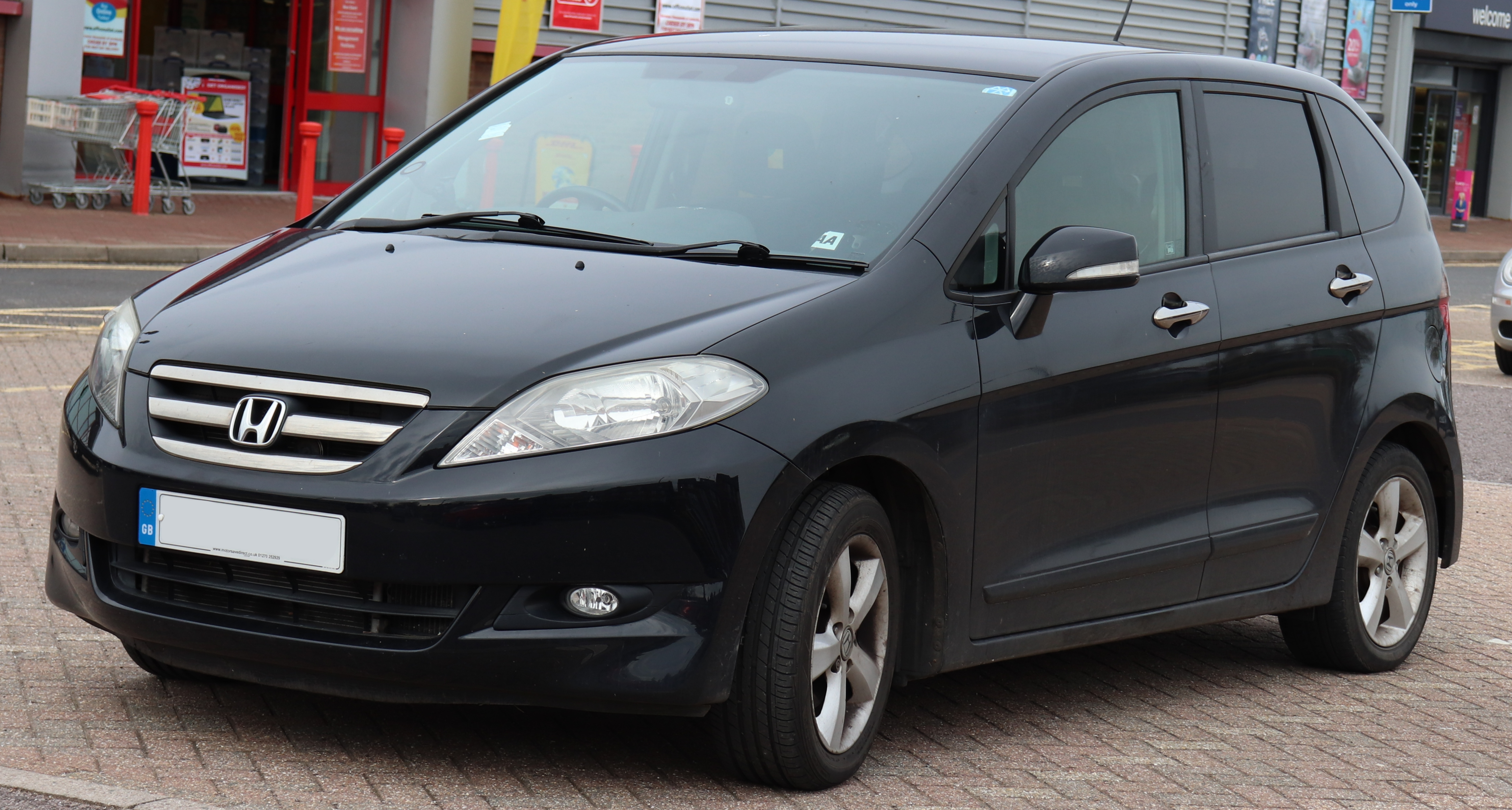

Overview
- Manufacturer: Honda
- Also called: Honda Edix (Japan)
- Production: 2004–2009
- Assembly: Suzuka, Japan

Body and chassis
- Class: Compact MPV
- Body style: 5-door MPV
- Layout: Front-engine, front-wheel-drive Front-engine, all-wheel-drive
- Related: Honda CR-V; Honda Civic

Powertrain
- Engine: Petrol: 1.7 L D17A2 I4; 1.8 L R18A1 I4; 2.0 L K20A I4; 2.4 L K24A I4; Diesel: 2.2 L N22A I4
- Transmission: 5-speed manual 6-speed manual 5-speed automatic 4-speed automatic

Dimensions
- Wheelbase: 2,685 mm (105.7 in)
- Length: 4,285 mm (168.7 in)
- Width: 1,795 mm (70.7 in)
- Height: 1,610 mm (63.4 in); 1,625 mm (64.0 in) (with roof rails)
- Curb weight: 1,370–1,490 kg (3,020–3,285 lb)

Chronology
- Predecessor: Honda S-MX (Japan)
- Successor: Honda Freed (Japan)

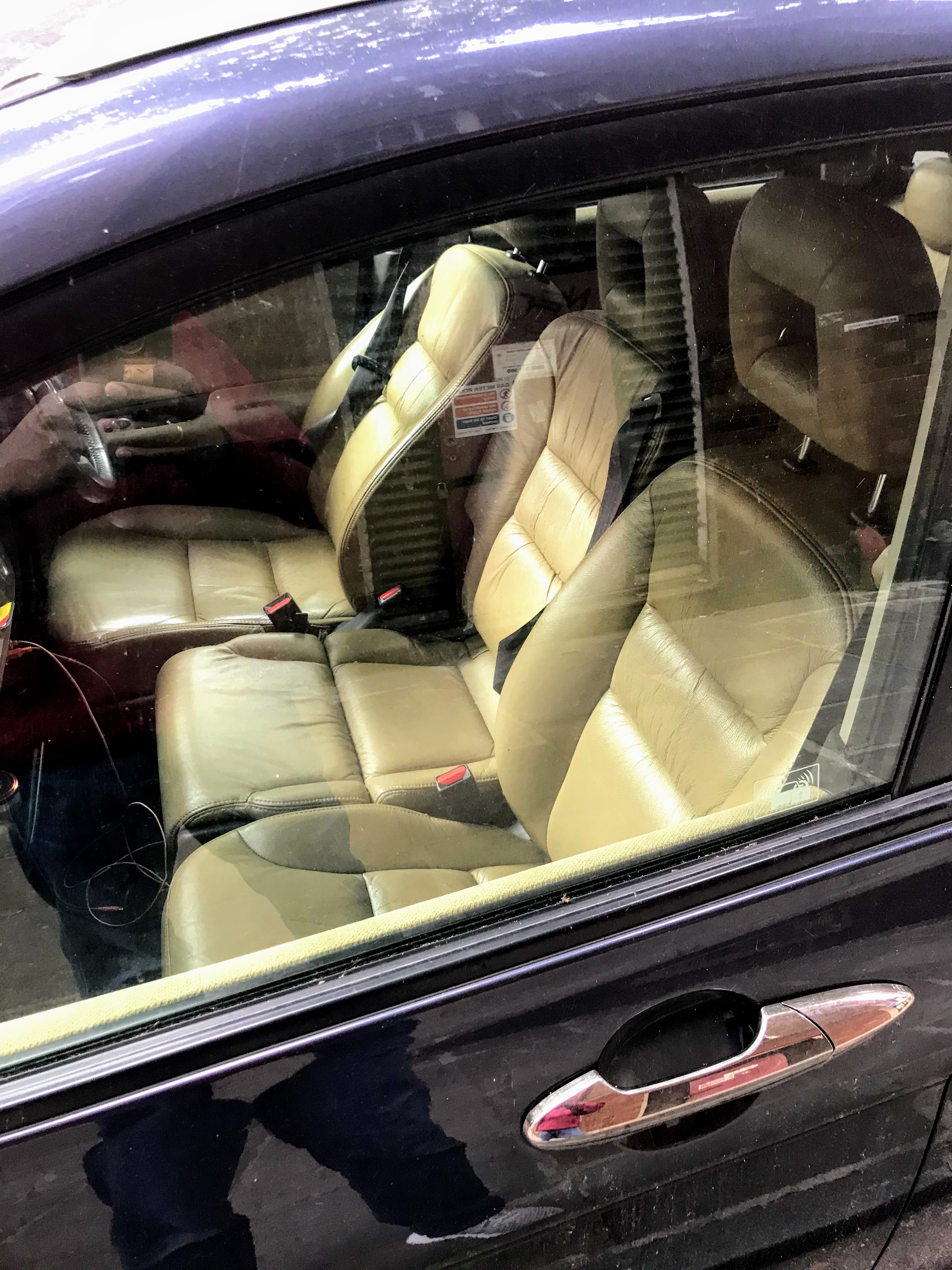
Honda FR-V 3+3 seating- Front seats

The Honda FR-V, marketed as the Honda Edix in Japan, is a six-passenger car that was manufactured by Honda from 2004 to 2009 (with marketing ending in 2011 in some regions), over a single generation. A five-door compact multi-purpose vehicle (MPV), the FR-V was noted for its 3+3 seating configuration, along with the Fiat Multipla.

It has been claimed that FR-V stands for Flexible Recreation Vehicle, although Honda did not officially state this.

The FR-V was officially launched in Europe in Autumn 2004. It shares a similar platform to the Honda CR-V (which in turn shares a similar platform to the Honda Civic), but with a longer wheelbase. The FR-V allows folding down the front middle seat to create a tray or arm rest. The compact MPV offers 32 different seating combinations in addition to three ISOFIX points.

The front suspension is a MacPherson strut, with the rear being double wishbone suspension.

In 2007, the FR-V received its first and only facelift, where Honda changed the front bumper, headlights, tail lights and door handles. On the inside, the wood-trim was removed, leaving only the carbon-fibre look trim. An aux-in port was added for the infotainment system. At a similar time, the 2.2 i-CTDi Diesel engine was added.

In August 2009, the FR-V ended production without a direct successor.

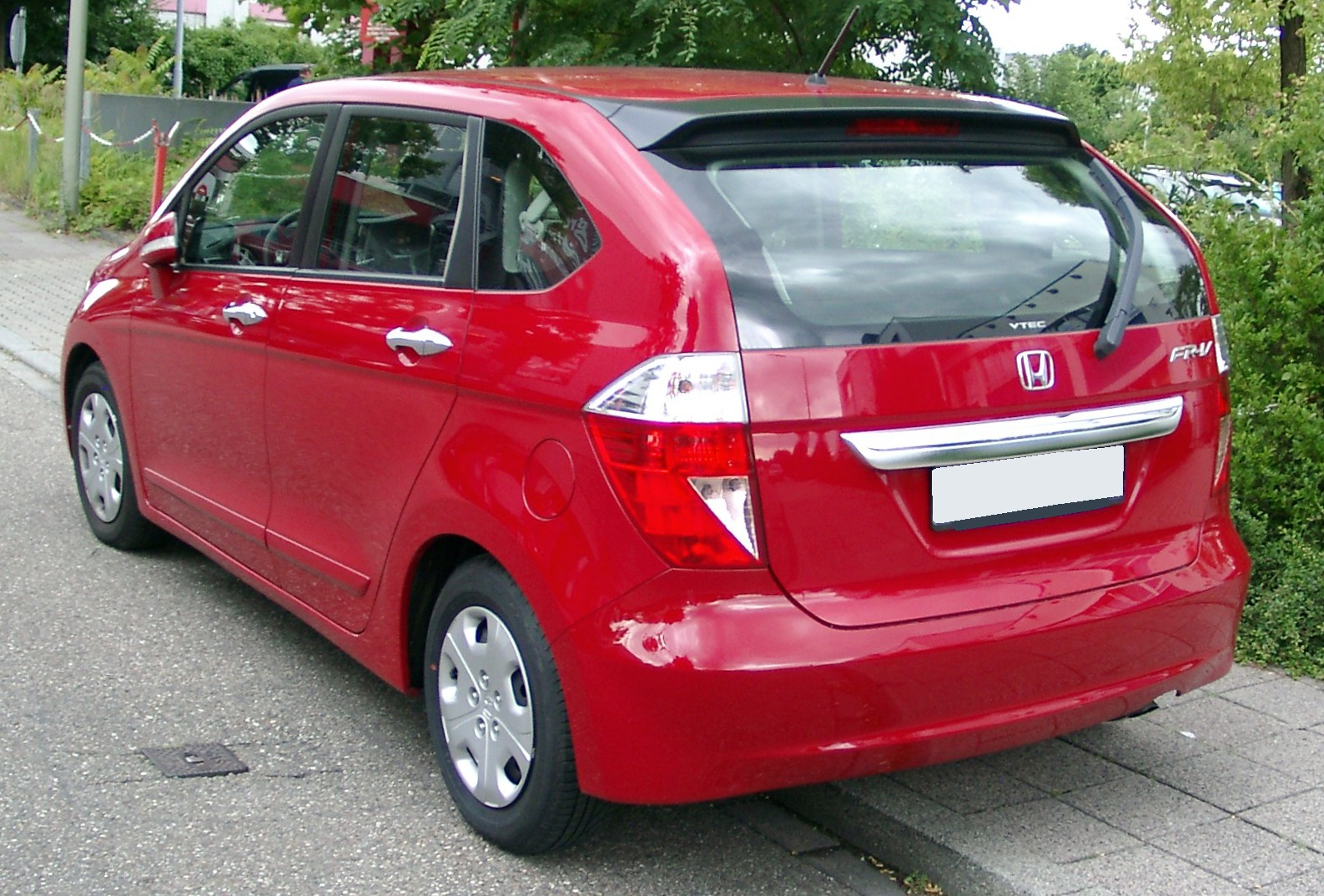
Rear view

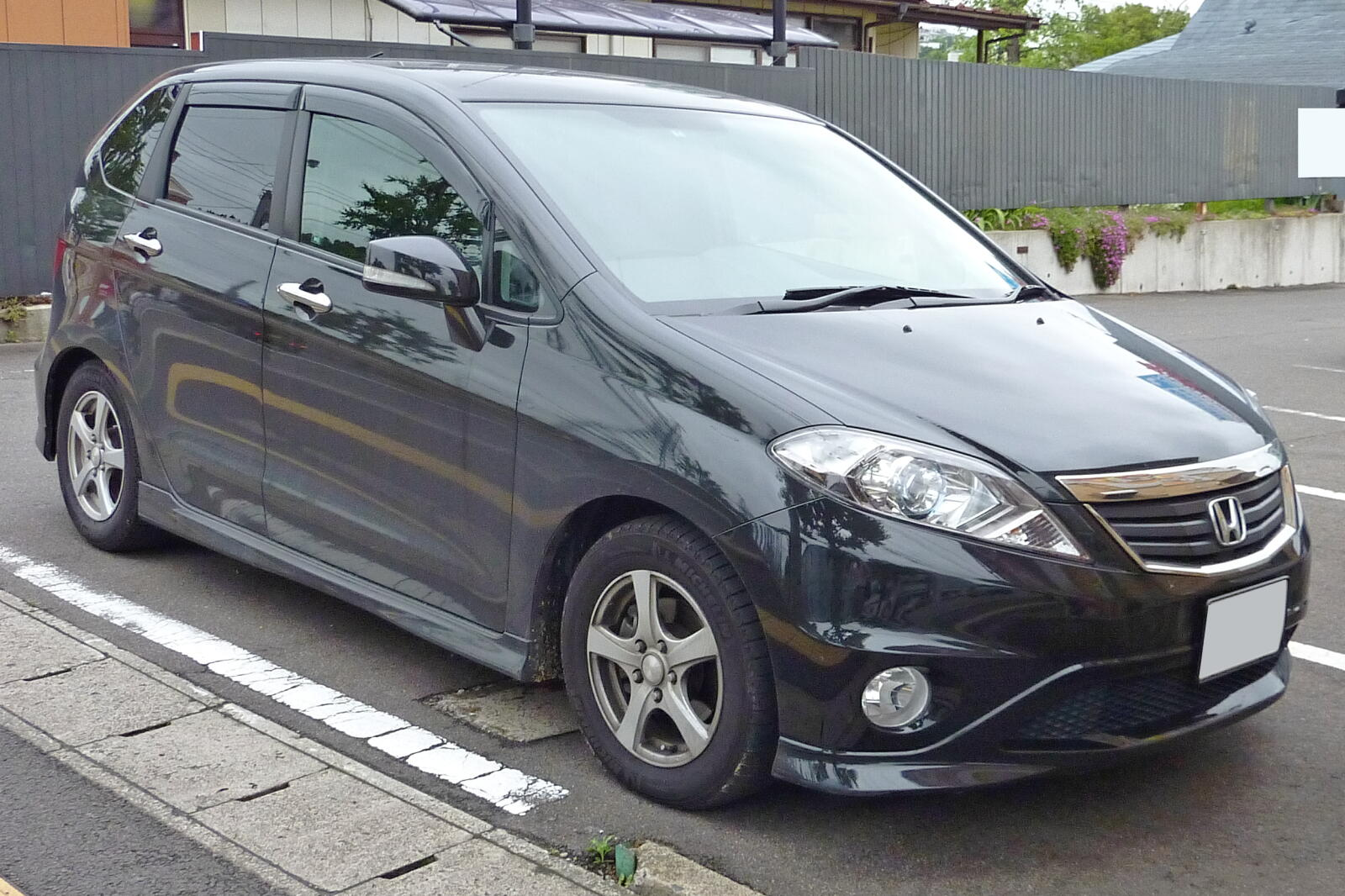
Honda Edix (Japan; facelift)

== Engines ==
The FR-V was available with four petrol (both Japan and Europe used the K20, with slight differences) and one diesel powered engine, though this depended on the region.

The 1.7 VTEC and 2.0 i-VTEC were replaced in the spring of 2007 by a new 1.8 i-VTEC first introduced in the eighth generation Honda Civic. The Japanese-market version (known as the Honda Edix) kept the 2.0 i-VTEC engine, and a 2.4 i-VTEC engine was added. At the same time, some minor cosmetic changes were made (carbon effect interior, light cluster, and darker front grille). All-wheel drive was also offered for vehicles sold in Japan.

Engines
Engine	Code	Type	Displacement	Power	Torque	Drive type	Gearbox	0-60 mph	Top speed	Combined consumption	CO_{2} emissions	Production years	Region
Petrol Engines
1.7 VTEC	D17A2	I4	1688 cc	125 PS (92 kW) at 6300 rpm 130 PS (96 kW) (Japan)	154 N⋅m (114 lb⋅ft) at 4800 rpm 155 N⋅m (114 lb⋅ft) (Japan)	FWD	Manual (5-speed)	12.3s	113 mph (182 km/h)	35.5mpg (imperial)	189g/km	2004-2007	Europe & Japan
1.7 VTEC	D17A2	I4	1688 cc	125 PS (92 kW) at 6300 rpm 130 PS (96 kW) (Japan)	154 N⋅m (114 lb⋅ft) at 4800 rpm 155 N⋅m (114 lb⋅ft) (Japan)	FWD	Automatic (4-speed)	10.7s	113 mph (182 km/h)	?	?	2004-2007	Japan
1.7 VTEC	D17A2	I4	1688 cc	125 PS (92 kW) at 6300 rpm 130 PS (96 kW) (Japan)	154 N⋅m (114 lb⋅ft) at 4800 rpm 155 N⋅m (114 lb⋅ft) (Japan)	AWD	Automatic (4-speed)	10.7s	113 mph (182 km/h)	?	?	2004-2005	Japan
1.8 i-VTEC	R18A1	I4	1799 cc	140 PS (103 kW) at 6300 rpm	174 N⋅m (128 lb⋅ft) at 4300 rpm	FWD	Manual (6-speed)	10.6s	118 mph (190 km/h)	37.7mpg (imperial)	177g/km	2007-2009	Europe
1.8 i-VTEC	R18A1	I4	1799 cc	140 PS (103 kW) at 6300 rpm	174 N⋅m (128 lb⋅ft) at 4300 rpm	FWD	Automatic (5-speed)	12.4s	115 mph (185 km/h)	34.9mpg (imperial)	190g/km	2007-2009	Europe
2.0 i-VTEC	K20A9	I4	1998 cc	150 PS (110 kW) at 6500 rpm	191 N⋅m (141 lb⋅ft) at 4000 rpm	FWD	Manual (6-speed)	10.5s	121 mph (195 km/h)	31.7mpg (imperial)	212g/km	2004-2007	Europe
2.0 i-VTEC	K20A (Eco)	I4	1998 cc	156 PS (115 kW) at 6500 rpm	188 N⋅m (139 lb⋅ft) at 4000 rpm	FWD	Manual (5-speed)	?	?	?	?	2004-2009	Japan
2.0 i-VTEC	K20A (Eco)	I4	1998 cc	156 PS (115 kW) at 6500 rpm	188 N⋅m (139 lb⋅ft) at 4000 rpm	FWD	Automatic (5-speed)	10.7s	112 mph (180 km/h) (Note: Electronically limited)	?	?	2004-2009	Japan
2.0 i-VTEC	K20A (Eco)	I4	1998 cc	156 PS (115 kW) at 6500 rpm	188 N⋅m (139 lb⋅ft) at 4000 rpm	AWD	Automatic (4-speed)	10.7s	112 mph (180 km/h)	?	?	2004-2009	Japan
2.4 i-VTEC	K24A	I4	2354 cc	162 PS (119 kW) at 5700 rpm	218 N⋅m (161 lb⋅ft) at 4000 rpm	FWD	Automatic (5-speed)	?	?	?	?	2007-2009	Japan
Diesel Engines
2.2 i-CTDi	N22A	I4 turbo	2204 cc	140 PS (103 kW) at 4000 rpm	340 N⋅m (251 lb⋅ft) at 2000 rpm	FWD	Manual (6-speed)	10.1s	118 mph (190 km/h)	44mpg (imperial)	167g/km	2005-2009	Europe

Information regarding 1.8 i-VTEC and 2.2 i-CTDi from Honda UK Brochure. 1.7 VTEC, 2.0 i-VTEC (6-speed) and some 2.2 i-CTDi information sourced from Honda News Europe. Information regarding Japan region and 2.0 i-VTEC (5-speed) from Autozine. Further information regarding Japan region, 2.0 i-VTEC (5-speed auto) and 4-speed auto from Greenwise. Extra information for all Japan models found from TCV. Extra information for all European models found from Parkers.
