= Honda Accord (Japan and Europe eighth generation) =

Eighth generation of Honda Accord for Japanese and European markets

Honda Accord Eighth generation (CU1-3/CW1-3)
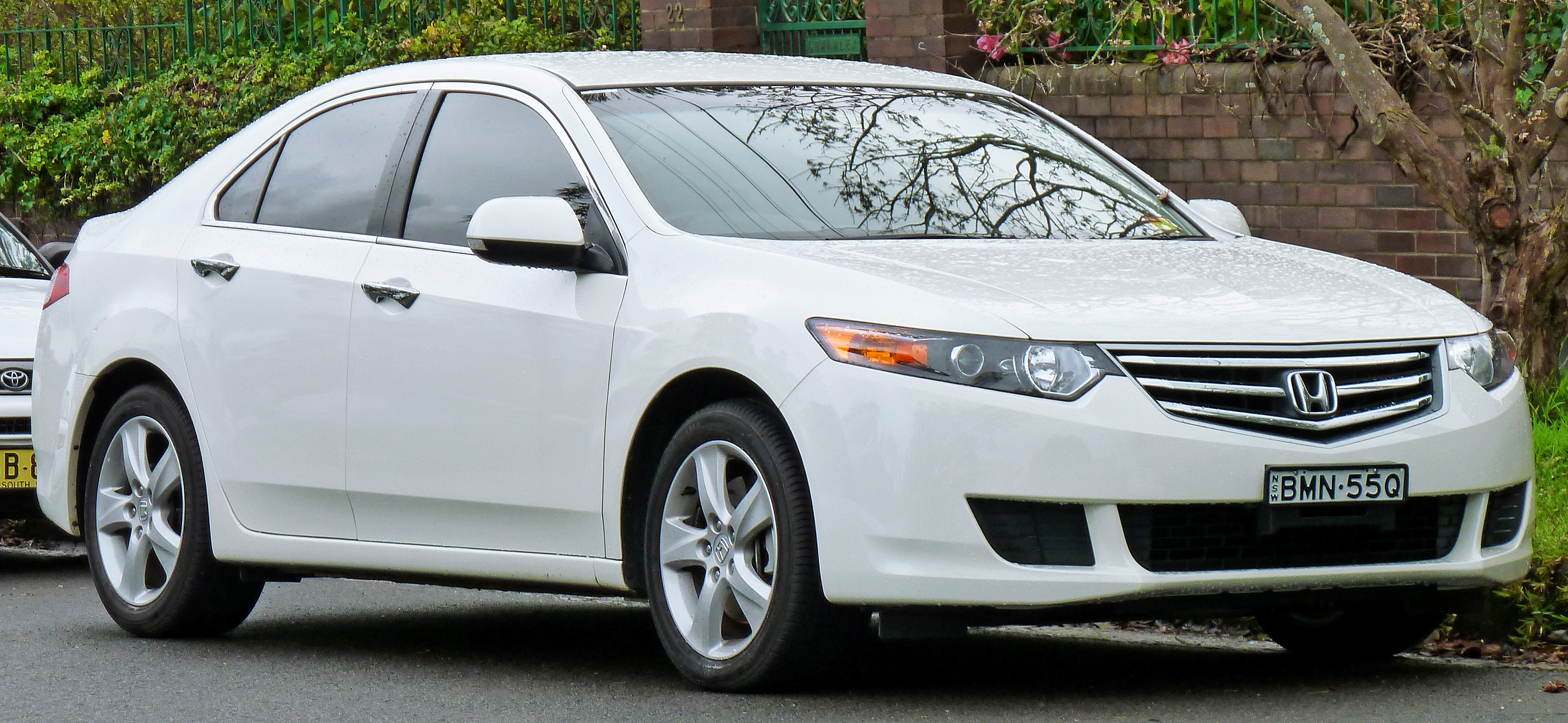

Overview
- Manufacturer: Honda
- Also called: Acura TSX (North America); Honda Spirior (China)
- Production: 2008–2015; 2009–2014 (China)
- Assembly: Japan: Sayama, Saitama (Sayama plant); United Kingdom: Swindon (HUKM); China: Wuhan (Dongfeng Honda)
- Designer: Jarad Hall (2006); Toshinobu Minami (2006) (Accord Tourer)

Body and chassis
- Class: Large family car (D)
- Body style: 4-door sedan 5-door wagon
- Layout: Front-engine, front-wheel-drive

Powertrain
- Engine: Petrol: 2.0 L R20A3 SOHC i-VTEC I4; 2.4 L K24A/Z DOHC i-VTEC I4; 3.5 L J35Z6 SOHC VTEC V6 (US only); Diesel: 2.2 L N22B i-DTEC I4 (turbo)
- Transmission: 5-speed automatic 5-speed manual 6-speed manual

Dimensions
- Wheelbase: 2,705 mm (106.5 in)
- Length: Sedan: 4,726 mm (186.1 in); Tourer: 4,740 mm (186.6 in)
- Width: 1,840 mm (72.4 in)
- Height: 1,440 mm (56.7 in)

Chronology
- Predecessor: Honda Accord (Japan and Europe seventh generation)
- Successor: Honda Accord (ninth generation)

The eighth generation Honda Accord for Japanese and European markets is a mid-size car. It went on sale in mid 2008 for the 2009 model year. The Japanese-built Accord is also sold in Australia and New Zealand as the Accord Euro. It is also available in US, Canada, and Mexico as the second-generation Acura TSX. From late 2009, it is available as Honda Spirior in China. While not as large as the North American Accord, sold in Japan as the Honda Inspire, this generation Accord is not in compliance with Japanese Governments regulations concerning exterior dimensions, and is not classified as a compact sedan in Japan.

== Overview ==
Honda revealed some detail shots and a teaser video of the European-spec Accord in January 2008, before debuting it at the Geneva Motor Show in March. The new Accord comes in both sedan and wagon forms, offering a host of engine and transmission options.

Available engines are the 2.0-litre i4, 2.4-litre i4, and 3.5-litre V6 i-VTEC petrol engines (V6 was US only), as well as the 2.2-litre i-DTEC diesel engine.

All engines come with a 6-speed manual transmission (except Japan where all lineup was automatic transmission only), while the petrol engines get in addition to that a 5-speed automatic transmission.

Dimensionally, the Accord has become longer, wider, and lower for a sleek, sporty look, along with sharper body lines and slightly redesigned headlights. Honda has built the Accord on its new ACE body structure, available with a host of new safety features.

In Australia, the Euro variant of this model won the prestigious Wheels Car of the Year award for 2008. It also won the South African Car Of The Year award for 2009. In March 2012, Wheels magazine Australia compared 11 mid-sized sedans, and the Accord Euro won top position.

Production ended at the end of February 2015 for Australian and New Zealand spec models, with sales lasting until the end of 2015. Sales also ended in Europe, Israel, and Turkey as well.

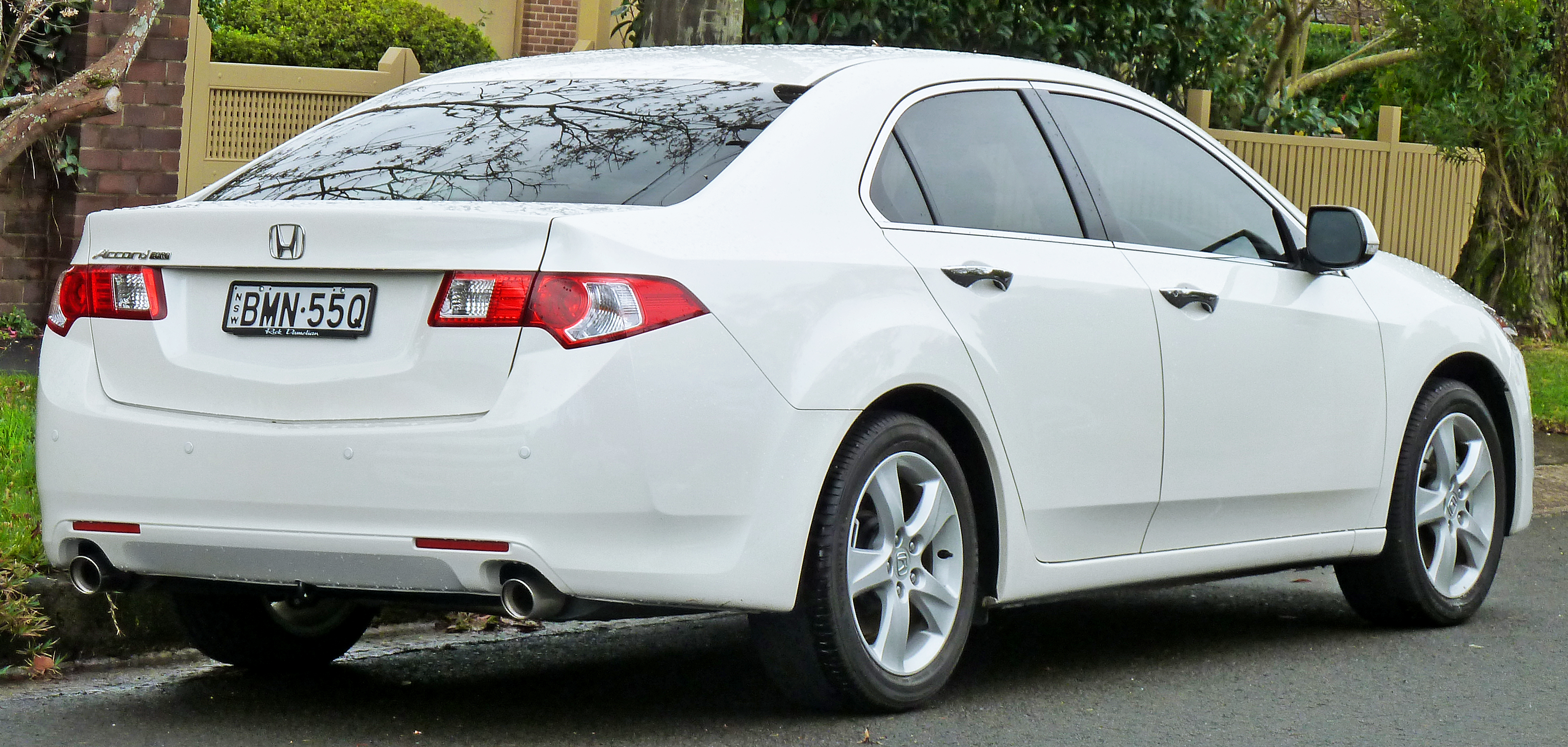
Pre-facelift Honda Accord Euro sedan (Australia)

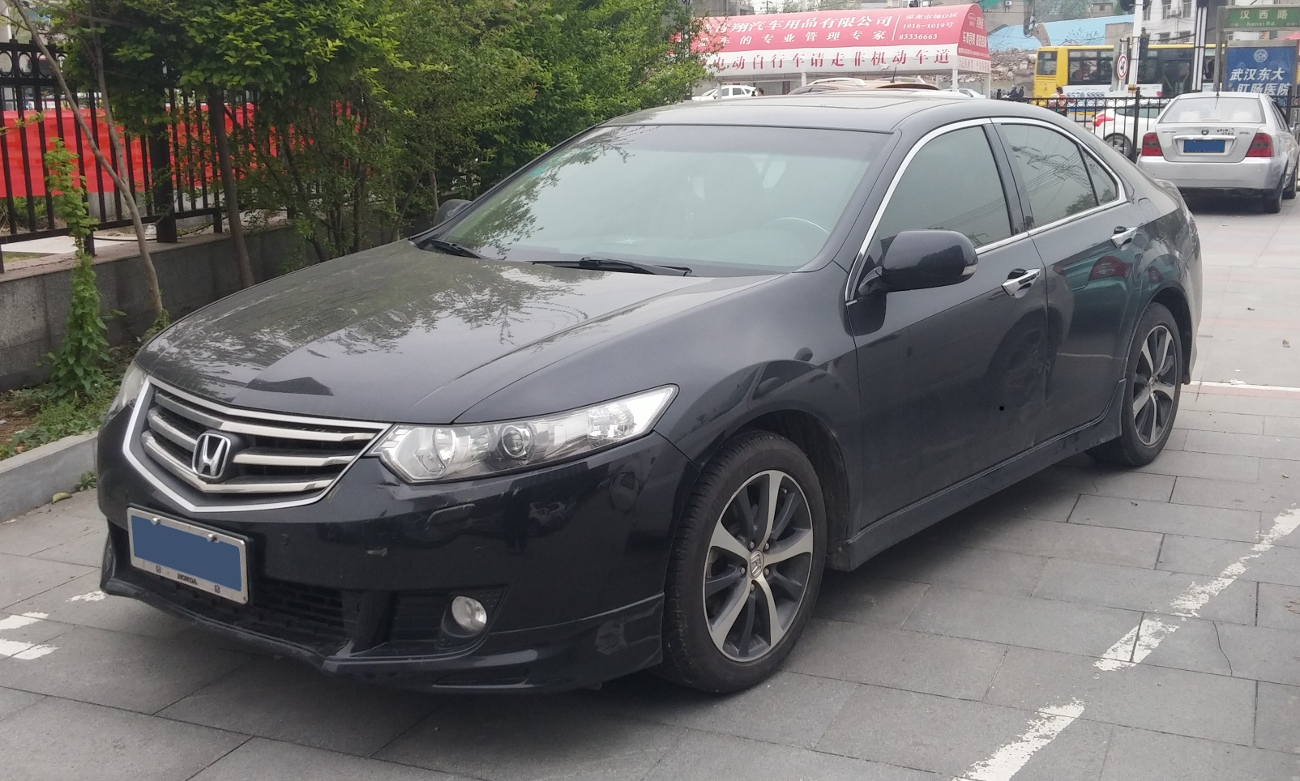
Honda Spirior (China; pre-facelift)

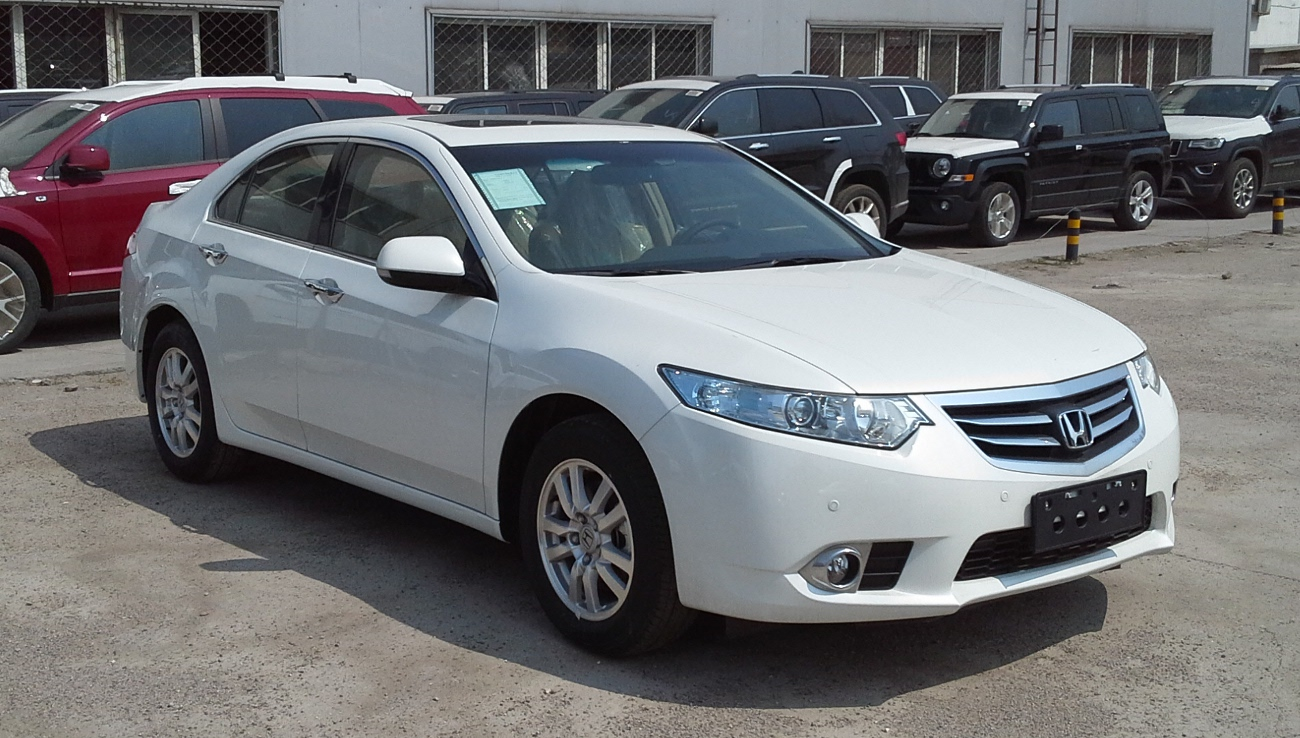
Honda Spirior (China; facelift)

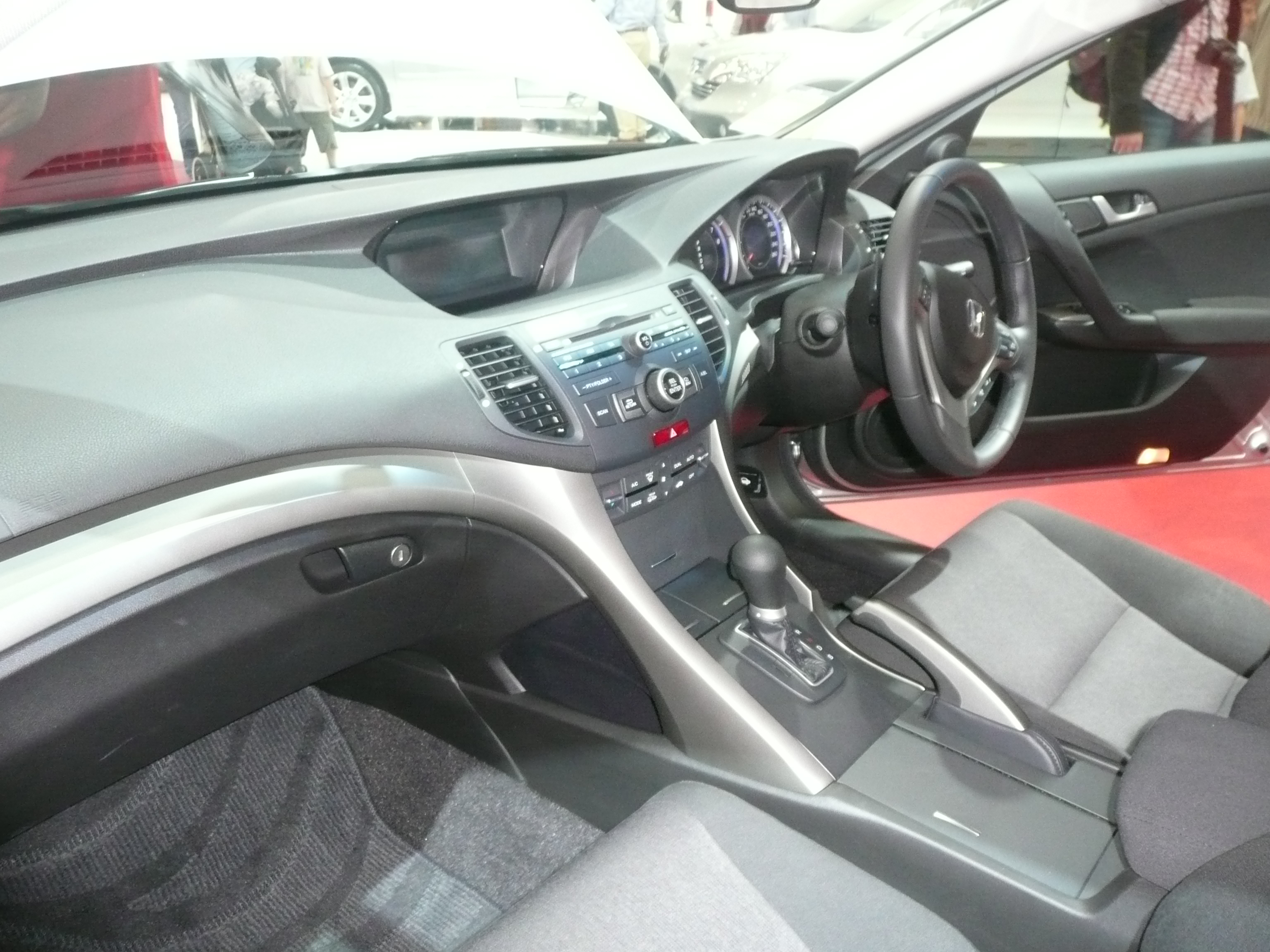
Interior

== Accord Tourer (CW) ==
It was a version with wagon body. The concept vehicle was unveiled at the 2007 Frankfurt Motor Show.

Production version included 2.4 L DOHC i-VTEC engine rated 206 PS (152 kW; 203 hp), 5-speed automatic transmission with paddle shifters.

The vehicle went on sale on December 5, 2008 in Japan. The Tourer was also released in the US as the Acura TSX Sport Wagon in Fall 2010 as a 2011 model.

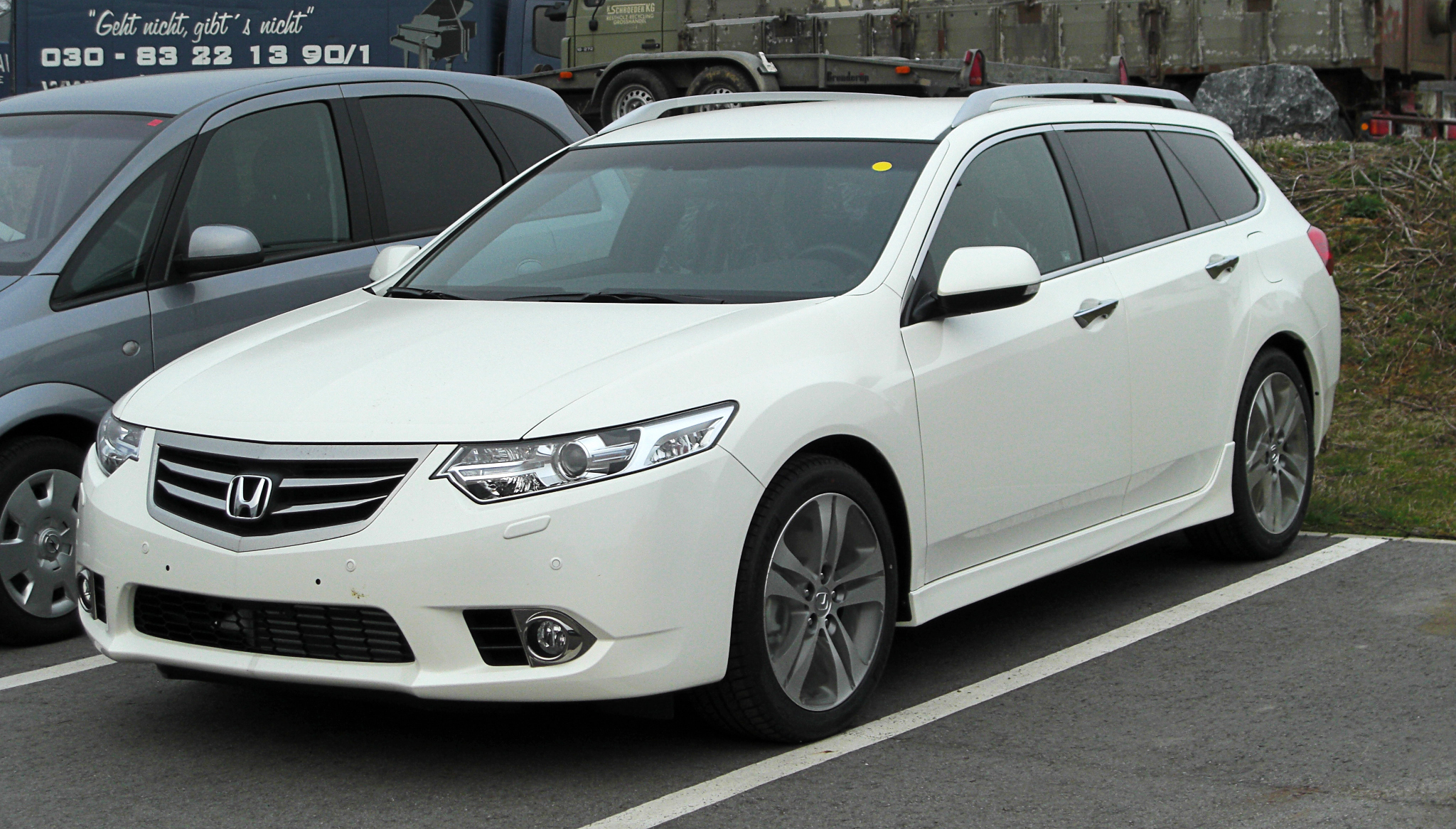
Facelift Honda Accord Tourer (Germany)

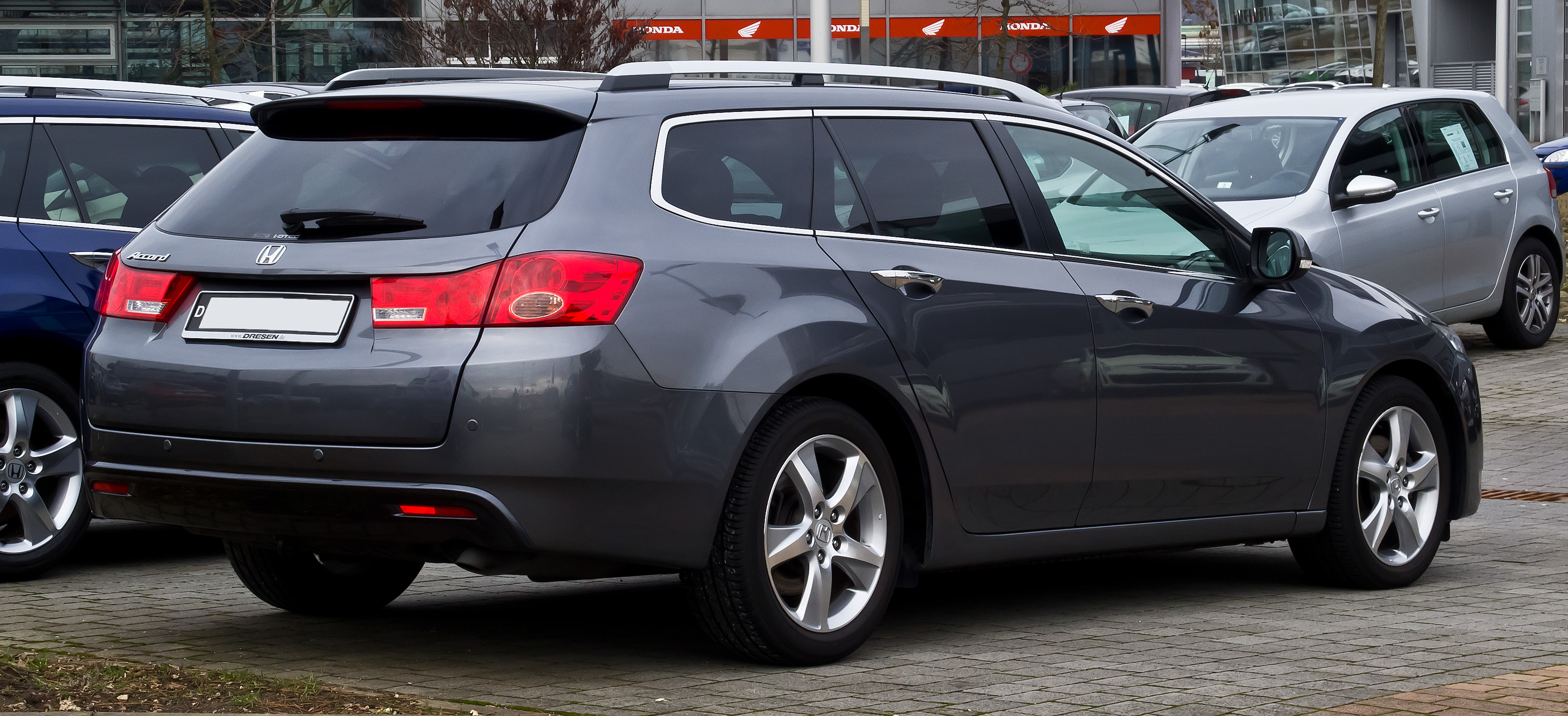
Facelift Honda Accord Tourer (Germany)

== Accord Type S ==
The Accord Type S was unveiled at the Geneva Motor Show in March 2008.

The Type S is available in both Saloon and Tourer. The Type S has 18" alloy wheels, a front spoiler, and a rear diffuser (Saloon only) which differentiate it from the other models.

The Type S runs with the improved iDTEC 2.2 diesel engine which now has 180 PS (132 kW; 178 hp). The increased power is due to a modified turbo, cylinder head and larger intercooler. Also, the radiator has grown in size. In addition, the clutch has been updated to handle the increased torque of 380 Nm over the standard 350 Nm.

The front brake discs on the Type S are larger in diameter than the saloon versions being 320 mm Ø the 150ps versions have 300 mm Ø Front discs, using twin piston brake calipers (instead of single). Note: this larger brake setup is used for all Australian-delivered Accord Euros regardless of specification.

Other Type S additions are red lighting in the dash and in the courtesy lights in the footwells and in the map lighting binnacle.

In addition to increased power, the torque is now up from 350 N⋅m (258 lb⋅ft) to 380 N⋅m (280 lb⋅ft).

== Honda Accord Mugen 24sc ==
It is a concept car with a supercharged K24A inline four engine, 6-speed manual transmission, 245/35R19 tires. The vehicle was unveiled at the 2009 Tokyo Auto Salon.

== Australia ==
The Accord Euro, which had been selling along the larger US-designed Accord in Australia and New Zealand since 2003, was launched in Australia in June 2008 as the second generation. Beginning at A$32,990, the Euro's base model contained a plethora of equipment, including dual-zone climate control, power windows, and an auxiliary jack. Serving as the central model, the "Luxury", starting from A$39,990 added a sunroof, leather interior, fog-lights, front/rear parking sensors, and rain-sensing windscreen wipers, (among others). The flagship model, the "Luxury Navi" started at A$42,990 added a navigation system and a rear parking camera.

All models carried the 2.4 engine, which had been refined, resulting in improved outputs of 148kW, (compared to 140kW previously), and better fuel economy, reducing from 9.1L/100KM to 8.9L/100KM, among other things.

All models came with side/curtain airbags, front active head restraints as well as ABS and Honda's Vehicle Stability Assist program.

In October 2014, it was announced by Honda Australia's director, Stephen Collins, that the Accord Euro would be pulled from the market in July 2015 due to cessation of production in Japan. The second generation Euro had amassed approximately 25,000 sales within Australia, making it a strong competitor within Australia's mid-size class.

== Mechanical ==
=== Engines ===
Model	Chassis Code	Type/code	Power, torque@rpm
Petrol engines
K24A (JDM)	CU2 (Sedan); CW2 (Tourer)	2,354 cc (2.354 L; 143.6 cu in) I4 (K24A)	206 PS (152 kW; 203 hp) at 7,000, 232 N⋅m (171 lb⋅ft) at 4300
R20A (JDM); R20A3	CU1 (Sedan); CW1 (Tourer)	1,997 cc (1.997 L; 121.9 cu in) I4 SOHC i-VTEC (R20A3)	156 PS (115 kW; 154 hp) at 6300, 192 N⋅m (142 lb⋅ft) at 4100 (95RON)
K24Z3	CU2 (Sedan); CW2 (Tourer)	2,354 cc (2.354 L; 143.6 cu in) I4 DOHC i-VTEC	201 PS (148 kW; 198 hp) at 7000, 230 N⋅m (170 lb⋅ft) at 4200 (95RON)
Diesel engines
N22B1	CU3 (Sedan); CW3 (Tourer)	2,199 cc (2.199 L; 134.2 cu in) I4 DOHC i-DTEC (N22B)	150 PS (110 kW; 148 hp) at 4000, 350 N⋅m (258 lb⋅ft) at 2000
N22B2	CU3 (Sedan); CW3 (Tourer)	2,199 cc (2.199 L; 134.2 cu in) I4 DOHC i-DTEC	180 PS (132 kW; 178 hp) at 4000, 380 N⋅m (280 lb⋅ft) at 2000

== Safety ==
ANCAP test results Honda Accord Euro variant(s) as tested (2008)
Test	Score
Overall	5 /5 stars
Frontal offset	14.48/16
Side impact	15.41/16
Pole	2/2
Seat belt reminders	3/3
Whiplash protection	Not Assessed
Pedestrian protection	Adequate
Electronic stability control	Standard
