= Honda N engine =

Japanese automotive diesel engines

The N series is Honda's first automotive diesel engine, an inline-four for medium-sized vehicles. It uses common rail direct injection, which Honda brands as i-CTDi (Intelligent Common-rail Turbocharged Direct injection). The most notable feature is the aluminium block, which uses proprietary technology in the manufacturing process to provide light weight and high rigidity. Roller chains drive two overhead camshafts. A variable-geometry turbocharger and intercooler are used.

== N15A1 (Earth Dreams i-DTEC) ==
The i-DTEC engine uses a 2-Stage turbocharger from Wastegate Type & Variable Geometry Turbocharger (VGT) left/right. It enables strong power from about 1,500 rpm. With Diesel particulate filter (DPF), Start-stop system, Exhaust gas recirculation system (EGR) & Small Size Intercooler.

Specifications

- Bore & Stroke: 76 mm × 82.5 mm (2.99 in × 3.25 in)
- Cylinder Layout: inline 4
- Displacement: 1.5 L (1,498 cc)
- Valve Configuration: 16-valve DOHC
- Type: i-DTEC
- Compression ratio: 16.0:1
- Max boost: 13.5 psi (0.93 bar)
- Max power: 100 hp (75 kW; 101 PS) at 3600 rpm
- Max torque: 200 N⋅m (148 lb⋅ft) at 1750 rpm
- Redline: 4500 rpm

=== Applications ===
- Honda City (2003–2023)
- Honda Amaze (2013–2023)
- Honda Mobilio (2015–2018)
- Honda Jazz (2015-2020)
- Honda BR-V (2015–2020)
- Honda WR-V (2016–2023)

== N16A (Earth Dreams i-DTEC) ==
Earth Dreams Technology. The engine uses either a single (N16A1/2) or bi-turbocharger (N16A4) from Wastegate Type & Variable Geometry Turbocharger (VGT). It enables strong power from about 1,500 rpm. With Diesel particulate filter (DPF), Idele Stop System, Exhaust gas recirculation system (EGR) & Small Size Intercooler.

Honda N16A (Earth Dreams i-DTEC)
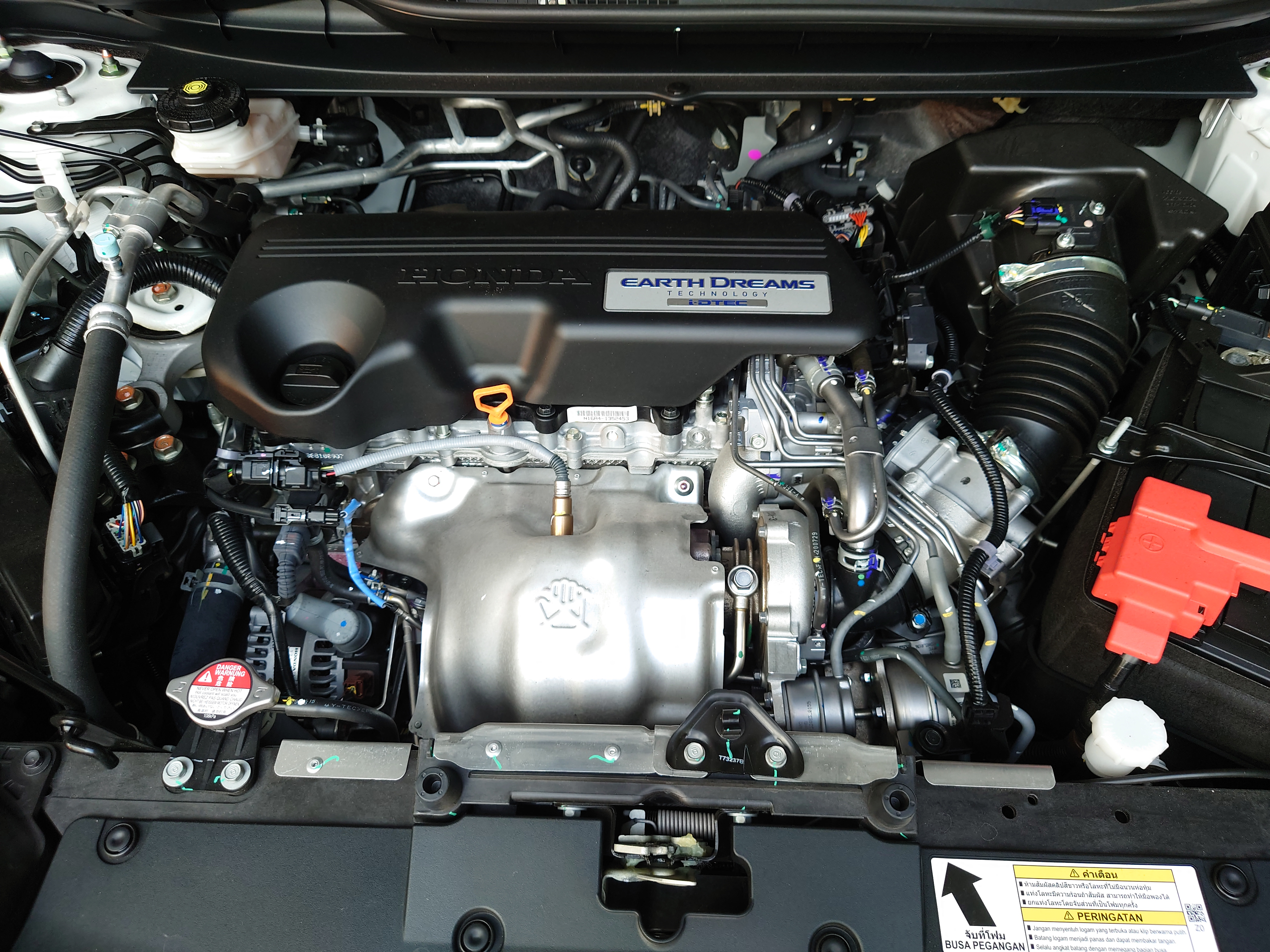

Overview
- Manufacturer: Honda
- Production: 2013–2022

Layout
- Configuration: I4
- Displacement: 1.6 L; 97.5 cu in (1,598 cc)
- Cylinder bore: 76 mm (2.992 in)
- Piston stroke: 88 mm (3.465 in)
- Valvetrain: DOHC
- Compression ratio: 16.0:1

RPM range
- Max. engine speed: 4500 rpm

Combustion
- Turbocharger: 1 (N16A1, N16A2, N16A3, N16A5); 2 (N16A4)
- Fuel system: Common rail Direct injection
- Management: ECU
- Fuel type: Diesel
- Cooling system: Water-cooled

Applications

Engine	Application	Power	Torque
N16A1	2013–2016 Honda Civic (FK3)	120 hp (89 kW) @ 4000 RPM	220 lb⋅ft (300 N⋅m) @ 2000 RPM
N16A1	2017–2022 Honda Civic (FC8/FK9)	120 hp (89 kW) @ 4000 RPM	220 lb⋅ft (300 N⋅m) @ 2000 RPM
N16A2	2015–2018 Honda CR-V (RE6, FWD)	120 hp (89 kW) @ 4000 RPM	220 lb⋅ft (300 N⋅m) @ 2000 RPM
N16A3	2014–2022 Honda HR-V (RU8)	120 hp (89 kW) @ 4000 RPM	220 lb⋅ft (300 N⋅m) @ 2000 RPM
N16A4	2015–2018 Honda CR-V (RE6, AWD)	160 hp (120 kW) @ 4000 RPM	260 lb⋅ft (350 N⋅m) @ 2000 RPM
N16A4	2017–2022 Honda CR-V (RW7/RW8) (Thailand)	160 hp (120 kW) @ 4000 RPM	260 lb⋅ft (350 N⋅m) @ 2000 RPM
N16A5	2017–2022 Honda CR-V (RW7/RW8) (India/Philippines)	120 hp (89 kW) @ 4000 RPM	220 lb⋅ft (300 N⋅m) @ 2000 RPM

== N22A (i-CTDi) ==
The i-CTDi engine uses a variable-nozzle turbocharger from Honeywell or Garrett. It enables strong power from about 1,500 rpm. This Honda engine is exclusive to European markets where Honda could operate. It meets Euro 4 emission standards

Honda N22A (i-CTDi)

Overview
- Manufacturer: Honda
- Production: 2002–2011

Layout
- Configuration: I4
- Displacement: 2.2 L; 134.5 cu in (2,204 cc)
- Cylinder bore: 85 mm (3.346 in)
- Piston stroke: 97.1 mm (3.823 in)
- Valvetrain: DOHC
- Compression ratio: 16.7:1

RPM range
- Max. engine speed: 4500 rpm

Combustion
- Turbocharger: 1
- Fuel system: Common rail Direct injection
- Management: ECU
- Fuel type: Diesel
- Cooling system: Water-cooled

Applications

Engine	Application	Power	Torque
N22A1	2002–2008 Honda Accord (CN1/CN2)	140 hp (100 kW) @ 4000 RPM	250 lb⋅ft (340 N⋅m) @ 2000 RPM
N22A1	2004–2009 Honda FR-V (BE5)	140 hp (100 kW) @ 4000 RPM	250 lb⋅ft (340 N⋅m) @ 2000 RPM
N22A2	2005–2006 Honda CR-V (RD9, FWD)	140 hp (100 kW) @ 4000 RPM	250 lb⋅ft (340 N⋅m) @ 2000 RPM
N22A2	2007–2009 Honda CR-V (RE6)	140 hp (100 kW) @ 4000 RPM	250 lb⋅ft (340 N⋅m) @ 2000 RPM
N22A2	2006–2010 Honda Civic (FN3/FK3)	140 hp (100 kW) @ 4000 RPM	250 lb⋅ft (340 N⋅m) @ 2000 RPM

== N22B (i-DTEC) ==
Whilst the N22A has the intake ports on the front of the engine, the N22B has the new standard rear intake/front exhaust port configuration. The stroke has been slightly reduced to qualify for sub-2200 cc engine displacement, for tax and registration purposes in some jurisdictions. The N22A has an exhaust on the rear of the engine. It meets Euro 5 emission standards

Honda N22B (i-DTEC)
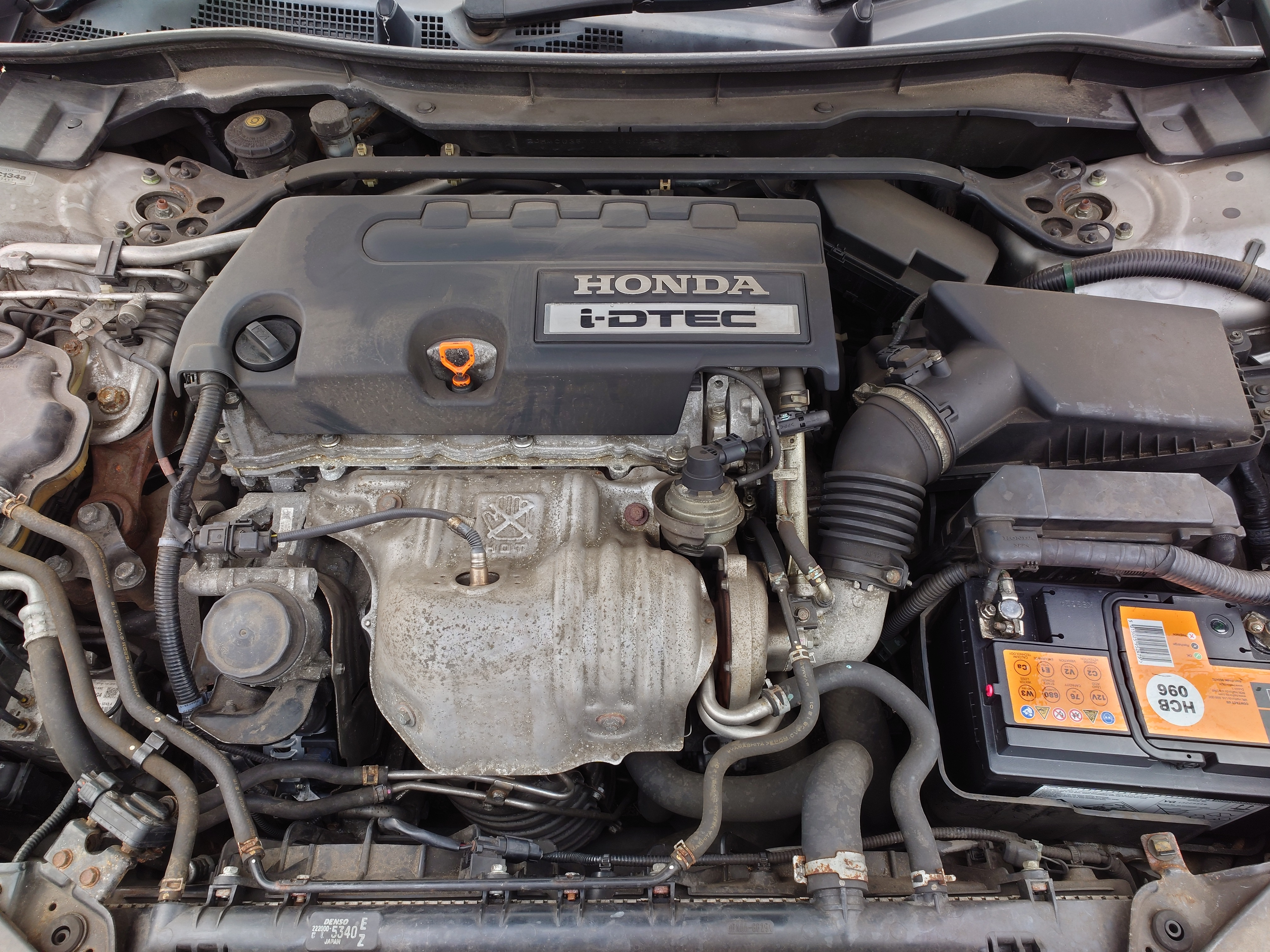

Overview
- Manufacturer: Honda
- Production: 2008–2015

Layout
- Configuration: I4
- Displacement: 2.2 L; 134.2 cu in (2,199 cc)
- Cylinder bore: 85 mm (3.346 in)
- Piston stroke: 96.9 mm (3.815 in)
- Valvetrain: DOHC
- Compression ratio: 16.3:1

RPM range
- Max. engine speed: 4500 rpm

Combustion
- Turbocharger: 1
- Fuel system: Common rail Direct injection
- Management: ECU
- Fuel type: Diesel
- Cooling system: Water-cooled

Applications

Engine	Application	Power	Torque
N22B1	2008–2015 Honda Accord ES and EX (CU3/CW3)	150 hp (110 kW) @ 4000 RPM	260 lb⋅ft (350 N⋅m) @ 2000 RPM
N22B2	2008–2015 Honda Accord Type S (CU3/CW3)	180 hp (130 kW) @ 4000 RPM	280 lb⋅ft (380 N⋅m) @ 2000 RPM
N22B3	2010–2012 Honda CR-V (RE6)	150 hp (110 kW) @ 4000 RPM	260 lb⋅ft (350 N⋅m) @ 2000 RPM
N22B4	2013–2014 Honda CR-V (RE6)	150 hp (110 kW) @ 4000 RPM	260 lb⋅ft (350 N⋅m) @ 2000 RPM
N22B4	2011–2012 Honda Civic (FK3)	150 hp (110 kW) @ 4000 RPM	260 lb⋅ft (350 N⋅m) @ 2000 RPM

== See also ==
- Circle L engine
- List of Honda engines
