= Honda Accord (Japan and Europe seventh generation) =

Honda Accord Seventh generation (CL7-9/CM1-3/CN1-2)
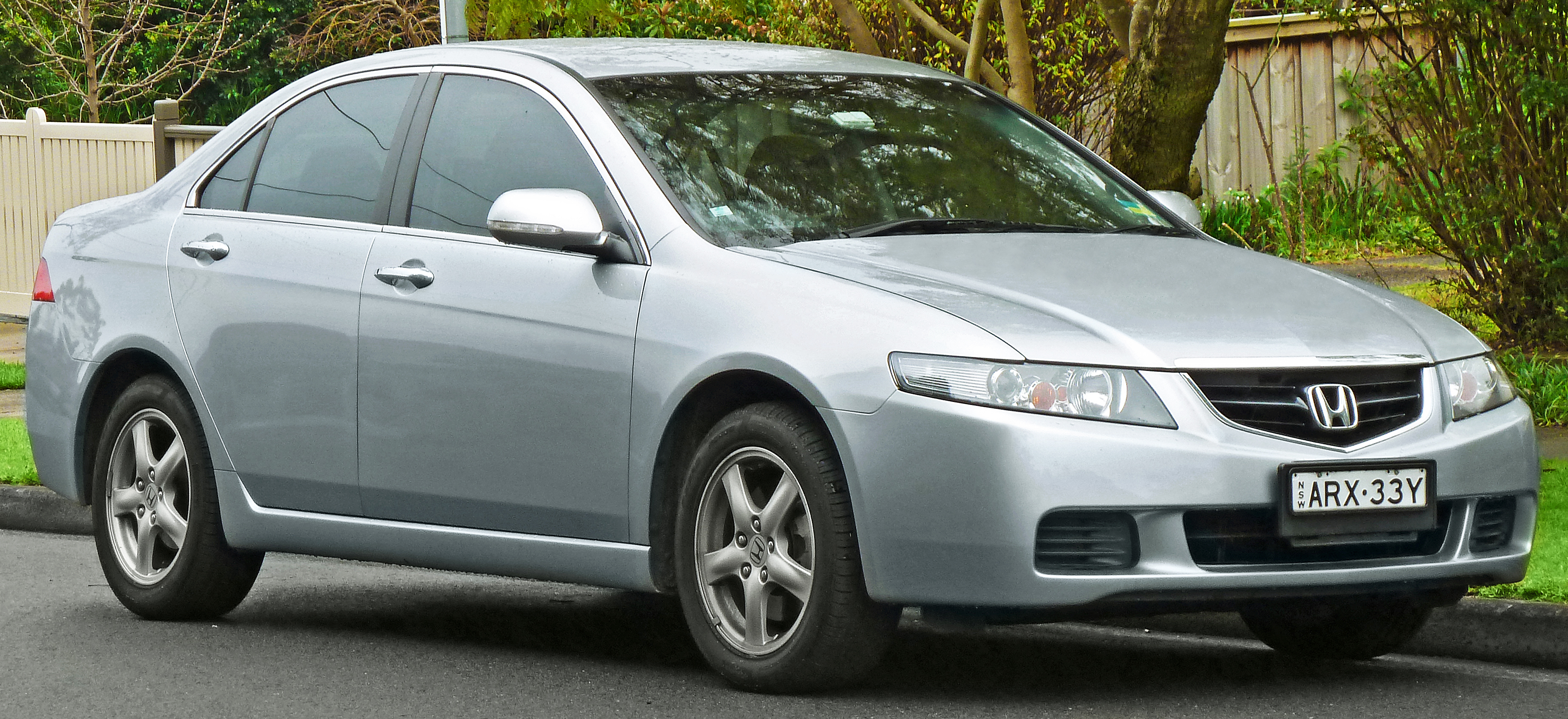

Overview
- Manufacturer: Honda
- Also called: Honda Accord Euro (Australia and New Zealand); Acura TSX (North America)
- Production: October 2002–November 2008
- Assembly: Japan: Sayama, Saitama (Honda Sayama plant)
- Designer: Kunihiko Tachibana, Hiroshi Ishibani, Hideyuki Ikeda, Yasuharu Ishino (2002)

Body and chassis
- Class: Mid-size/Large family car (D)
- Body style: 4-door sedan (CL7, CL8, CL9 & CN1); 5-door wagon (CM1, CM2, CM3 & CN2)
- Layout: Front-engine, front-wheel-drive Front-engine, four-wheel-drive

Powertrain
- Engine: Petrol: 2.0 L K20A DOHC i-VTEC I4; 2.0 L K20A6 DOHC i-VTEC I4; 2.0 L K20Z2 DOHC i-VTEC I4; 2.4 L K24A DOHC i-VTEC I4; 2.4 L K24A3 DOHC i-VTEC I4; Diesel: 2.2 L N22A1 DOHC i-CTDi I4
- Transmission: 5-speed automatic 5-speed manual 6-speed manual

Dimensions
- Wheelbase: 2,670 mm (105.1 in)
- Length: Sedan: 4,665 mm (183.7 in); Wagon: 4,750 mm (187.0 in)
- Width: 1,760 mm (69.3 in)
- Height: Sedan: 1,445 mm (56.9 in); Wagon: 1,495 mm (58.9 in)
- Curb weight: Sedan: 1,360–1,490 kg (2,998–3,285 lb); Wagon: 1,473–1,619 kg (3,247–3,569 lb)

Chronology
- Predecessor: Honda Accord (Japan sixth generation) CF3/4/5/CL2/3; Honda Accord (Europe sixth generation) CG7/8/9/CH5/6/7/8; Honda Torneo (Japan)
- Successor: Honda Accord (Japan and Europe eighth generation)

The seventh-generation Honda Accord for the European and Japanese markets is a mid-size car (large family car in the UK, D-segment in Europe) that was available as a four-door sedan or a five-door station wagon and was produced by Honda from October 2002 (for the 2003 model year) to November 2008. It won the 2002-03 Japan Car of the Year upon its launch.

For this generation, the European and Japanese Accords, previously separate models, were consolidated into a single version designed to be more competitive in the European market. It became a top seller in its class in Australia, where over 45,000 sedans were sold between 2003 and 2008. The car was also exported to the United States and Canada, where it was sold as the Acura TSX. Outside Japan and North America the first Honda-built diesel engine was offered. In the Japanese market, the Accord was merged into the Torneo range to compete against the Mazda Atenza and Subaru Legacy.

The consolidation of the Japanese and European models was met with some skepticism in Japan at the time, with journalists suggesting Honda was abandoning the Japanese platform in favor of prioritizing foreign markets. Honda suggested that delivering a vehicle achieving that of a "European standard" was in line with what prospective Accord owners in Japan were expecting, compared to buyers of kei cars or compact cars. Compared to its predecessor, the seventh generation features a wider and heavier body, with improvements to aerodynamics, structural rigidity, and tread width. The sedan variant achieves a drag coefficient of 0.26, marking a significant enhancement in aerodynamic efficiency.

Unlike the previous generation, the sedan and wagon variants were developed and released simultaneously. The wagon’s design from the B-pillar rearward was created independently by a separate designer, allowing greater flexibility in its core design elements rather than simply extending the roofline and cargo area.

A variant of the larger North American Accord was sold in Japan as the Honda Inspire to compete in the entry-level luxury sedan class. In markets where both versions of the Accord are sold, such as in New Zealand and Australia, the smaller Japan/Europe-type car is called Accord Euro to distinguish it from the larger North American model.

== Body styles ==
The seventh-generation Accord was offered as a four-door sedan in Japan, Europe and the United Kingdom with two petrol engine options; the 2.0L K20A engine and the 2.4L K24A engine. In Australia and New Zealand, the sedan was available exclusively with the 2.4L engine. A 2.2L turbo-diesel engine option, the Honda N22A1 was also offered for the first time, exclusive to the European market.

A five-door wagon version was also offered, sold as the Accord Wagon in the Japanese market and the Accord Tourer in Europe. The wagon variant was not sold in Australia or New Zealand. The engine options were the same for both the wagon and the sedan.

== Australia and New Zealand ==
Launched in July 2003 for the 2004 model year, the seventh-generation Accord was marketed as the 'Accord Euro' in Australia and New Zealand. It was offered exclusively as a sedan with the 2.4L K24 engine only and a choice between a 5-speed automatic or 6-speed manual transmission. Two trim levels were available, Euro and Euro Luxury. Features such as VSA, ABS, anti-theft immobiliser, cruise control, power folding door mirrors, six disc CD changer, folding rear seats and a leather steering wheel were standard on both trim levels. The Euro Luxury trim, included additional features such as a sunroof, curtain airbags, wooden interior trim, HID headlights, rain sensing wipers, fog lamps, electrically adjustable and heated front seats and a full leather interior. Honda also offered an optional factory bodykit with different front and rear bumpers, a trunk spoiler and side skirts.

In the 2006 model year, Honda introduced updated headlights and a redesigned front end, as well as offering the Honda InterNavi HDD based Navigation System as an option for the 'Euro Luxury' trim. For the final model year, Honda offered the Accord Euro with an optional sports bodykit, 17" wheels, dark chrome door handles, black side window mouldings and red instrument cluster backlight.

== Europe and United Kingdom ==
The seventh-generation Accord was sold in the UK and Europe in both sedan and wagon body styles, the latter sold as the 'Accord Tourer'. Multiple variants were offered with different engine and transmission choices.

Many features came as standard, such as eight airbags, a perimeter alarm system, remote entry, locking wheel nuts, dual zone climate control, heated and power folding door mirrors, folding rear seats and a 6 speaker sound system. The Executive trim levels came with additional features as standard such as a sunroof, rain sensing wipers, electrically adjustable and heated front seats, 8 speaker sound system and the InterNavi DVD Navigation System (standard on 2.4 Executive only).

A large variety of accessories were offered as optional extras, such as 17" alloy wheels available in different designs, rear, side and front mouldings, sportier front and rear bumpers and side skirts, wooden trim in the interior, rear screen entertainment, dog guard (Tourer only), aluminium gearshift knob (manual transmissions only), lowered suspension, trunk spoiler with integrated brake light, parking sensors, 8-disc CD changer and bluetooth handsfree calling integration.

Honda Accord Variants Europe/UK
Trim	2.0 SE	2.0 Sport	2.0 Executive	2.2 Sport	2.2 Executive	2.4 Type S	2.4 Executive
Engine	1998cc i-VTEC DOHC			2204cc i-CTDi DOHC		2354cc i-VTEC DOHC	
5-speed manual transmission	Standard			Standard until 2006 facelift		Not Available	
6-speed manual transmission	Not Available			Standard from 2006 facelift		Standard	
5-speed automatic transmission	Optional			Not Available			Optional

The 2006 model year refresh for the seventh-generation Accord included updated headlights and new bumpers. Honda introduced ADAS features to the Accord in the Europe and the UK, making them no longer exclusive to the Japanese market. The 2.0 Sport trim was replaced by the 2.0 Type S trim for the 2006 - 2008 model years. LKAS and ACC were only available on the highest trim; 2.4 Executive (with ADAS). Optional extras were updated, now offering an embossed door step garnish, sunshades, various styles of 17" wheels as well as the addition of an 18" wheel option, a new ducktail spoiler for the trunk lid and blue ambient lighting.

== Japan ==
In Japan, the seventh-generation Accord was offered in both body styles, all models used the same 5-speed automatic transmission and were available in multiple trim levels and could be optioned with either front-wheel drive (FWD) or all-wheel drive (AWD). Standard equipment across all trim levels included two front airbags, ABS, ISOFIX child seat anchors, steering wheel multimedia buttons and dual-zone climate control.

The highest trim level, known as 24TL for the sedan and 24T for the wagon featured additional equipment as standard, such as cruise control, vehicle stability assist (VSA), the smart key entry system, eight-way electrically adjustable drivers seat, automatic headlights and rain-sensing windscreen wipers.

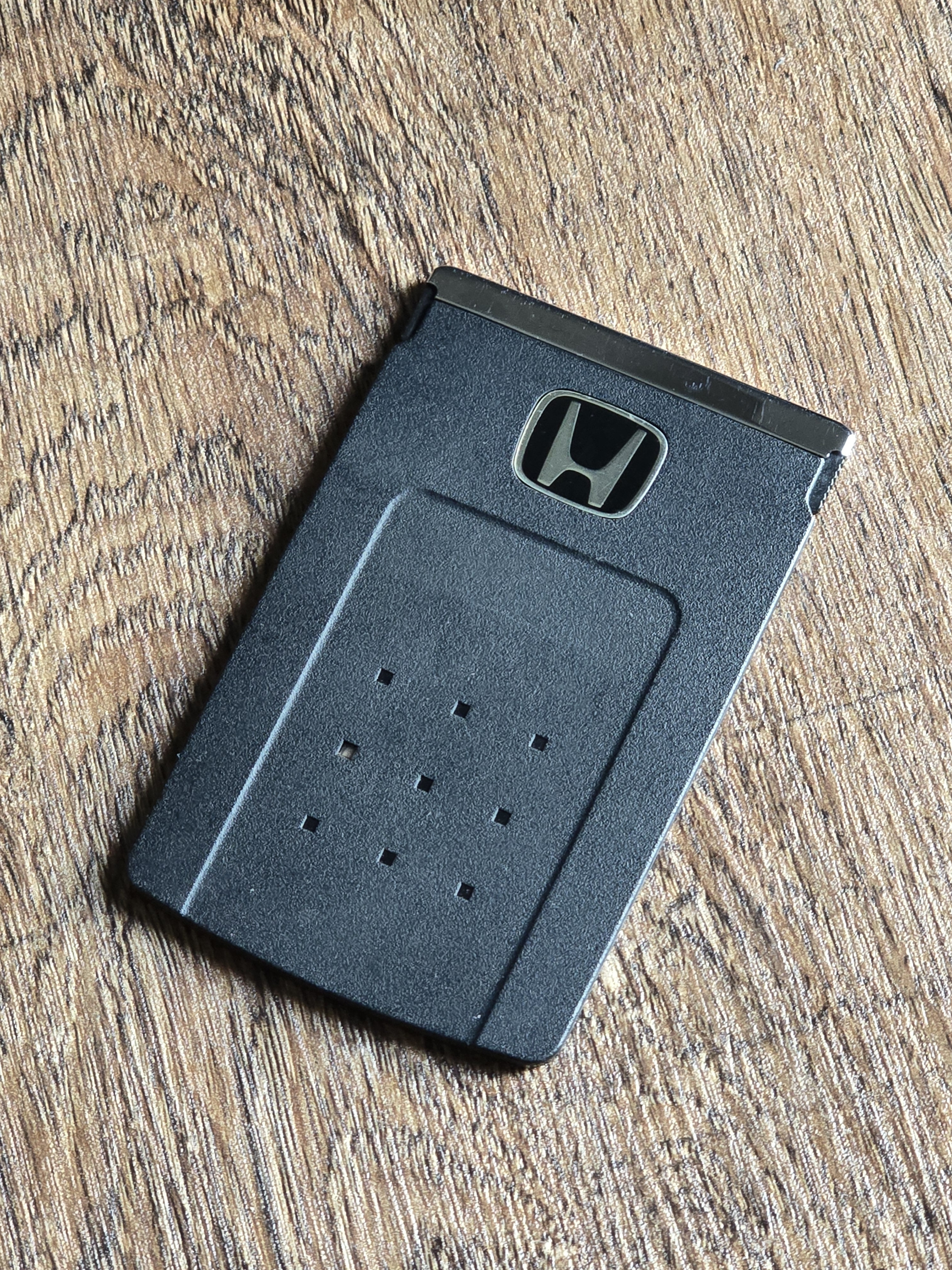
The card-key used to unlock and start the 7th Generation Honda Accord

Honda only offered the Smart Key keyless entry system in the Japanese market. It used several antennas and sensors to determine the distance of the person carrying the card-key and allowed them to unlock the doors simply by touching the drivers side door handle. The doors would automatically lock once the card-key was out of range of the sensors. The card-key also allowed turning on the ignition without the use of the physical key, simply by turning a knob attached to the ignition switch.

Optional features across all trim levels included the Honda InterNavi DVD Navigation System with a 7" touchscreen, knee and curtain airbags, a sunroof, heated leather seats, premium audio with a six disc CD changer and eight speakers, power tailgate (wagon only) and a first for the Accord, the Honda Intelligent Driver Support System (HiDS) which featured Lane Keeping Assist System (LKAS) and Intelligent Highway Cruise Control (IHCC) using a mmWave radar mounted in the front radiator grille and a camera mounted on the front windscreen.

The 2006 mid-cycle refresh of the Accord introduced several updates and new features, including auto-leveling headlights, a new HDD-based InterNavi Navigation System, and an updated instrument cluster with red or blue illumination depending on the trim level. It also featured redesigned headlights, a revised front bumper, grille, and hood, along with the addition of a new “Type S” trim level.

=== AWD variant ===
In Japan, an AWD variant of the Accord was offered in both Sedan (CL8) and Wagon (CM3) forms. The sedan was offered with the Eco 2.0 Engine and automatic transmission only. Some models were fitted with smaller brakes to fit the smaller 15 inch (195/65R15) wheel and tyres. The Wagon was offered with the 2.4 engine (in both high output and low output versions).

=== Performance Variant: Euro R (CL7) ===
The Euro R was a high performance version of the Accord exclusive to the Japanese market. It was powered by a 1,998 cc (2.0 L; 121.9 cu in) high performance K20A engine rated at 220 PS (162 kW; 217 hp) at 8000 rpm and 21 kg⋅m (206 N⋅m; 152 lb⋅ft) at 6000 rpm, 6-speed manual transmission, limited slip differential, lightweight flywheel, strut-brace, bodykit, Recaro seats, Momo steering wheel, HID headlights, Type-R red instrument cluster, aluminum pedals, shift knob and 17-inch wheels. The 215/45R17 tires were larger and wider than the base model, similar to the Type S trim. The springs, stabilizers, and bushings were adjusted for a firmer ride, with the damping force optimized to improve handling. The Euro R K20A engine includes a secondary-force counterbalance shaft, which is not present in other Type R K20A variants. This system reduces engine vibration at the expense of some power output, and operates at rotational speeds exceeding 16,000 rpm. A Mugen Motorsports concept was unveiled at the 2009 Pro shop Refill.

The CL7 chassis code is shared with the base model Accord in Japan, using an Eco version of the 2.0 engine rated at 155 PS (114 kW; 153 hp), offered in auto transmission only with none of the other performance and visual enhancements.

== Engines ==
=== Europe, Australia and New Zealand ===
Engine	Model Years	Chassis code	Horsepower	Torque
2.0L K20A6 i-VTEC I4	2003 - 2005	CL7 (Sedan); CM1 (Tourer)	155 PS (114 kW) at 6,500 rpm	190 N⋅m (140 lb⋅ft) at 4,000 rpm
2.0L K20Z2 i-VTEC I4	2006 - 2008	CL7 (Sedan); CM1 (Tourer)	155 PS (114 kW) at 6,000 rpm	190 N⋅m (140 lb⋅ft) at 4,500 rpm
2.2L N22A1 i-CTDi I4	2003 - 2008	CN1 (Sedan); CN2 (Tourer)	140 PS (103 kW) at 4,000 rpm	340 N⋅m (251 lb⋅ft) at 2,000 rpm
2.4L K24A3 i-VTEC I4	2003 - 2008	CL9 (Sedan); CM2 (Tourer)	190 PS (140 kW) at 6,800 rpm	223 N⋅m (164 lb⋅ft) at 4,500 rpm

=== Japan ===
Engine	Chassis code	Horsepower	Torque
2.0L K20A (Eco) i-VTEC I4	CL7 (Sedan FWD); CM1 (Wagon 20A)	155 PS (114 kW) at 6,500 rpm	188 N⋅m (139 lb⋅ft) at 4,000 rpm
2.0L K20A (Eco) i-VTEC I4	CL8 (Sedan AWD)	152 PS (112 kW) at 6,500 rpm	186 N⋅m (137 lb⋅ft) at 4,000 rpm
2.4L K24A (Eco) i-VTEC I4	CM3 (Wagon 24E AWD)	160 PS (118 kW) at 5,500 rpm	216 N⋅m (159 lb⋅ft) at 4,500 rpm
2.0L K20A (High Performance) i-VTEC I4	CL7 (Sedan Euro R)	220 PS (162 kW) at 8,000 rpm	206 N⋅m (152 lb⋅ft) at 6,000 rpm
2.4L K24A (High Performance) i-VTEC I4	CL9 (Sedan FWD); CM2 (Wagon 24T FWD)	200 PS (147 kW) at 6,800 rpm	232 N⋅m (171 lb⋅ft) at 4,500 rpm

Additional notes

- The K20Z2 engine replaced the K20A6 for the 2006 facelift CL7 in Europe
- The CN1 and CN2 diesel variants were only sold in Europe
- Australia and New Zealand markets only received the CL9

== Safety ==
ANCAP test results* Honda Accord Euro luxury variant (2003)
Test	Score
Overall	5 /5 stars
Frontal offset	10.44/16
Side impact	15.29/16
Pole	2/2
Seat belt reminders	0/3
Whiplash protection	Not Assessed
Pedestrian protection	Marginal
Electronic stability control	Not Assessed

== Gallery ==
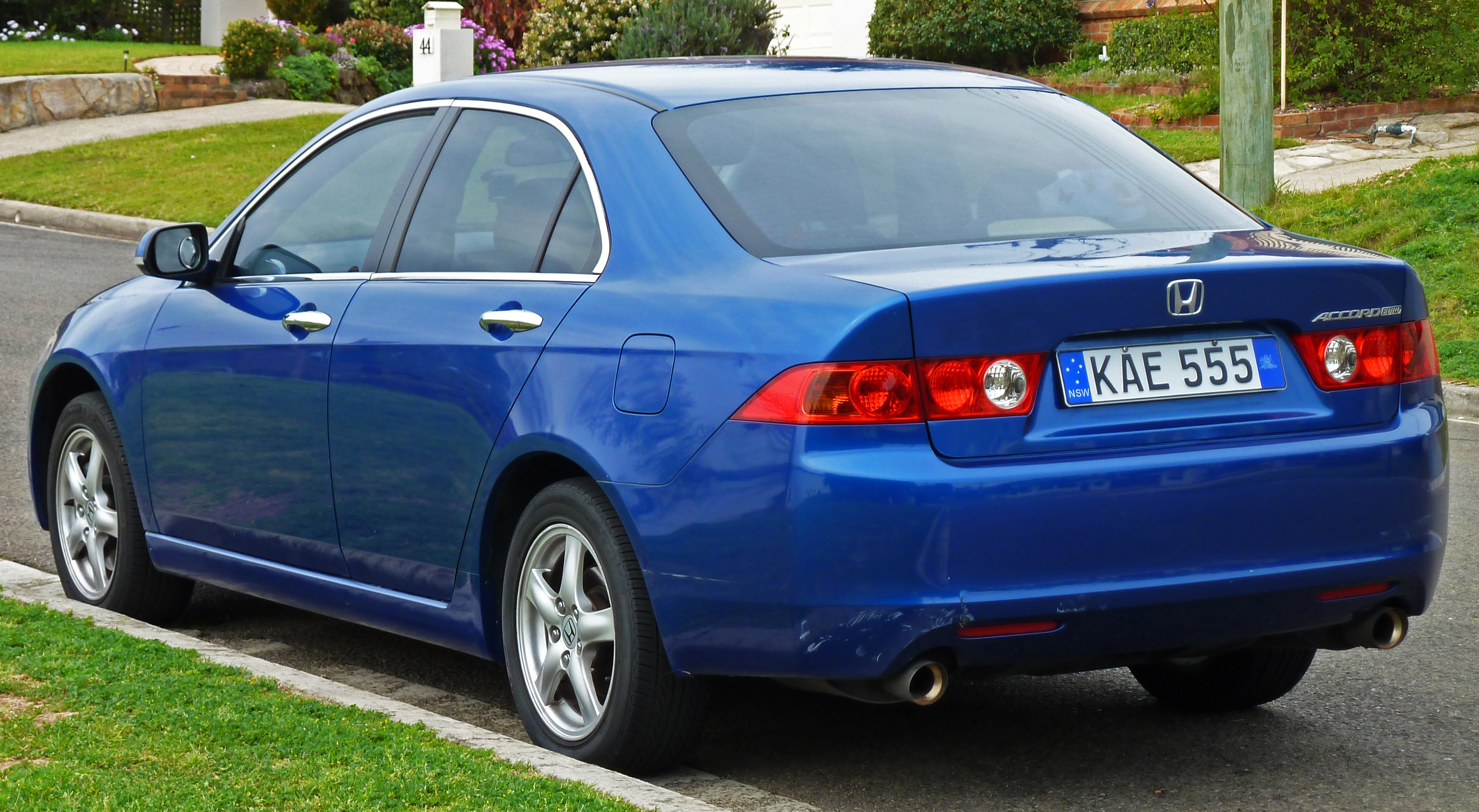
Honda Accord Euro sedan (Australia; pre-facelift)

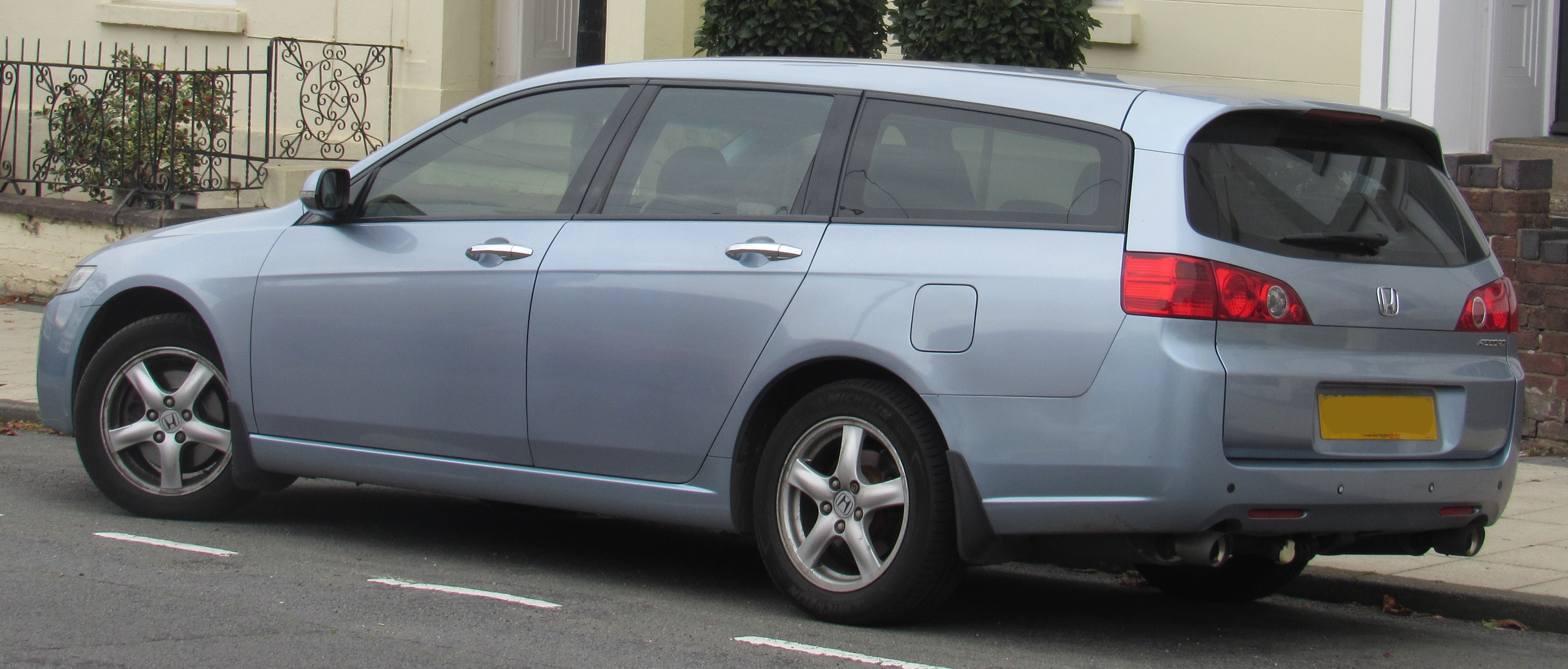
Honda Accord Tourer (Europe; pre-facelift)

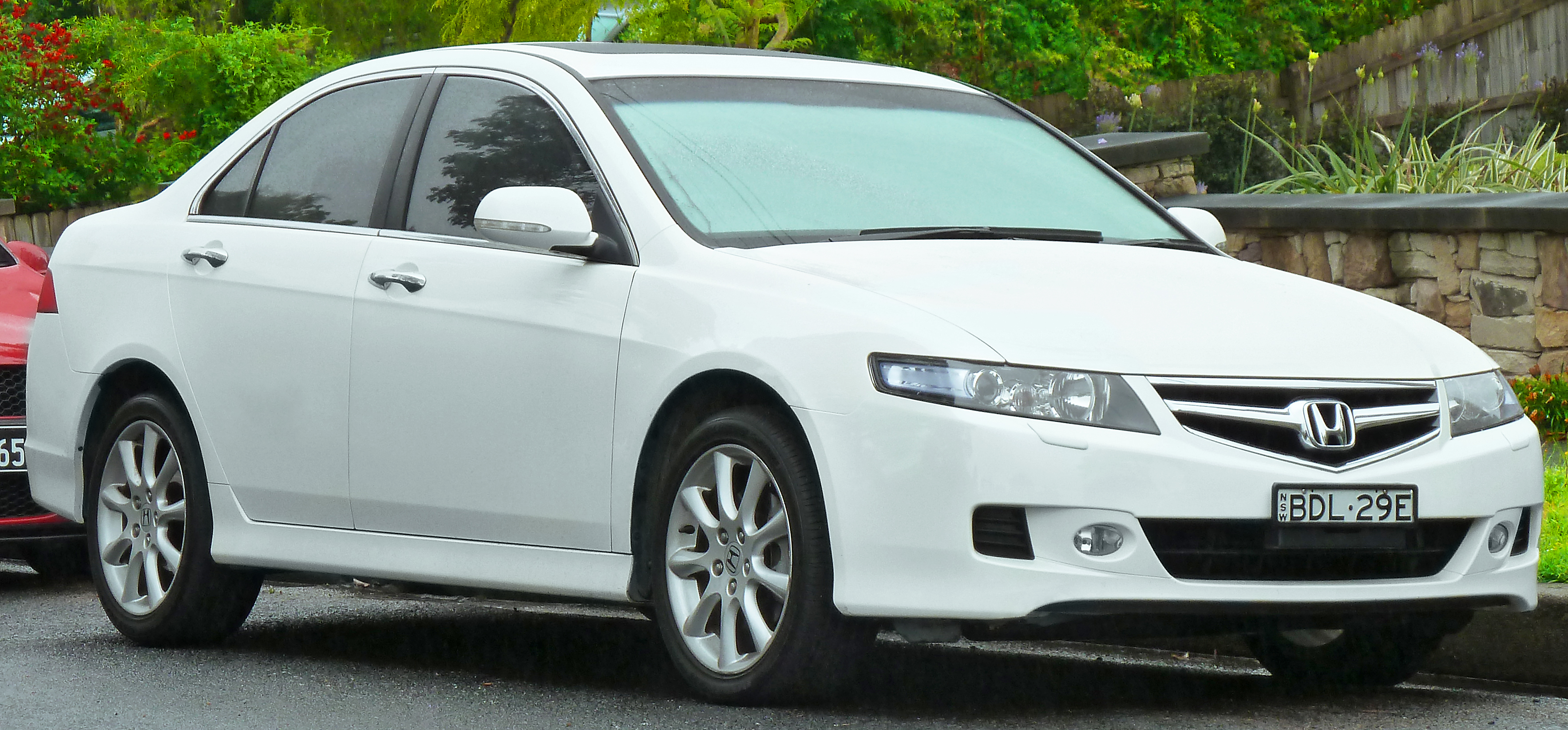
Honda Accord Euro sedan (Australia; facelift)

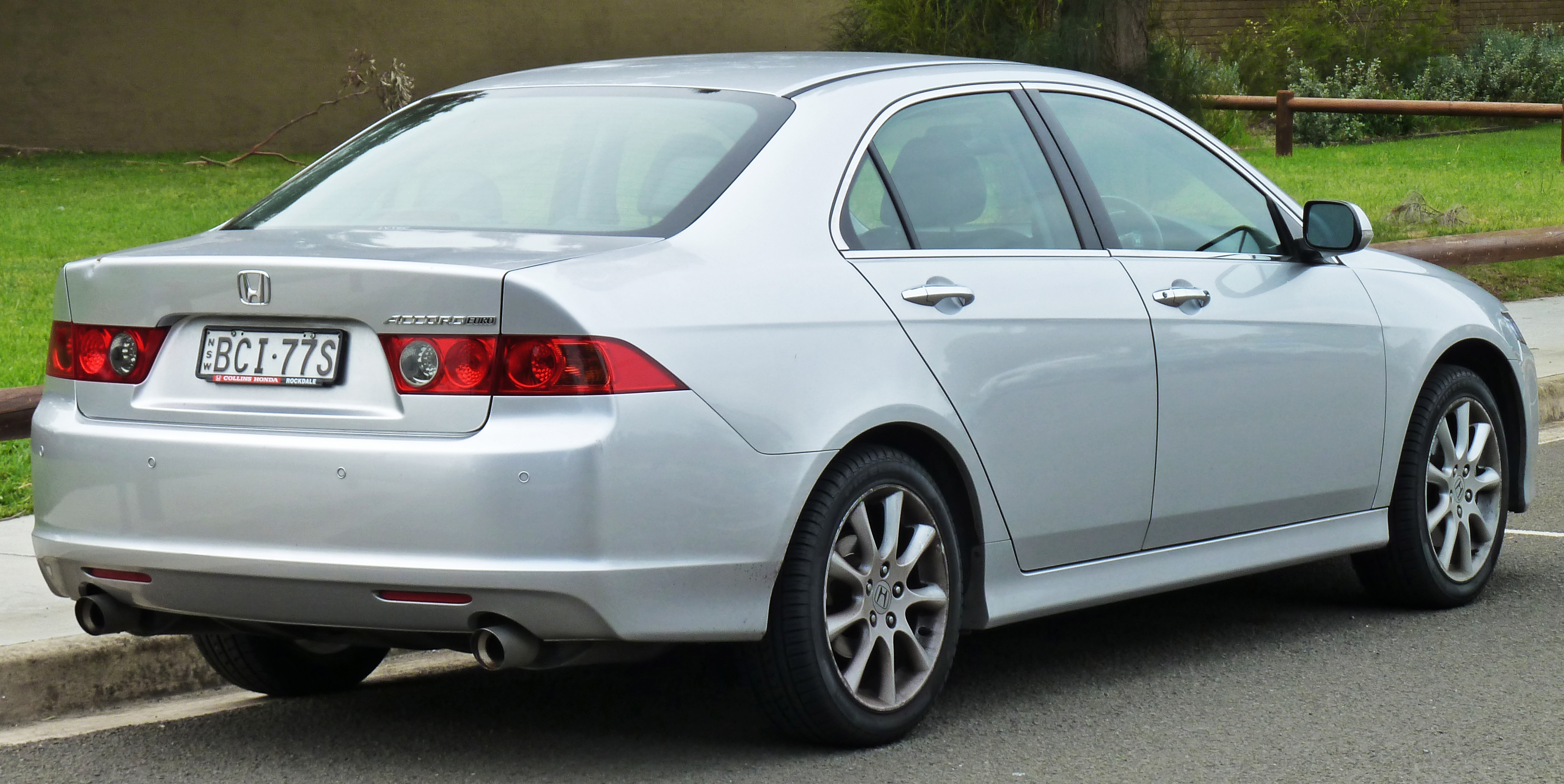
Honda Accord Euro sedan (Australia; facelift)

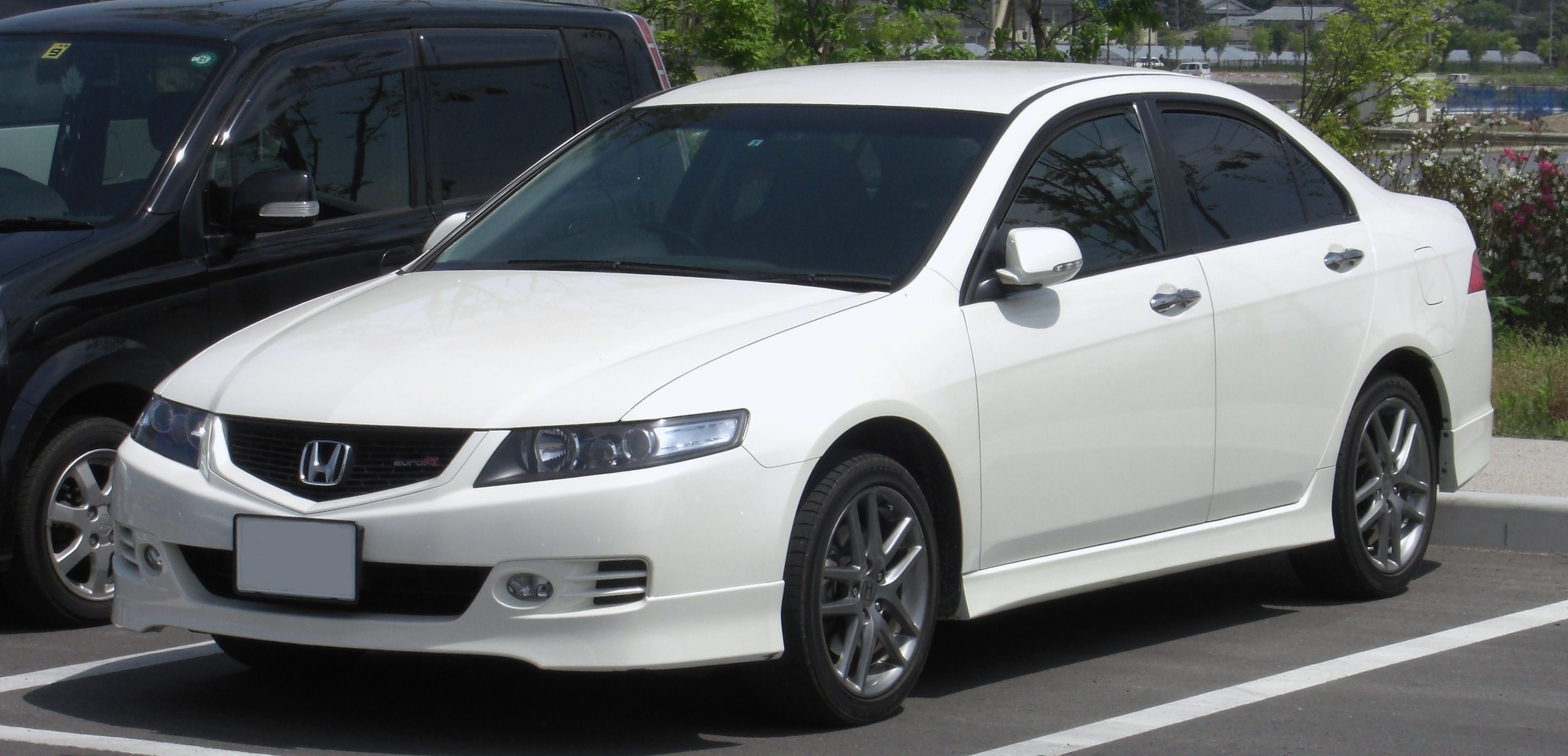
Honda Accord Euro R sedan (Japan; facelift)

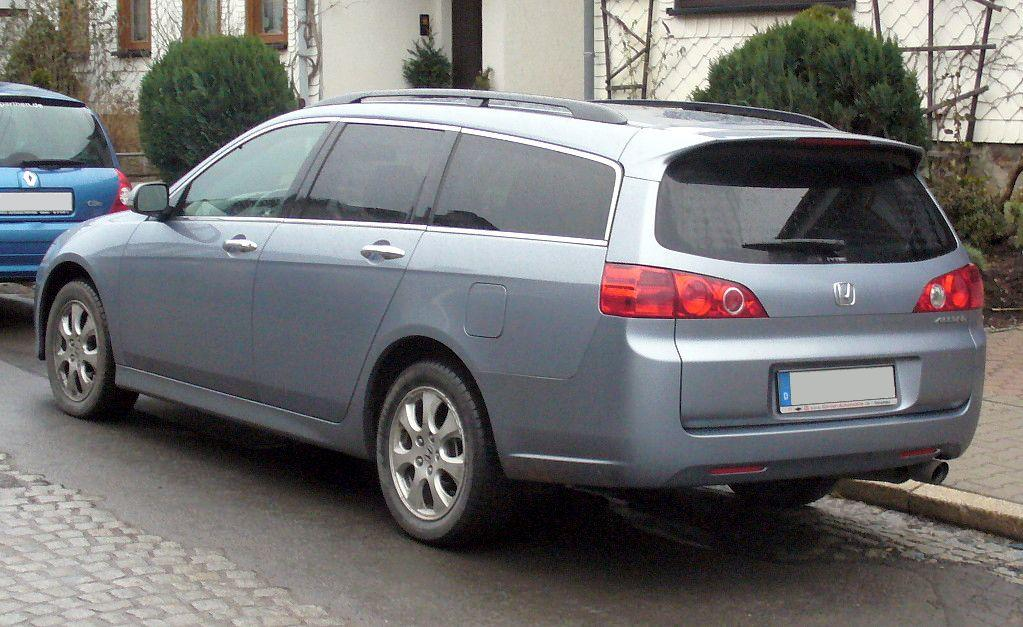
Honda Accord Tourer (Europe; facelift)

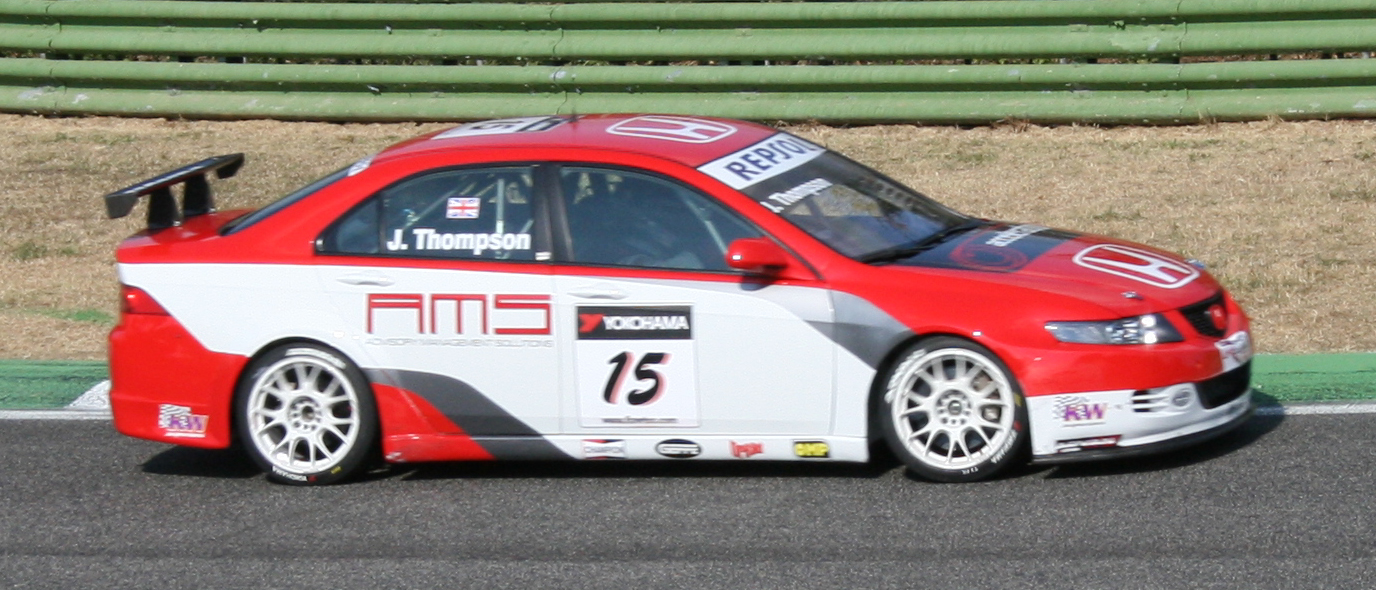
Honda Accord WTCC

== Marketing ==
The European marketing campaign was quite successful and is regarded as one of the most influential commercials of the early 2000s.
