= I-CTDi =

i-CTDi, an abbreviation for Common Rail Turbo Diesel Injection, is the common rail technology used in Honda's N22A engine, produced and sold in the Europe market between 2003 and 2008. The acronym was changed to i-DTEC in 2008, for the revised N22B engine.

== CTDi ==
The CTDi engine was a 1.7-litre Isuzu 4EE1 built by Isuzu Motors Polska and installed in the Civic for the European market.

=== Models used ===
- Honda Civic

== i-CTDi engine ==
The Honda N22A engine is Honda's first in-house developed diesel engine. The project to develop this engine had been underway since 1995 under lead engineer Kenichi Nagahiro and the first engines were released in 2003. Nagahiro's dissatisfaction with the clumsiness of older diesel engines was an inspiration to make something better. This "Hate something, change something" message became the theme of Honda's 2004 advertising campaign 'Grrr'. In 2005 the N22A was awarded the title of 'International Engine of the Year' for 2.0-2.5 l engines.

=== Models used ===
- Honda Accord
- Honda Civic
- Honda CR-V

== i-DTEC ==
=== 2.2 l (150-180 HP) ===
The Honda N22B

==== Models used ====
- Honda Civic
- Honda Accord
- Honda CR-V

=== 1.6 l (120 HP-160 HP BiTurbo) ===
==== Models used ====
- Honda Civic
- Honda HR-V
- Honda CR-V

== See also ==
- List of Honda engines
- i-VTEC
