= Honda HR-V =

Subcompact crossover SUV

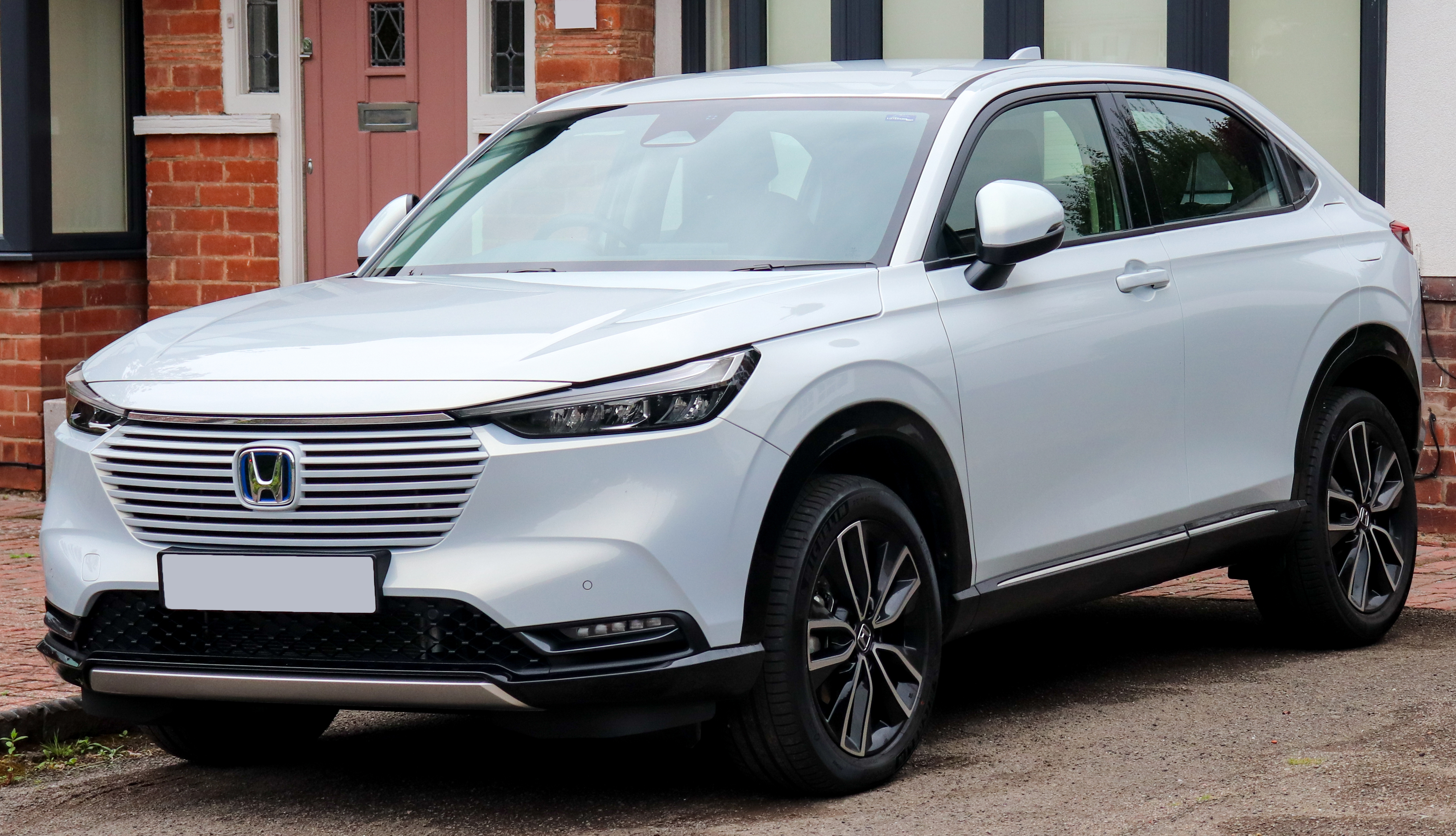
- Honda HR-V 1.5 Advance (RV5)

Overview
- Manufacturer: Honda
- Also called: Honda Vezel (Japan and China, 2013–present); Honda XR-V (China, 2014–present); Honda ZR-V (2022–present)
- Production: 1999–2006; 2013–present

Body and chassis
- Class: Subcompact crossover SUV (B)
- Layout: Front-engine, front-wheel-drive Front-engine, all-wheel-drive

The Honda HR-V is a subcompact crossover SUV (B-segment) manufactured and marketed by Honda over three generations.

The first generation HR-V, based on the Honda Logo, was marketed from 1999 to 2006 in Europe, Japan and select Asia-Pacific markets, in either three-door (1999–2003) or five-door (1999–2006) configurations — internally designated GH2 and GH4 respectively.

After a seven-year hiatus, Honda reintroduced the nameplate for the second generation HR-V, based on the third-generation Honda Fit. Production began in late 2013 for the Japanese domestic market as the Honda Vezel (Japanese: ホンダ・ヴェゼル, Hepburn: Honda Vezeru), while production started in 2015 for North America, Australia, Brazil and select Asian markets as the HR-V. Apart from Japan, the model is also sold as the Vezel in China.

For the third-generation model, the nameplate is split between two different vehicles, one for the global market (sold as the Vezel in Japan), and a larger model based on the eleventh-generation Civic destined for North America and China. The latter model is sold outside those markets as the Honda ZR-V.

According to Honda, the name "HR-V" stands for "Hi-rider Revolutionary Vehicle", while the name "Vezel" is coined from "bezel", the oblique faces of a cut gem, with the "V" for "vehicle".

== First generation (GH; 1999) ==
First generation
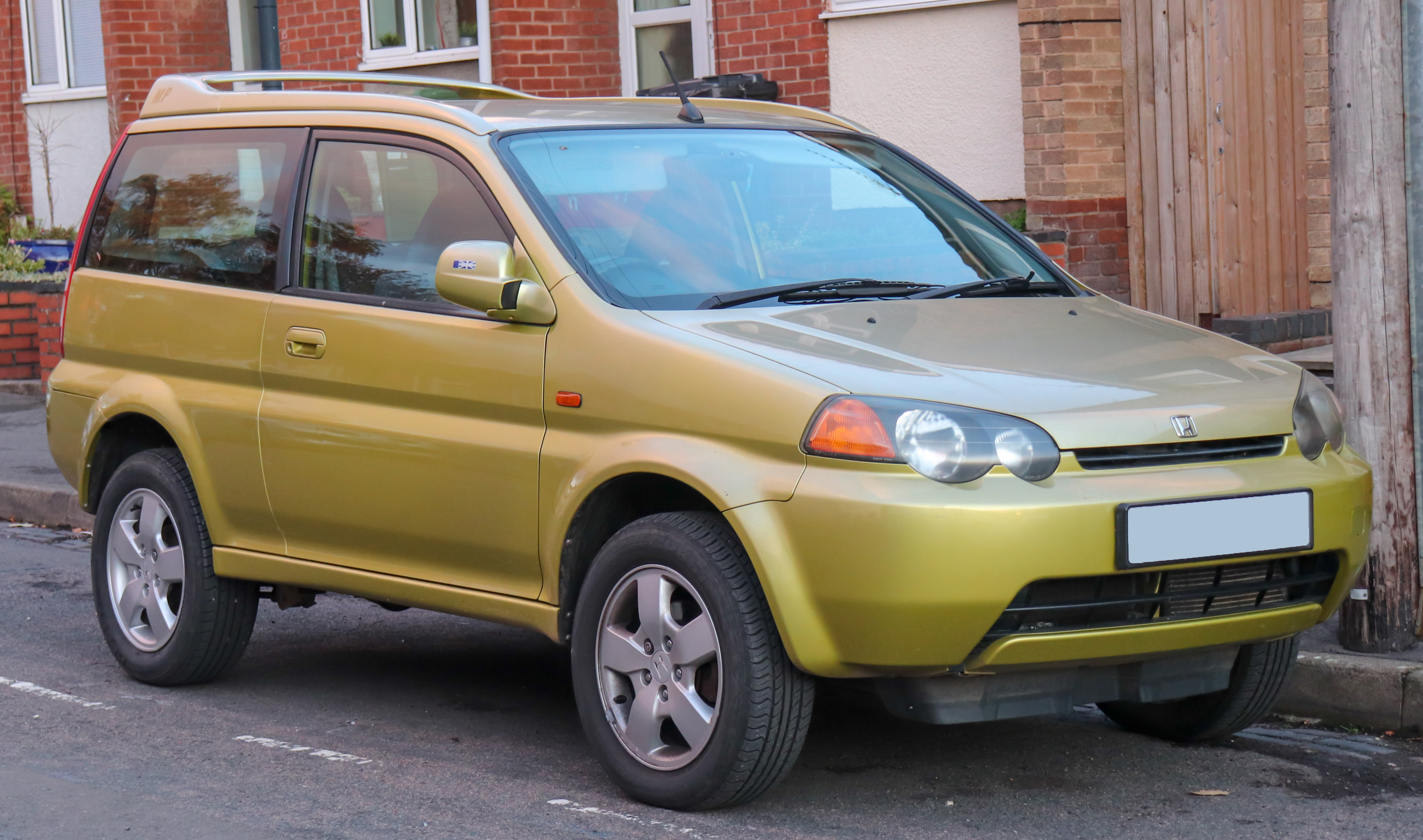
- 1999 Honda HR-V 1.6 (UK)

Overview
- Model code: GH1; GH2; GH3; GH4
- Production: 1999–2006
- Assembly: Japan: Suzuka, Mie

Body and chassis
- Class: Subcompact crossover SUV (B)
- Body style: 3-door SUV (GH1/GH2); 5-door SUV (GH3/GH4)
- Related: Honda Logo; Honda Capa

Powertrain
- Engine: Petrol: 1.6 L D16W1 SOHC I4; 1.6 L D16W5 SOHC VTEC I4
- Transmission: Honda Multimatic S 5-speed manual

Dimensions
- Wheelbase: 3-door: 2,360 mm (92.9 in); 5-door: 2,460 mm (96.9 in)
- Length: 3-door: 4,000 mm (157.5 in); 5-door: 4,110 mm (161.8 in)
- Width: 1,695 mm (66.7 in)
- Height: 1,590 mm (62.6 in)
- Curb weight: 1,200–1,300 kg (2,646–2,866 lb)

Chronology
- Successor: Honda Crossroad (second generation)

The HR-V debuted as the J-WJ concept, one of the four concepts in Honda's J-Mover Series unveiled at the 1997 Tokyo Motor Show and the 1998 Geneva Motor Show. With minimal changes from the concept, the HR-V was marketed exclusively in Japan via Honda's Verno dealership network, aimed at a young demographic. The HR-V was subsequently marketed in Europe with either a Honda D16W1 type 1.6-litre SOHC (FWD or 4WD) or a SOHC VTEC Honda D16W5 type engine (exclusively 4WD). A continuously variable transmission was optional.

The HR-V shared its platform with the Honda Logo, and was manufactured in Suzuka, Japan. When initially introduced, in February 1999, the only configuration available was a three-door body with four-wheel drive, with the internal designation GH2. In September 1999, Honda introduced a front-wheel drive variant (only with the less powerful, non-VTEC engine). Five-door models were designated GH4 and were introduced in March 2000. The standard engine was a SOHC, 1.6-litre unit with 105 PS (77 kW; 104 hp); Honda also offered a 125 PS (92 kW; 123 hp) VTEC engine option for the three- and five-door models with four-wheel drive. Neither a five-door front-wheel drive, or a front-wheel drive model with the VTEC engine were marketed.

The five-door was 110 mm longer overall, with a 100 mm longer wheelbase (2,460 mm). Suspension on all models was via MacPherson strut front suspension and a five-link De Dion-type rear suspension.

In advance of European pedestrian protection legislation, the HR-V was designed to minimize pedestrian injuries in the event of an impact. Equipment featured ABS brakes with EBD (electronic brakeforce distribution), dual SRS (supplemental restraint system) airbags, as well as folding power mirrors, power windows, folding rear seats, power steering, heat absorbing glazing, air conditioning, front fog lights and a rear spoiler with an LED centre high-mounted brake light. A 285-litre cargo area was equipped with cargo hooks, a subdivided underfloor compartment, and 50:50 split-fold rear seats. Options included body colour roof rails and a large rear roof spoiler.

The Real Time 4WD system, shared with the CR-V, uses a dual hydraulic pump rear differential where the 4WD system is hydraulically activated when the front wheels lose traction. The HR-V was noted for its low nitrous oxide emissions.

The HR-V received a gentle exterior and interior facelift in mid-2001 for the 2002 model year.

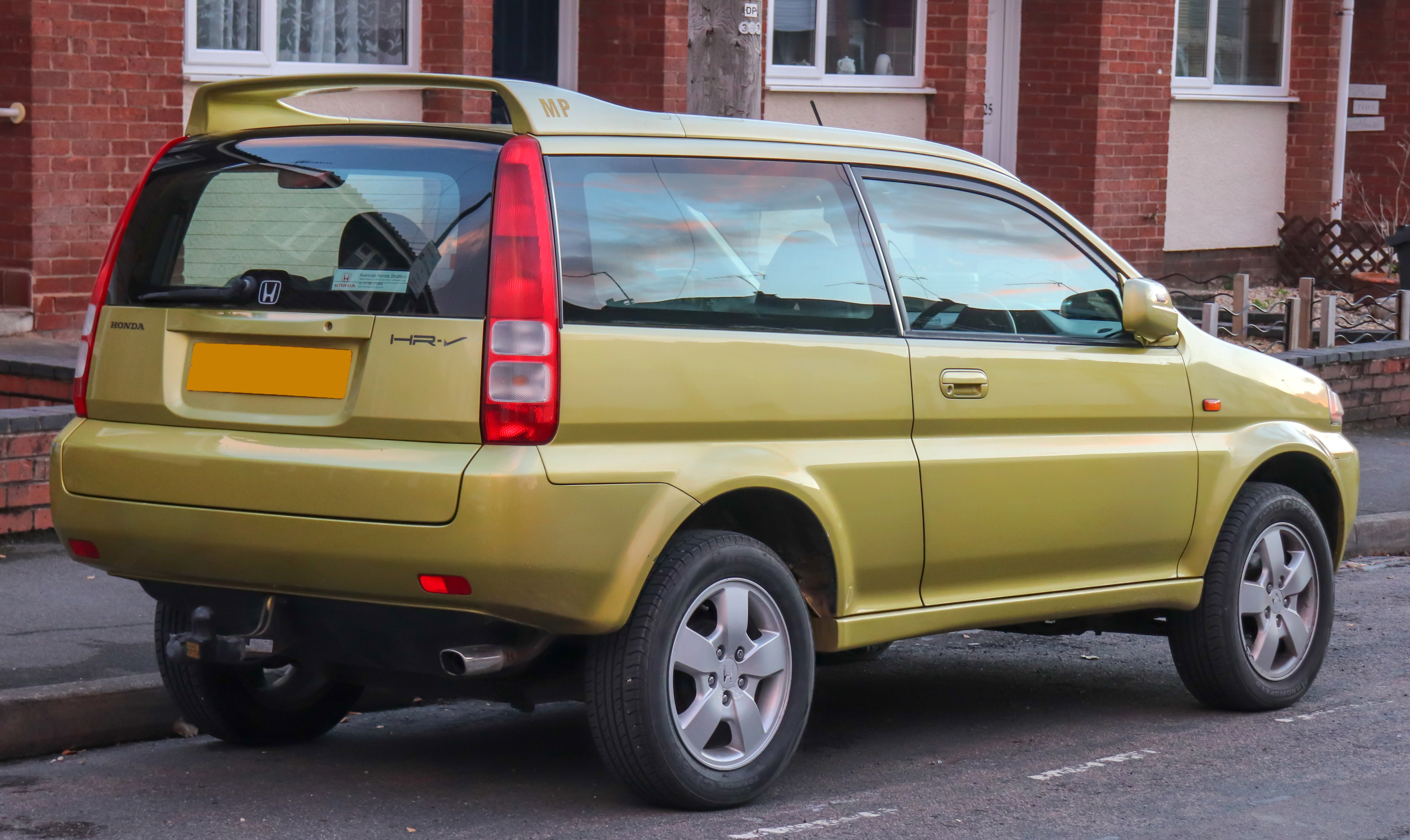
1999 Honda HR-V (3-door, pre-facelift)

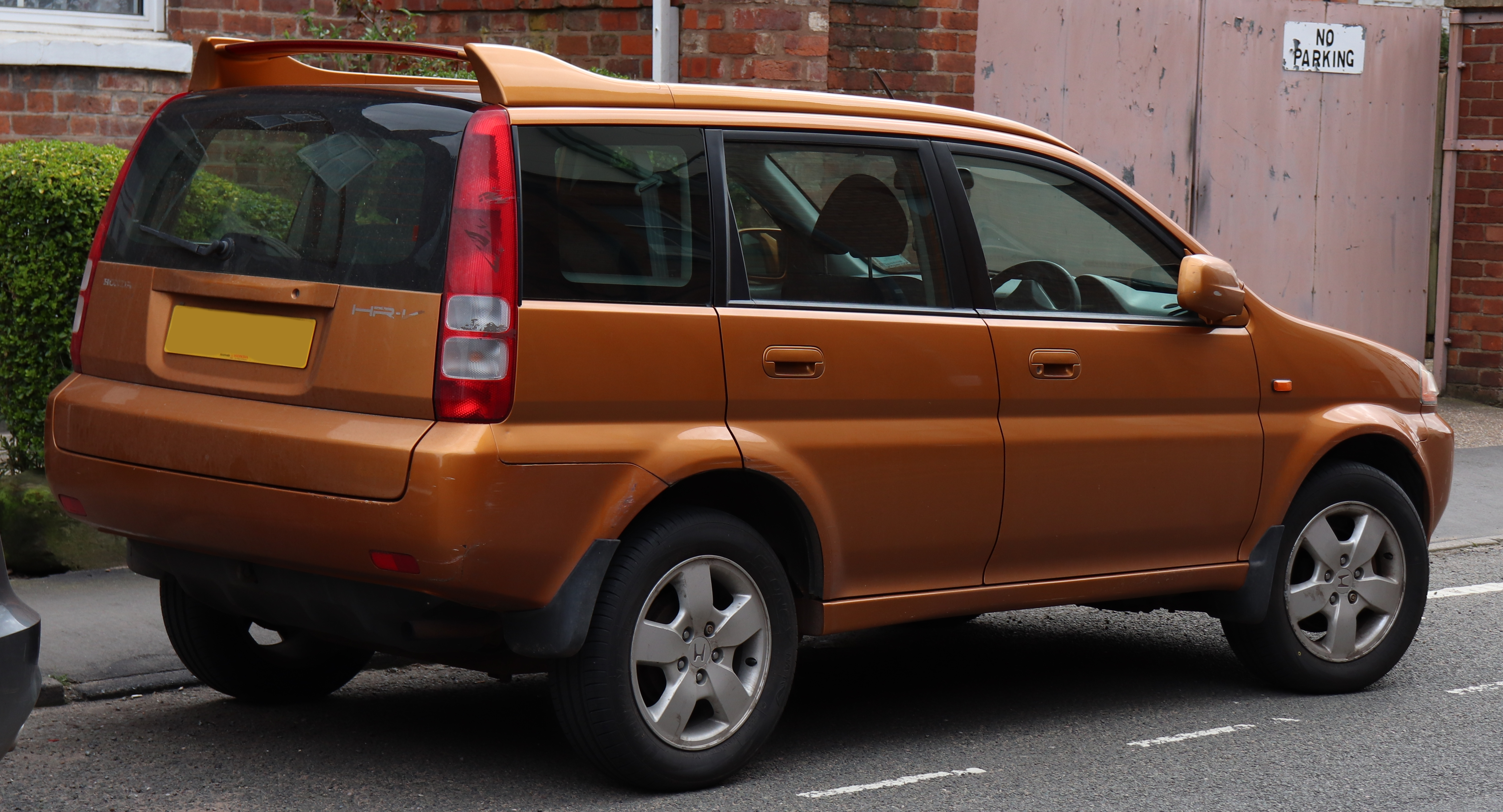
2000 Honda HR-V (5-door, pre-facelift)

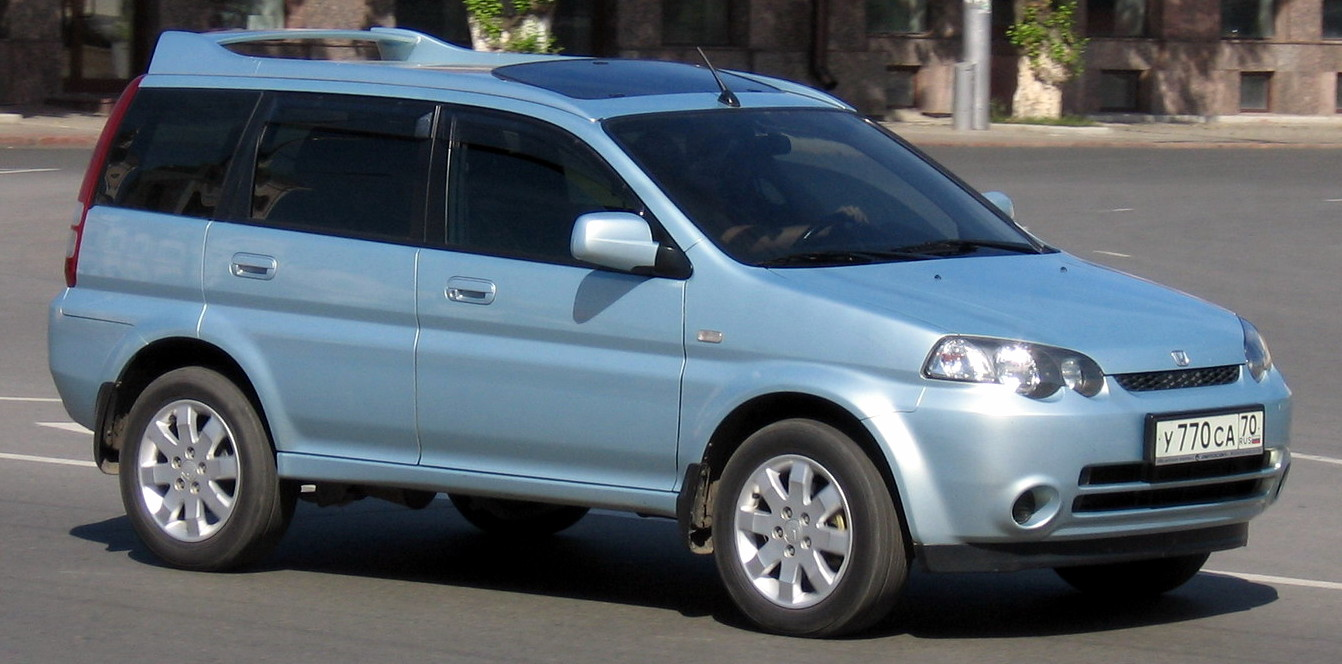
2002 Honda HR-V (5-door, facelift)

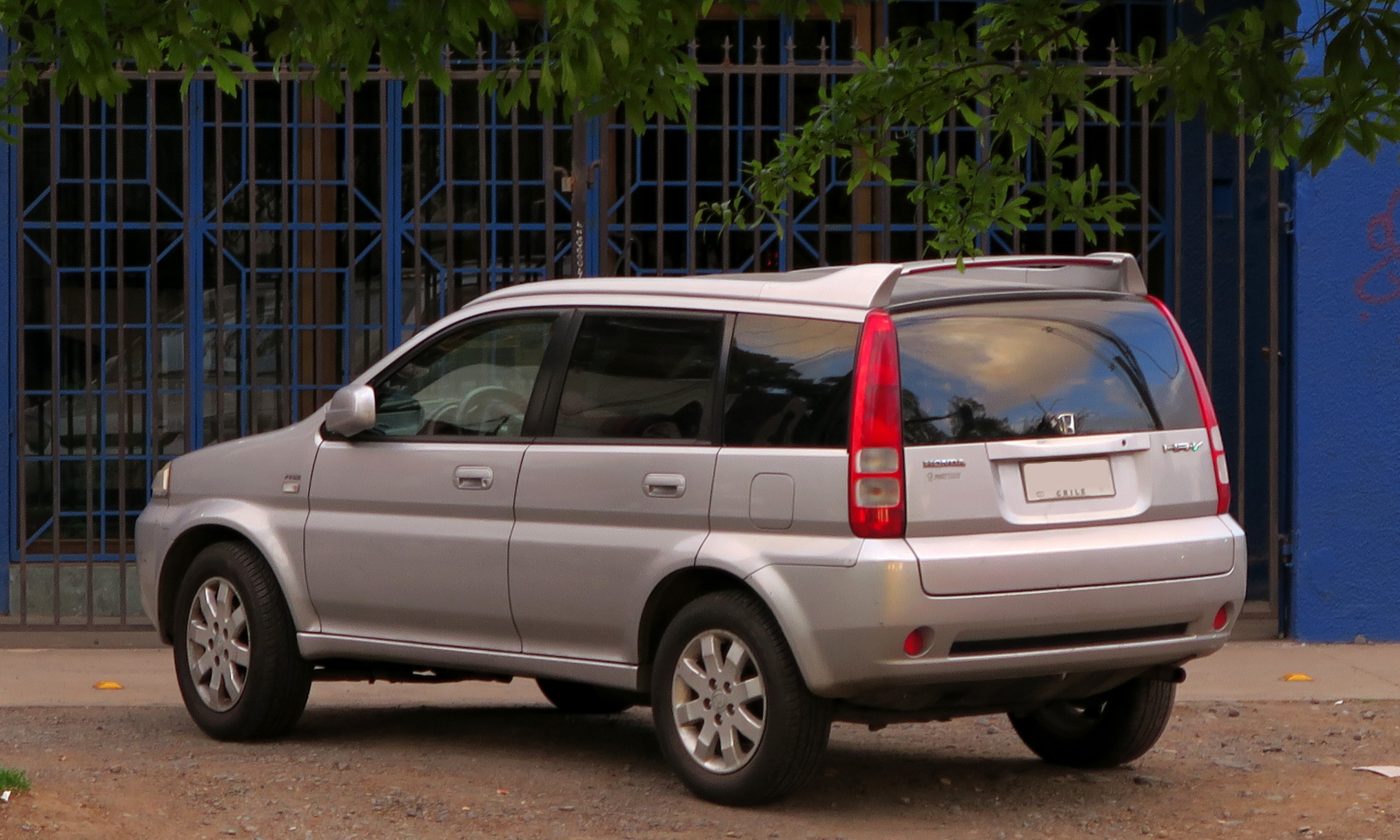
2003 Honda HR-V (5-door, facelift)

=== Engines ===
Petrol engines
Model	Engine	Displacement	Power	Torque	Transmissions
1.6	D16W1; D16W2	1,590 cc (1.6 L) I4	77 kW (105 PS; 103 hp) at 6,200 rpm	138 N⋅m (102 lb⋅ft) at 3,400 rpm	5-speed manual CVT
1.6 VTEC	D16W5	1,590 cc (1.6 L) I4	92 kW (125 PS; 123 hp) at 6,700 rpm	142 N⋅m (105 lb⋅ft) at 4,900 rpm	5-speed manual CVT

== Second generation (RU; 2013) ==
Second generation
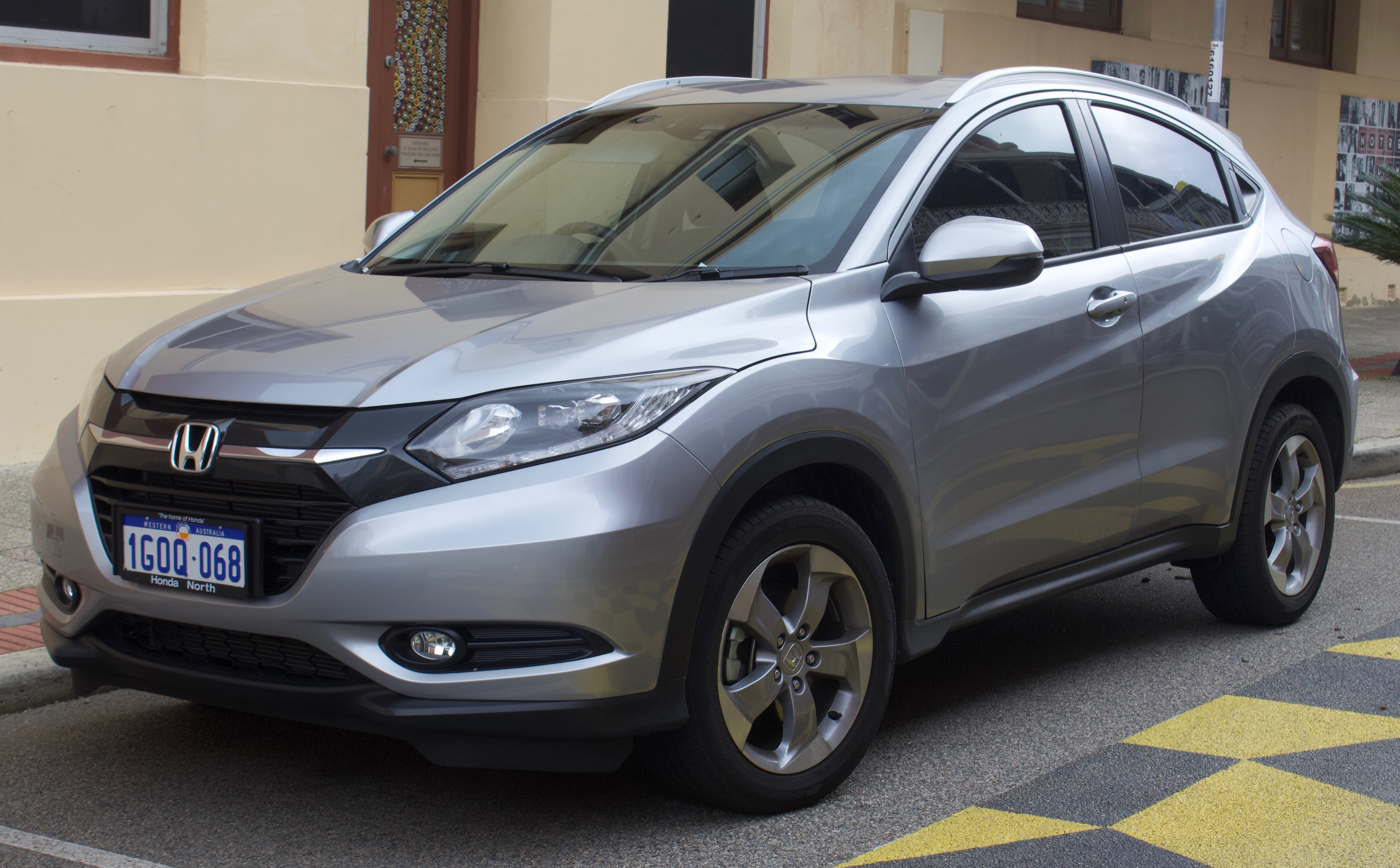
- Pre-facelift Honda HR-V

Overview
- Model code: RU1; RU2; RU3; RU4; RU5
- Also called: Honda Vezel (Japan and China); Honda XR-V (China); Ciimo X-NV/M-NV (China, electric); Everus VE-1 (China, electric)
- Production: December 2013 – 2022
- Model years: 2016–2022
- Assembly: Japan: Yorii, Saitama; Mexico: Celaya; Guanajuato; El Salto, Jalisco; Brazil: Sumaré; Argentina: Campana, Buenos Aires; China: Guangzhou (Guangqi Honda, Vezel); Wuhan (Dongfeng Honda, XR-V); Indonesia: Karawang (HPM); Malaysia: Alor Gajah, Malacca; Thailand: Ayutthaya; Taiwan: Pingtung; Nigeria: Lagos
- Designer: Masaki Kobayashi; Daisuke Toriyama (XR-V)

Body and chassis
- Class: Subcompact crossover SUV (B)
- Body style: 5-door SUV
- Platform: Honda Global Small Car
- Related: Honda Fit/Jazz (third generation); Honda WR-V (first generation); Honda City/Ballade (sixth generation); Honda Freed (second generation); Acura CDX

Powertrain
- Engine: Petrol: 1.5 L L15Z DOHC i-VTEC I4; 1.5 L L15B DOHC i-VTEC I4; 1.5 L L15BP/L15BS DOHC VTC I4 turbo; 1.5 L L15BY DOHC VTC I4 turbo; 1.8 L R18Z9 SOHC i-VTEC I4; Diesel: 1.6 L N16A DOHC i-DTEC I4 Common rail turbo-diesel; Petrol hybrid: 1.5 L LEB Atkinson cycle i-DCD I4
- Electric motor: Honda H1 AC PMSM (hybrid)
- Transmission: 6-speed manual CVT; 7-speed DCT (hybrid)
- Hybrid drivetrain: Sport Hybrid i-DCD (Vezel/HR-V Hybrid)

Dimensions
- Wheelbase: 2,610 mm (102.8 in)
- Length: 4,295–4,335 mm (169.1–170.7 in)
- Width: 1,770 mm (69.7 in)
- Height: 1,605–1,610 mm (63.2–63.4 in)
- Curb weight: 1,180–1,270 kg (2,601–2,800 lb)

The second generation HR-V was previewed as the Urban SUV Concept which was unveiled at the 2013 North American International Auto Show. The concept version was said to be based on Honda's Global Compact Series, which includes the Honda Fit subcompact and the Honda City subcompact sedan.

The vehicle was unveiled in November 2013 at the Tokyo Motor Show as the Vezel. Based on the Honda Fit platform, at the time of its introduction it was the smallest SUV from Honda, below the CR-V. The exterior design of the crossover is inspired by coupés with its sloping roof, and a unique design element like hidden rear door handles.

In terms of practicality, at its release in Europe, Honda claimed the HR-V offers 453 L (16.0 cu ft) of boot space with the rear seats up and 1,026 L (36.2 cu ft) with the rear seats down. While in the North America, the HR-V is said to have 24.3 cu ft (690 L) with the rear seats up, and 58.8 cu ft (1,670 L) with the rear seats folded. Honda has described its cabin as "exceptionally versatile," due to the inclusion the Magic Seats system carried over from the Fit which enables the lower part of the rear seat to be folded up to carry tall items.

The HR-V's body uses 27% ultra-high-strength steel grades, of either of 780, 980 or 1,500 MPa yield strength.

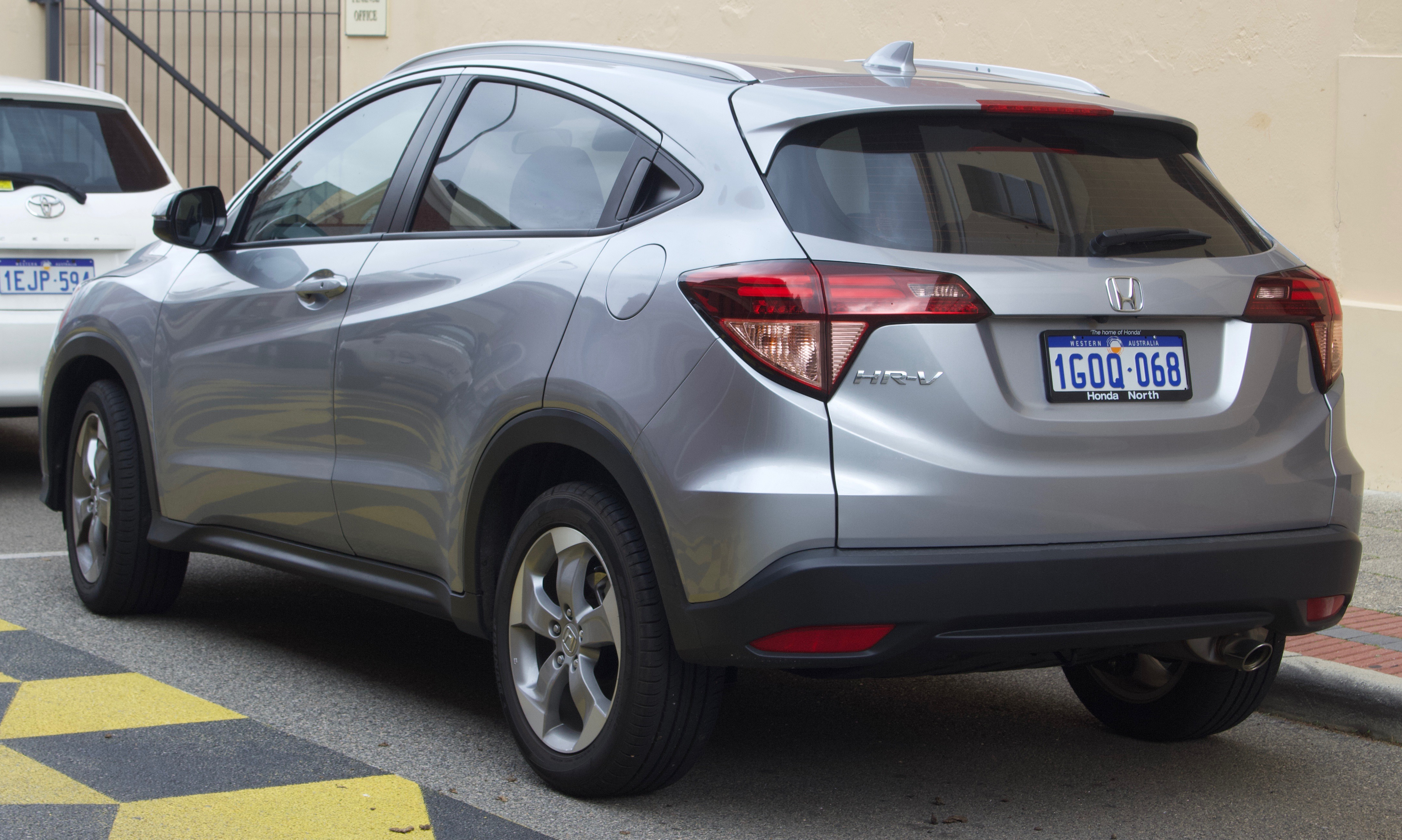
Rear view (pre-facelift)

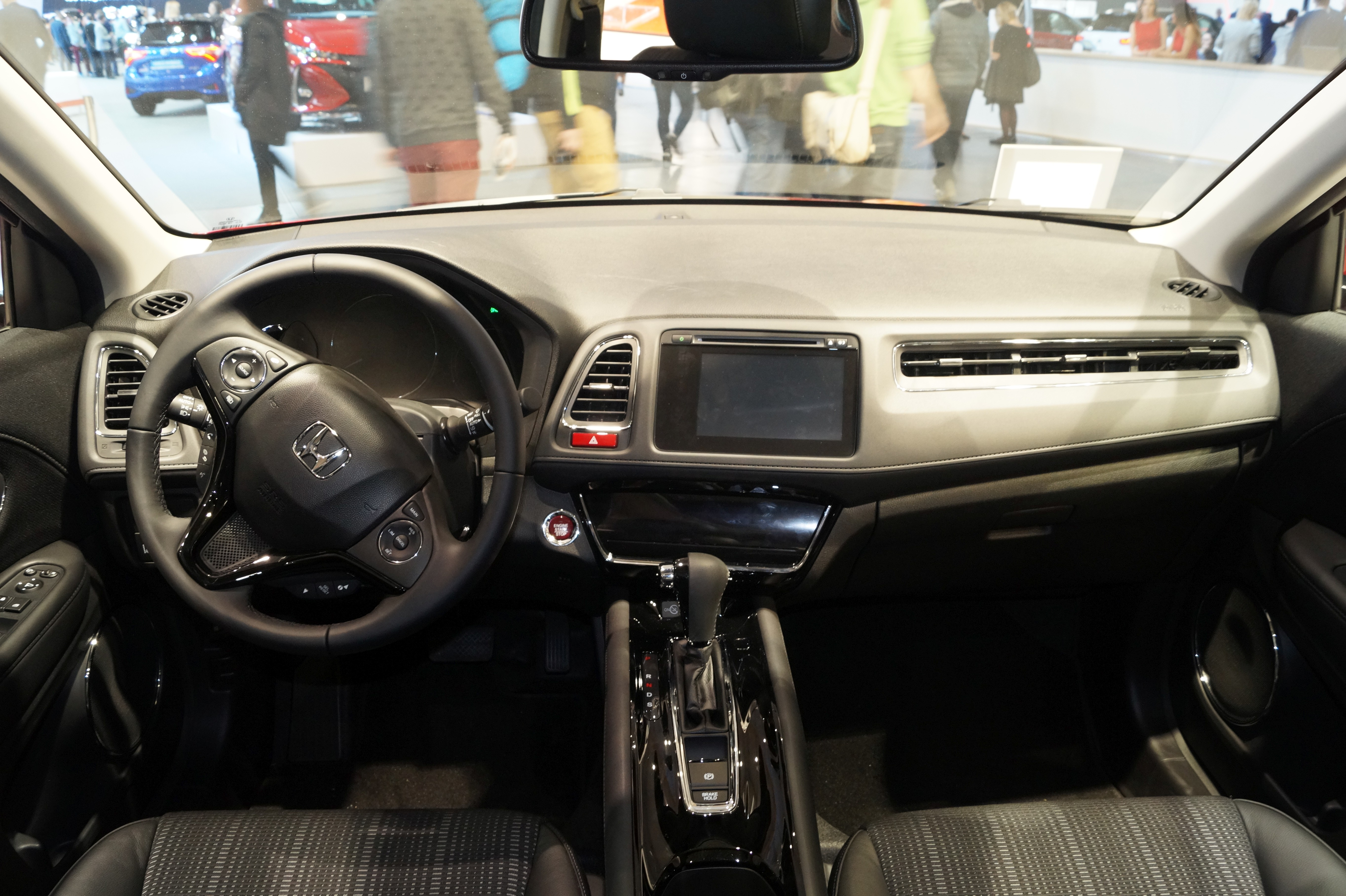
Interior

=== Facelift ===
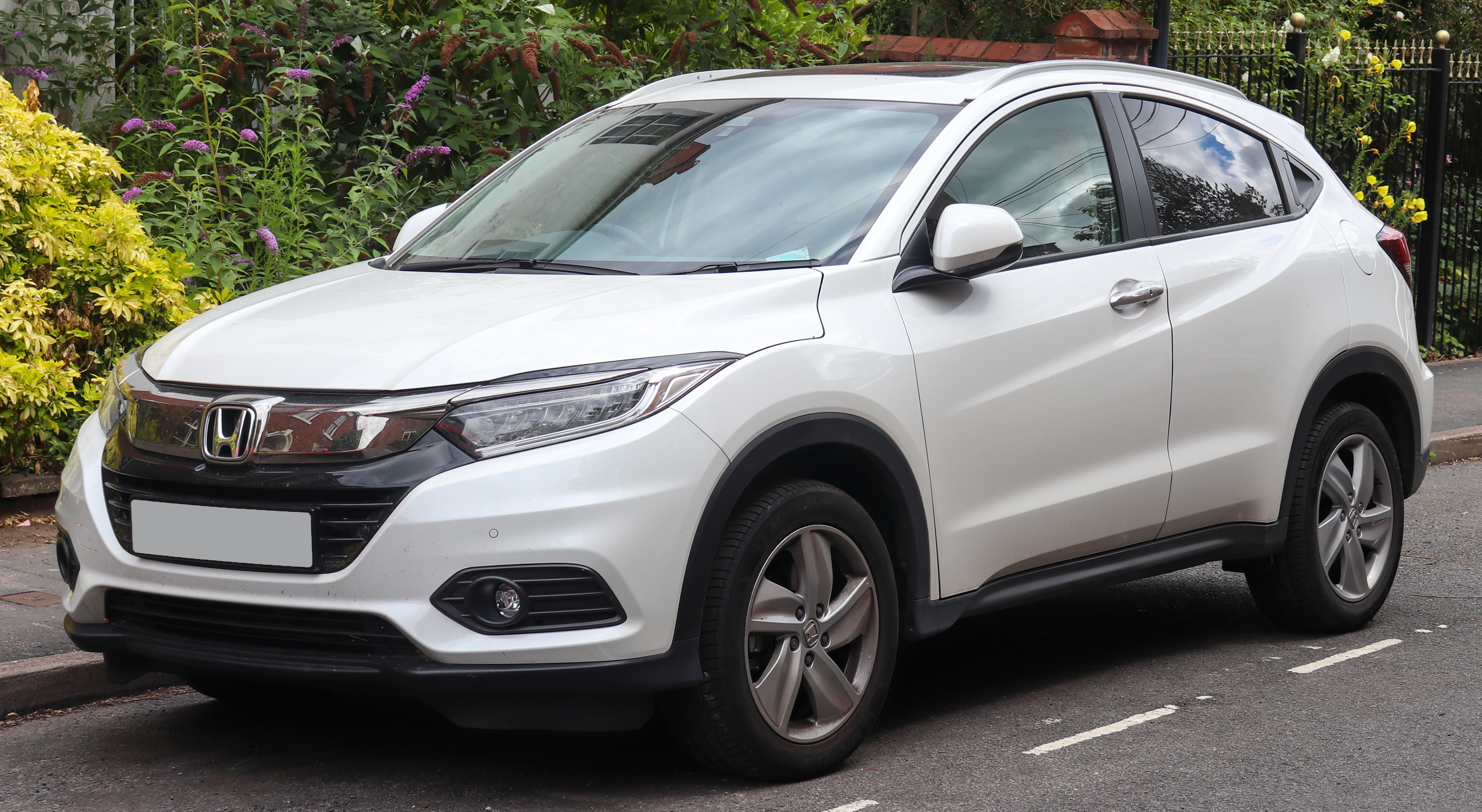
2019 Honda HR-V 1.5 EX (RU1; facelift, UK)

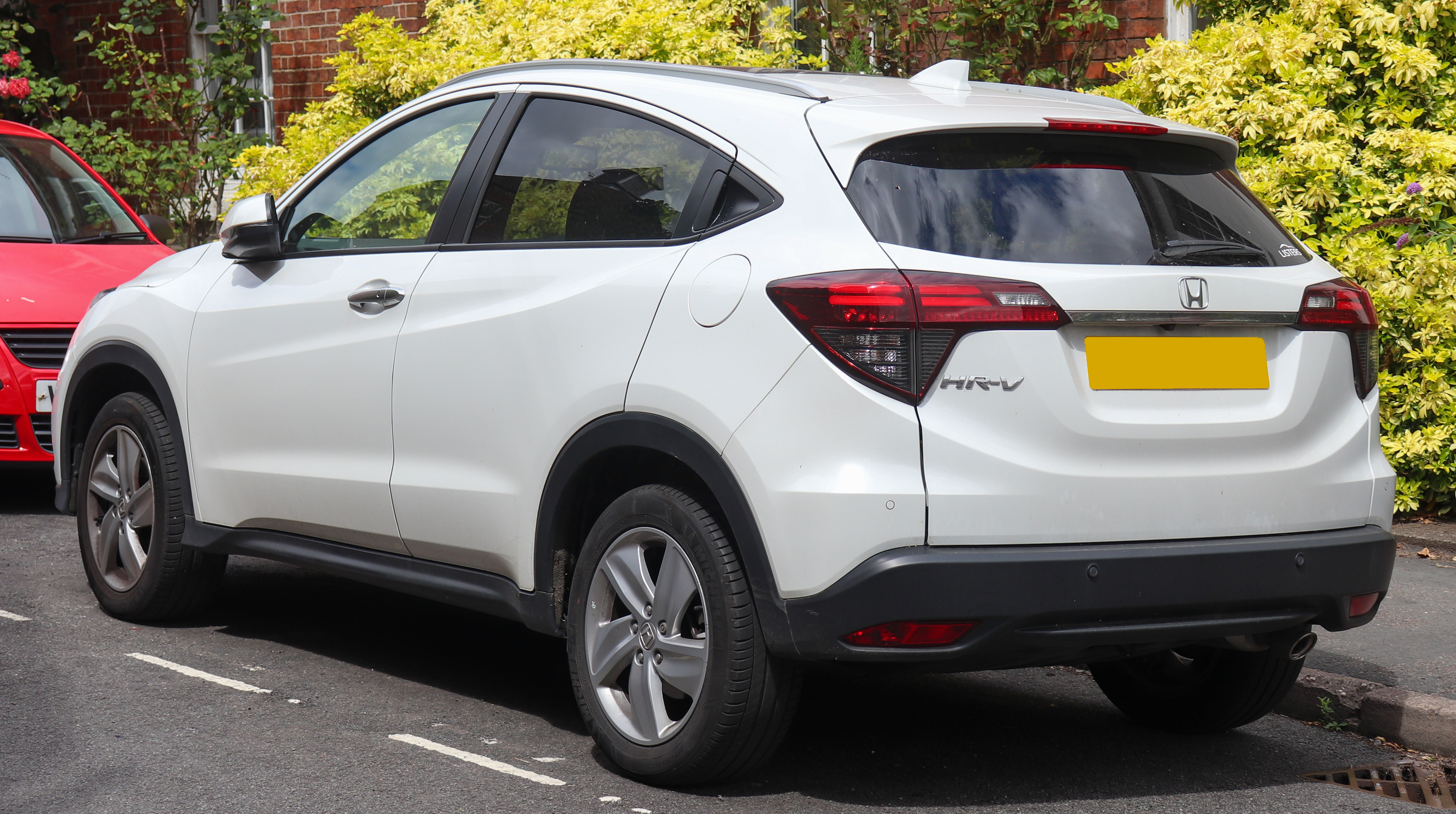
2019 Honda HR-V 1.5 EX (RU1; facelift, UK)

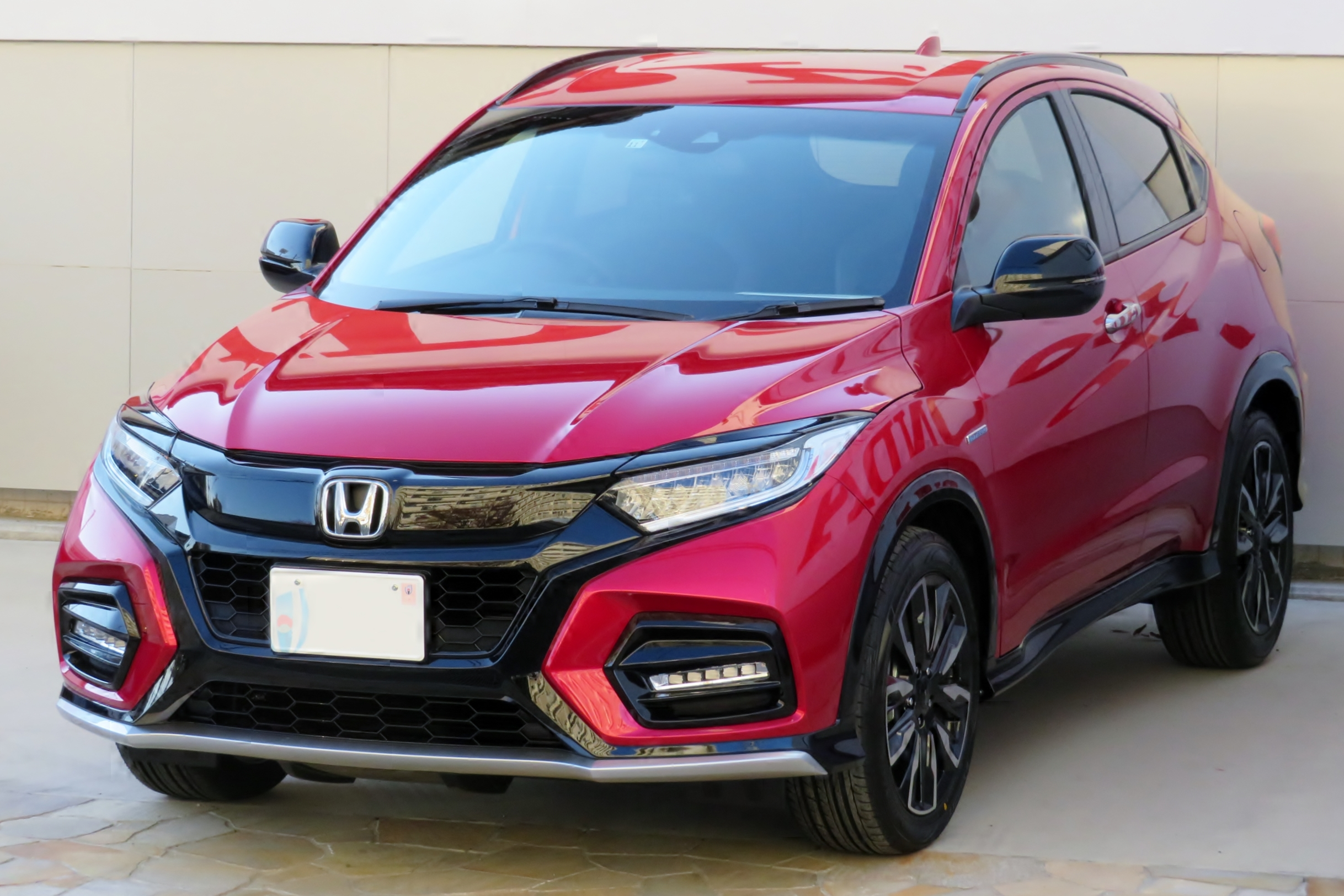
Honda Vezel Hybrid with Modulo body kit (facelift, Japan)

=== Markets ===
==== Brazil ====
The Brazil-market HR-V, assembled locally at Honda's plant in the state of São Paulo and also imported from Argentina, went on sale in first-quarter 2015 as a 2016 model. For the first nine months of 2015, Honda's production in Brazil was reported to increase by 20 percent as a result of the launch of HR-V compared with a 20% drop for the industry.

On 21 May 2020, the last HR-V rolled out the assembly line of the Argentinian plant, marking the closure of the plant. This means Brazil is the only producer of the HR-V in South America.

==== China ====
In China, the vehicle is manufactured and marketed by two separate joint ventures with different names and cosmetic changes. Guangqi Honda revealed the vehicle with the Vezel nameplate in October 2014. It is mostly identical with the global model. Inside, the dual-tone interior features black and orange finish instead of a full grey theme.

In November 2014, Dongfeng Honda released its own version called the Honda XR-V. Previewed by the XR-V Concept in September 2014, it features a redesigned front and rear fascia and door panel sheet metals as it is positioned as a more aggressive looking vehicle. In the rear end, the taillights have been replaced with narrower, LED lights that span the entire width of the rear end. The interior is slightly different from the Vezel with the horizontal HVAC vents replaced by round vents. Both the Vezel and XR-V are powered with a 1.5-litre or 1.8-litre i-VTEC petrol engines.

Honda revealed the facelifted XR-V in February 2020 featuring an updated front fascia and rear bumper. The engine options of the facelift model includes a 1.5-litre VTEC Turbo engine and a 1.5-litre i-VTEC naturally aspirated engine.

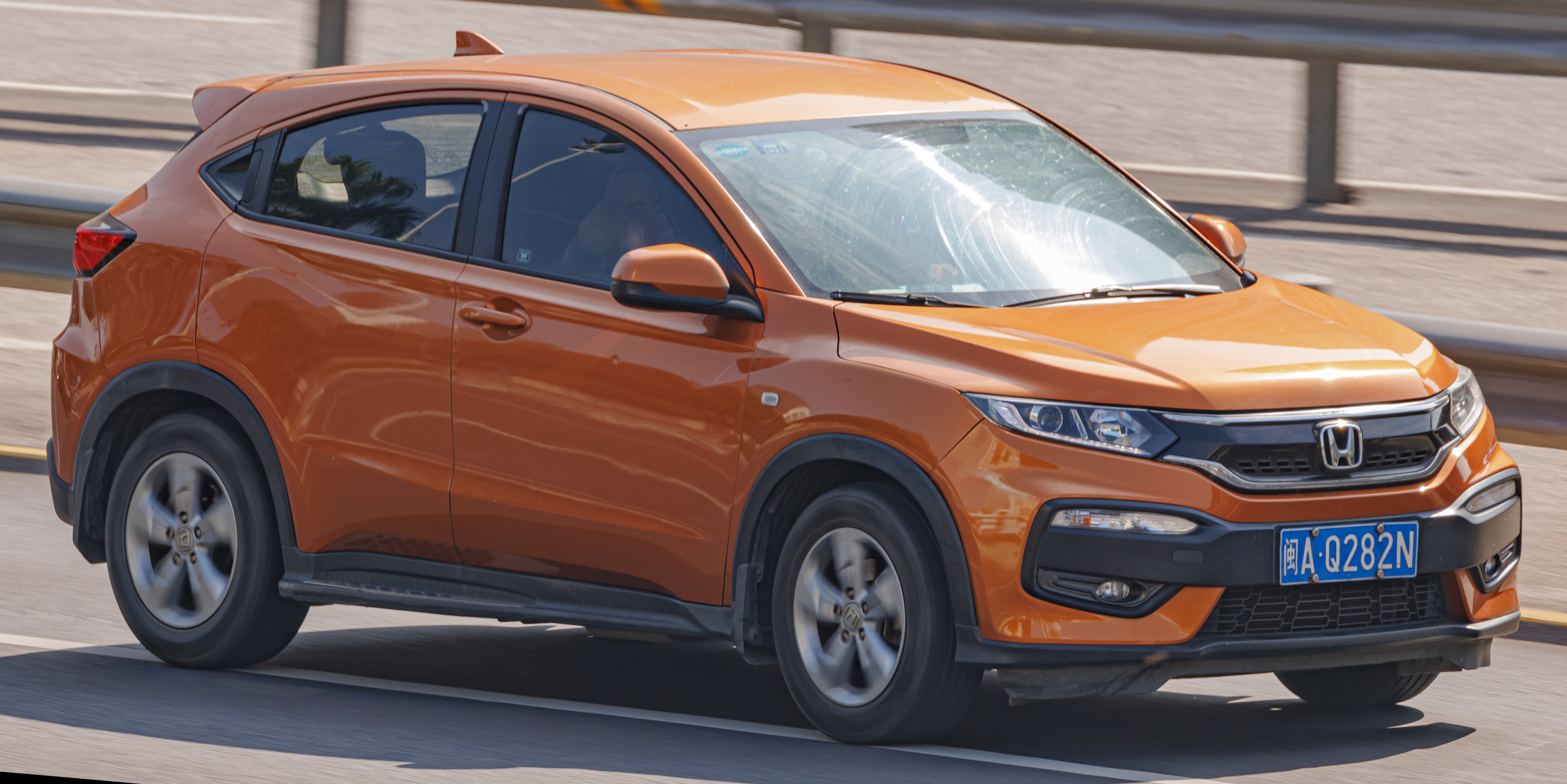
2015 Honda XR-V (pre-facelift)

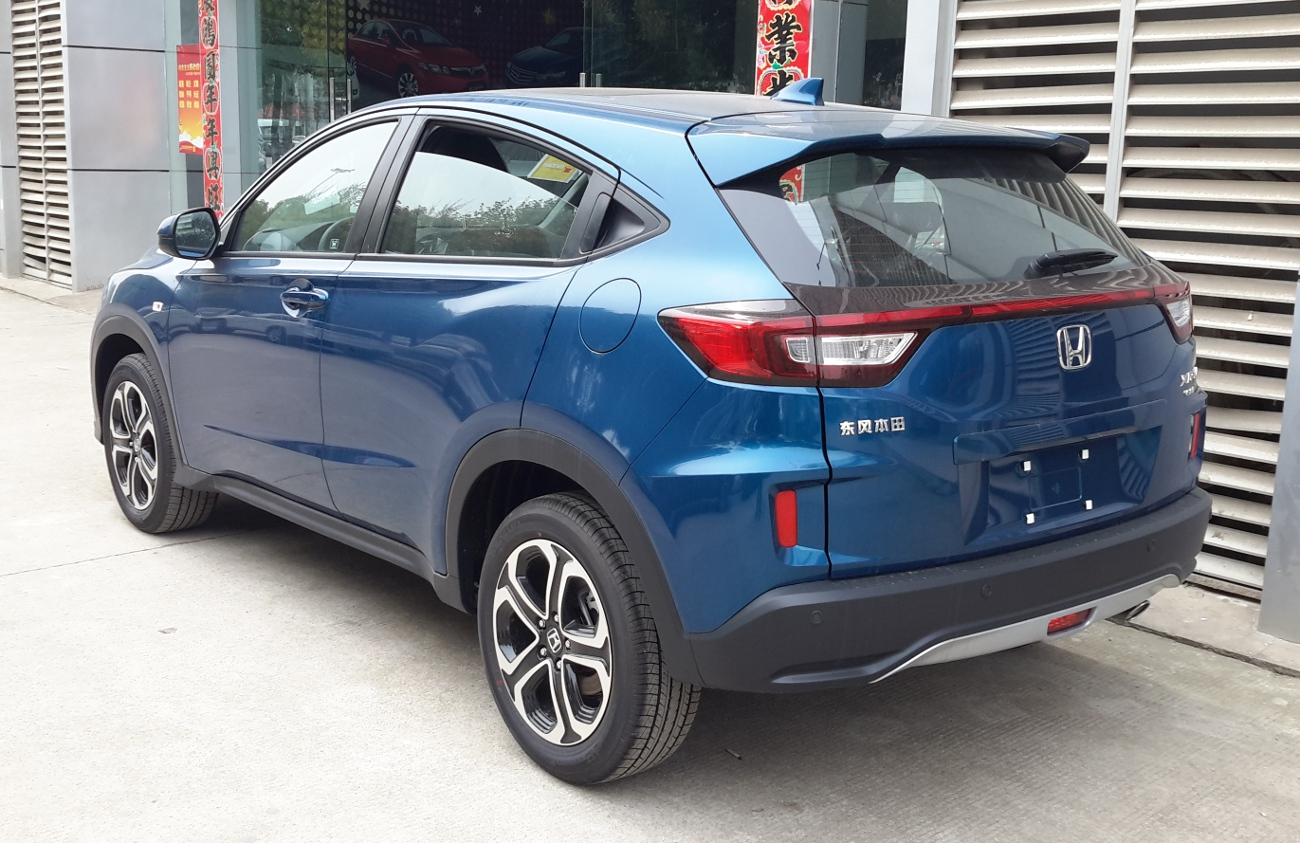
2015 Honda XR-V (pre-facelift)

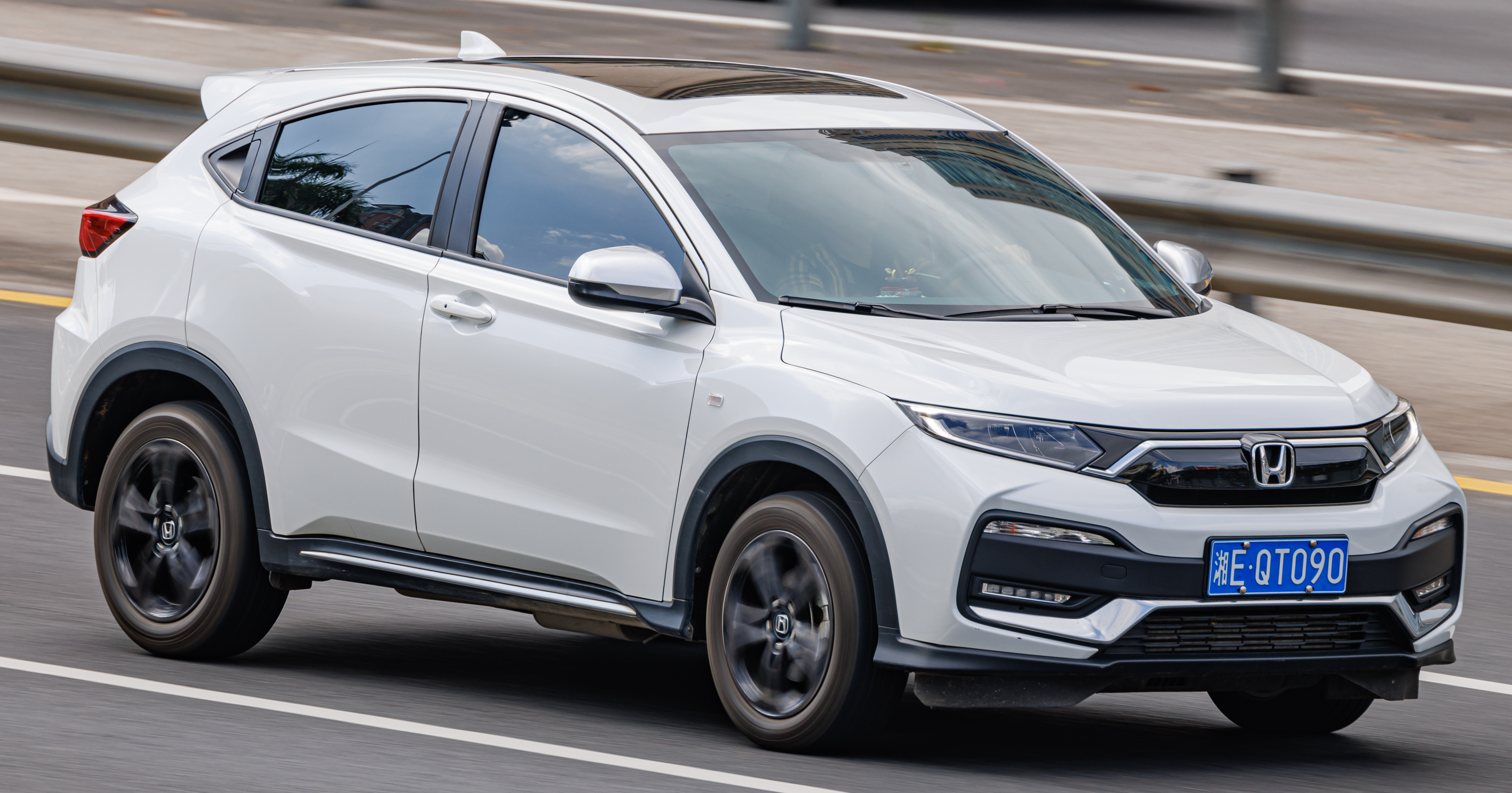
Honda XR-V (facelift)

===== Electric versions =====
The first battery electric version of the Honda Vezel was marketed by Guangqi Honda as the Everus VE-1 in China, based on the Everus EV concept. The production model debuted in November 2019. The electric version of the Honda XR-V was marketed by Dongfeng Honda as the Ciimo X-NV, based on the X-NV Concept. Production began in October 2019. Another electric version released by Dongfeng Honda is the Ciimo M-NV which was revealed in November 2020 which sports a new front and rear fascia design, and a completely redesigned interior with a 12.3-inch TFT instrument cluster and push-button gear selector.

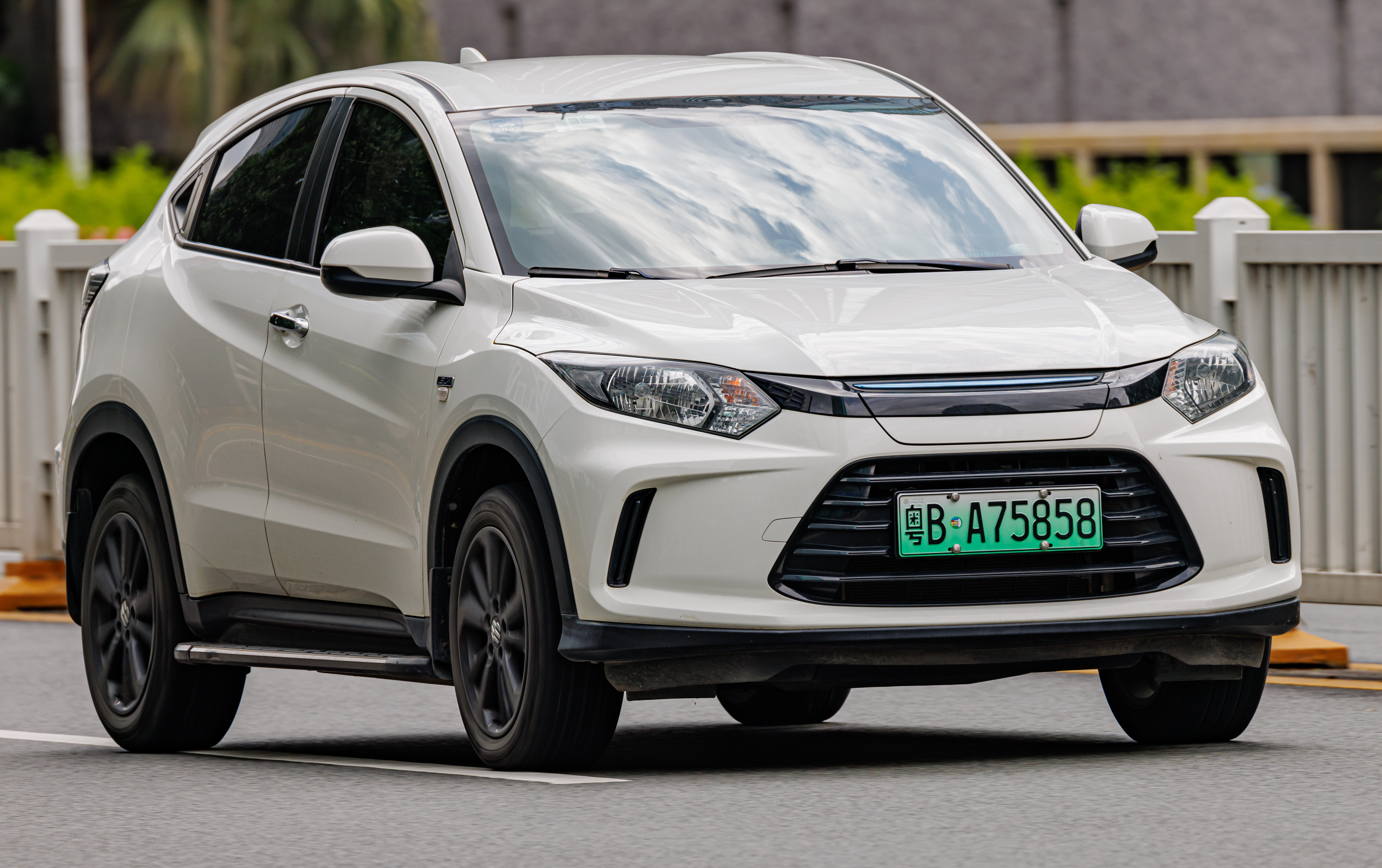
Everus VE-1 (pre-facelift)

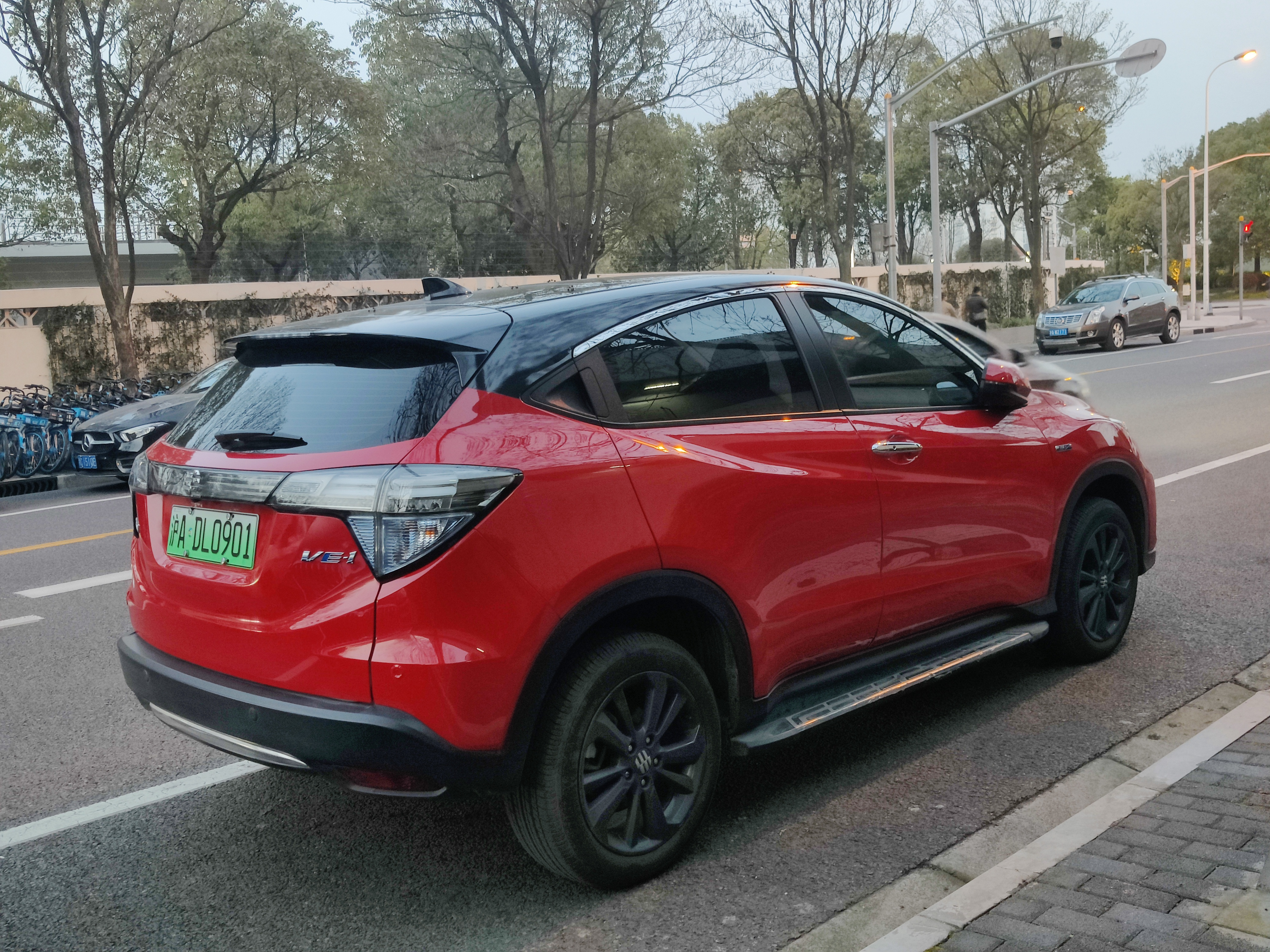
Everus VE-1 (pre-facelift)

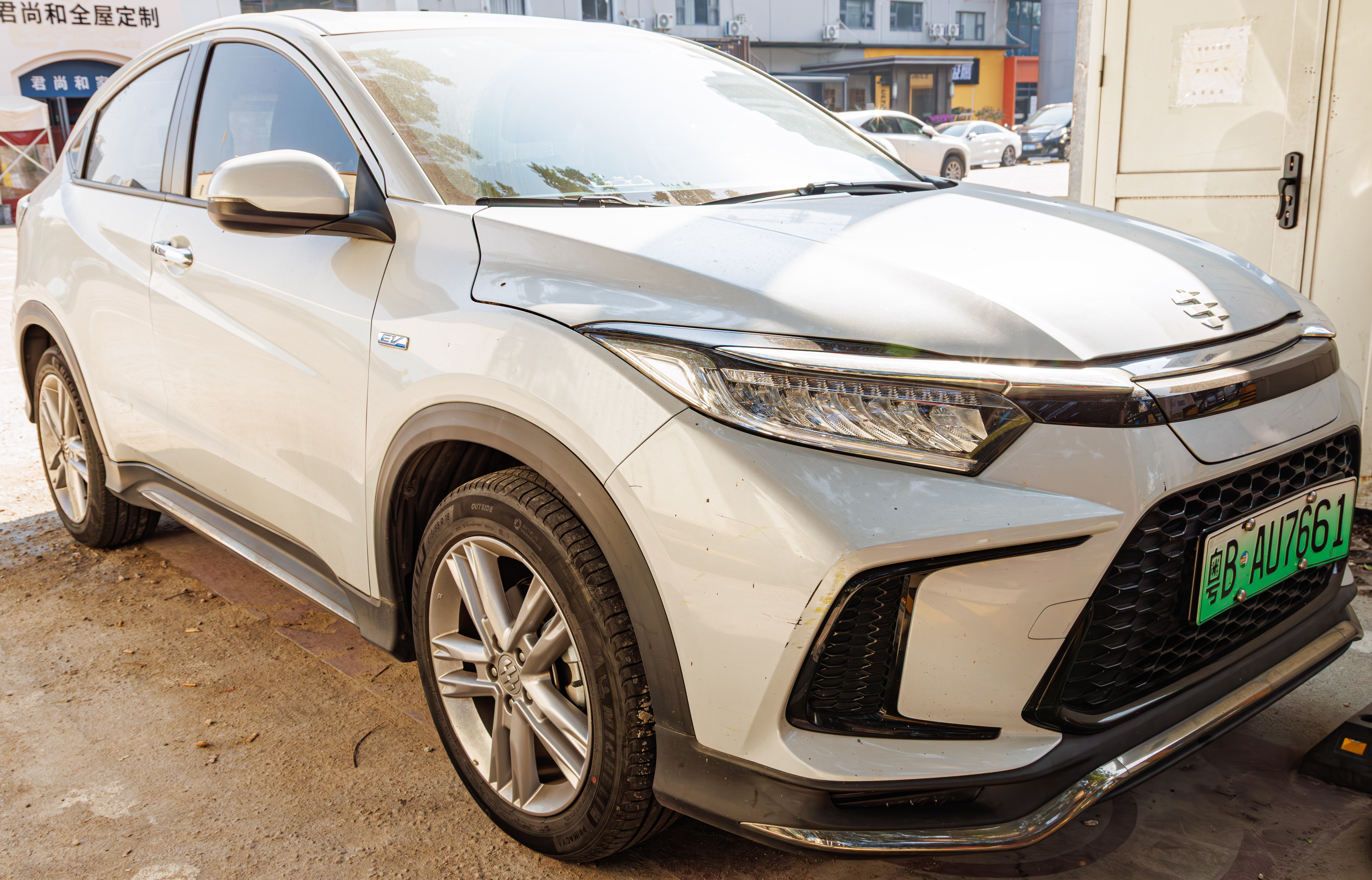
Everus VE-1 (facelift)

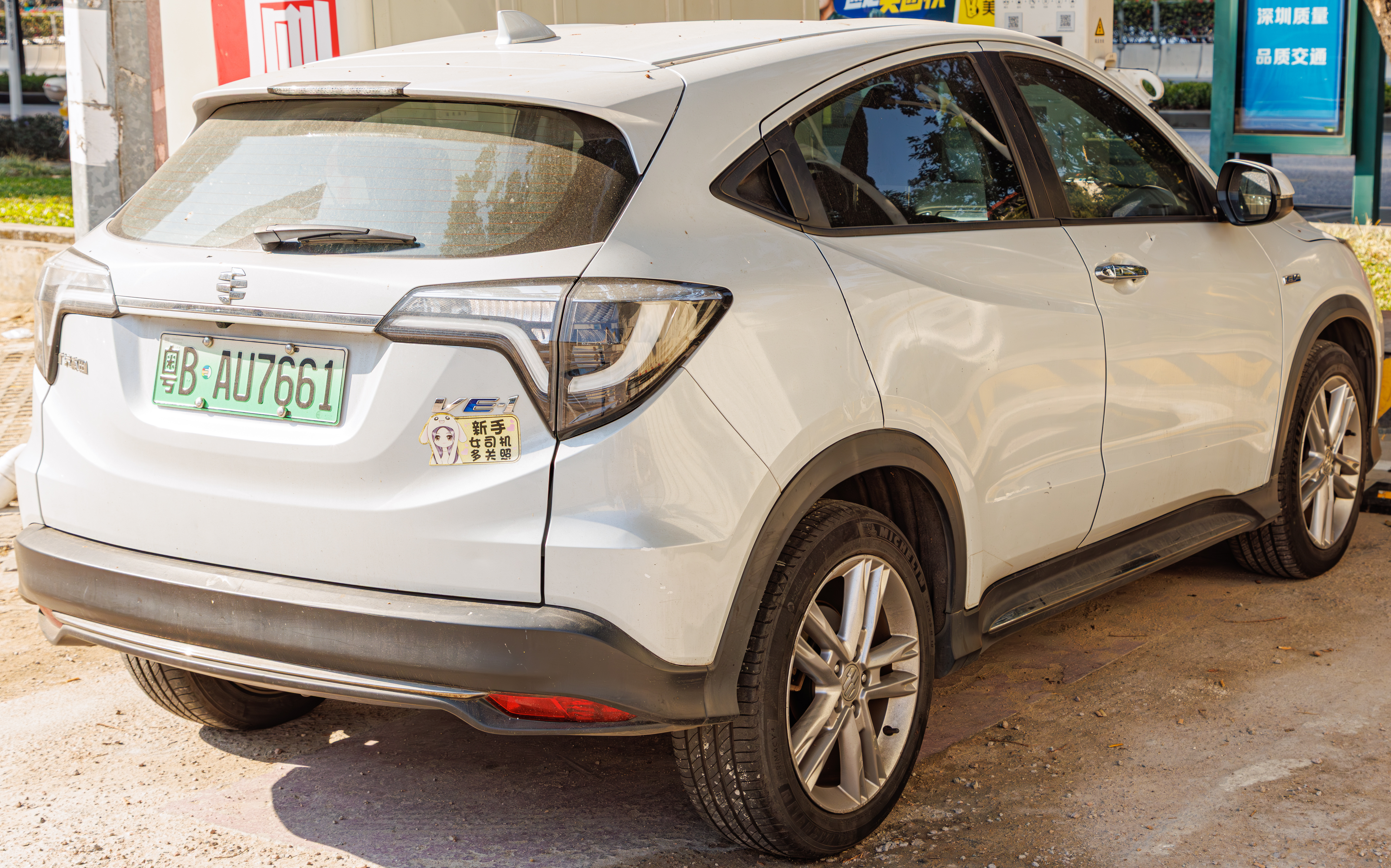
Everus VE-1 (facelift)

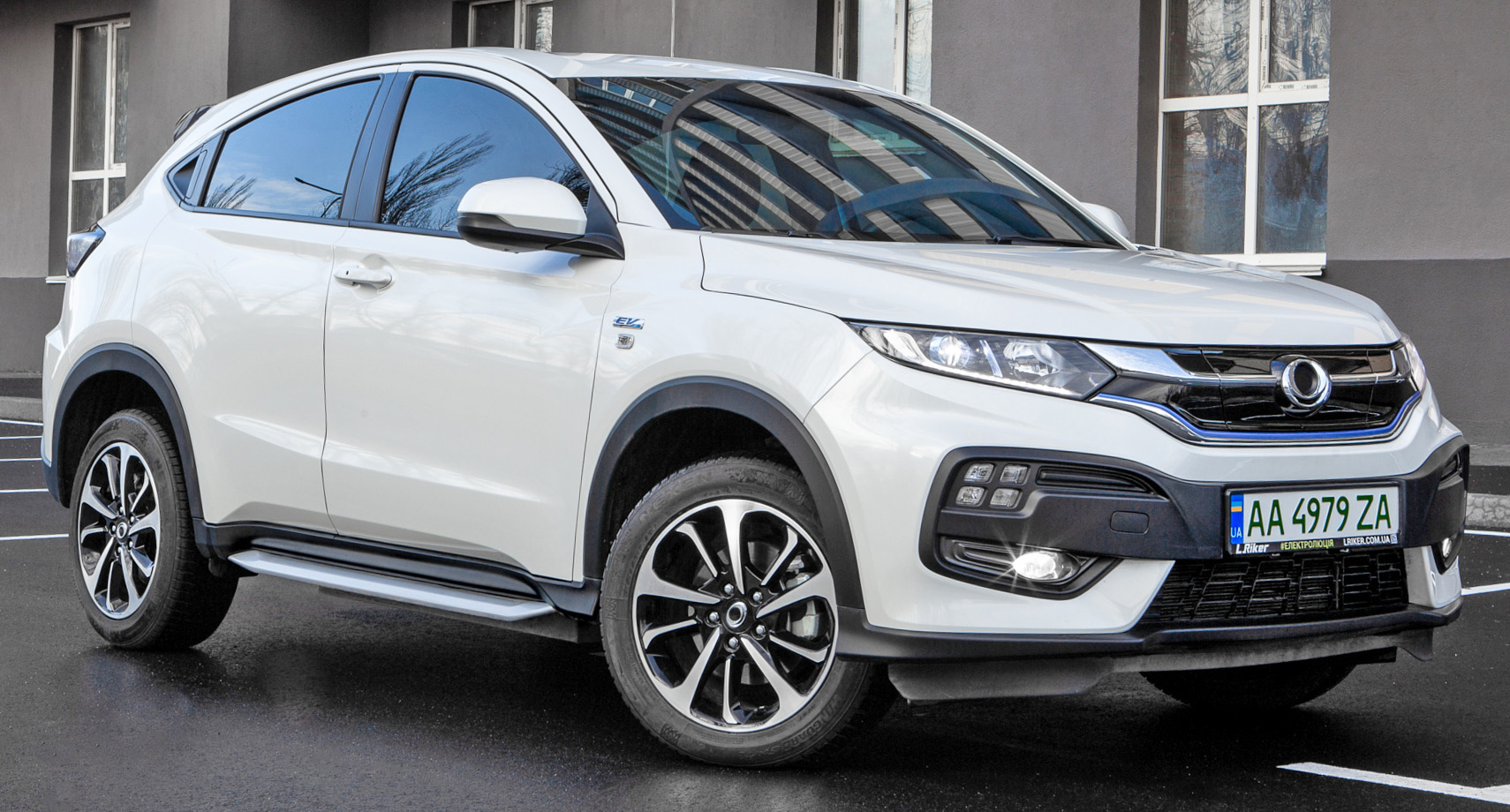
2020 Ciimo X-NV

2020 Ciimo X-NV

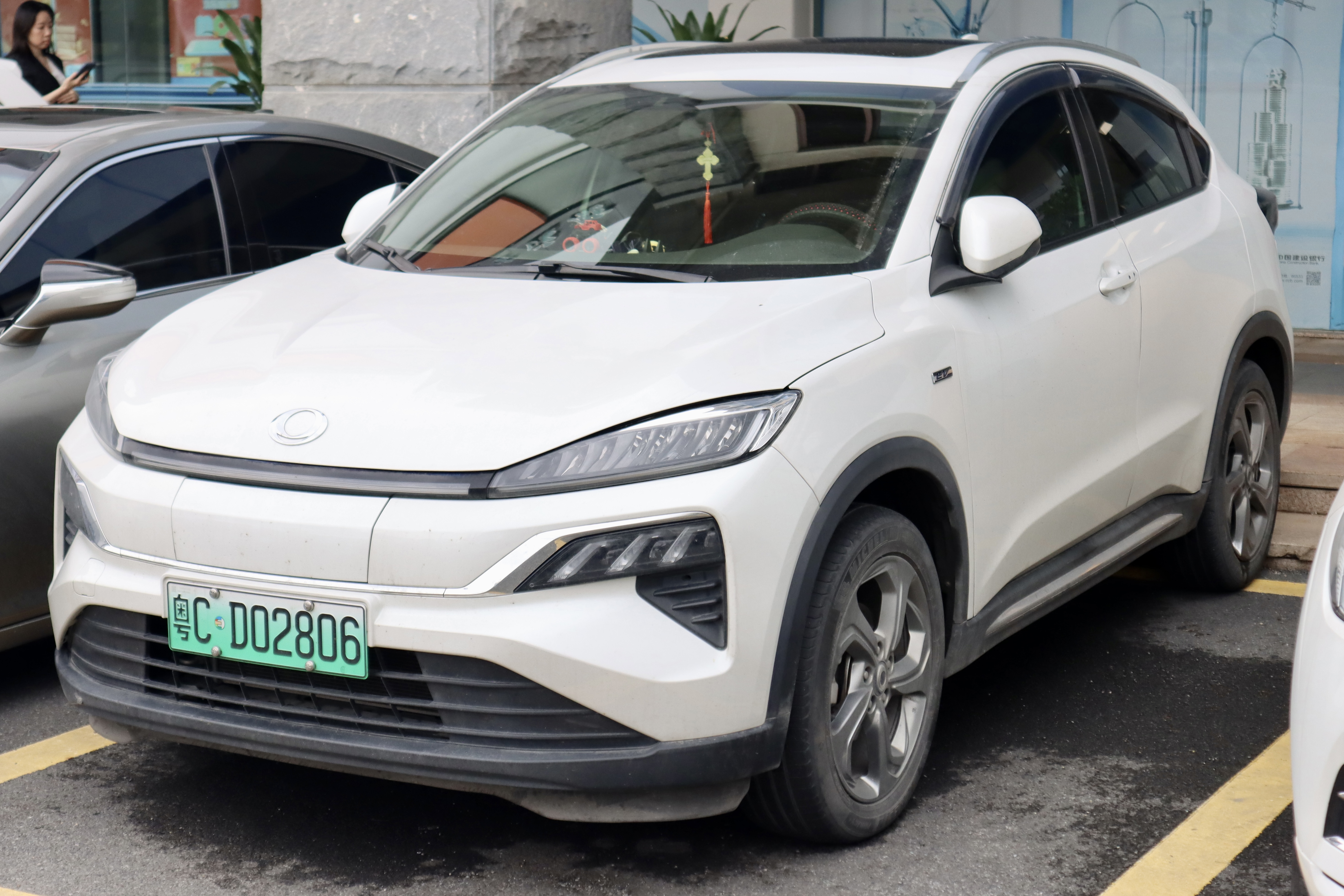
2021 Ciimo M-NV

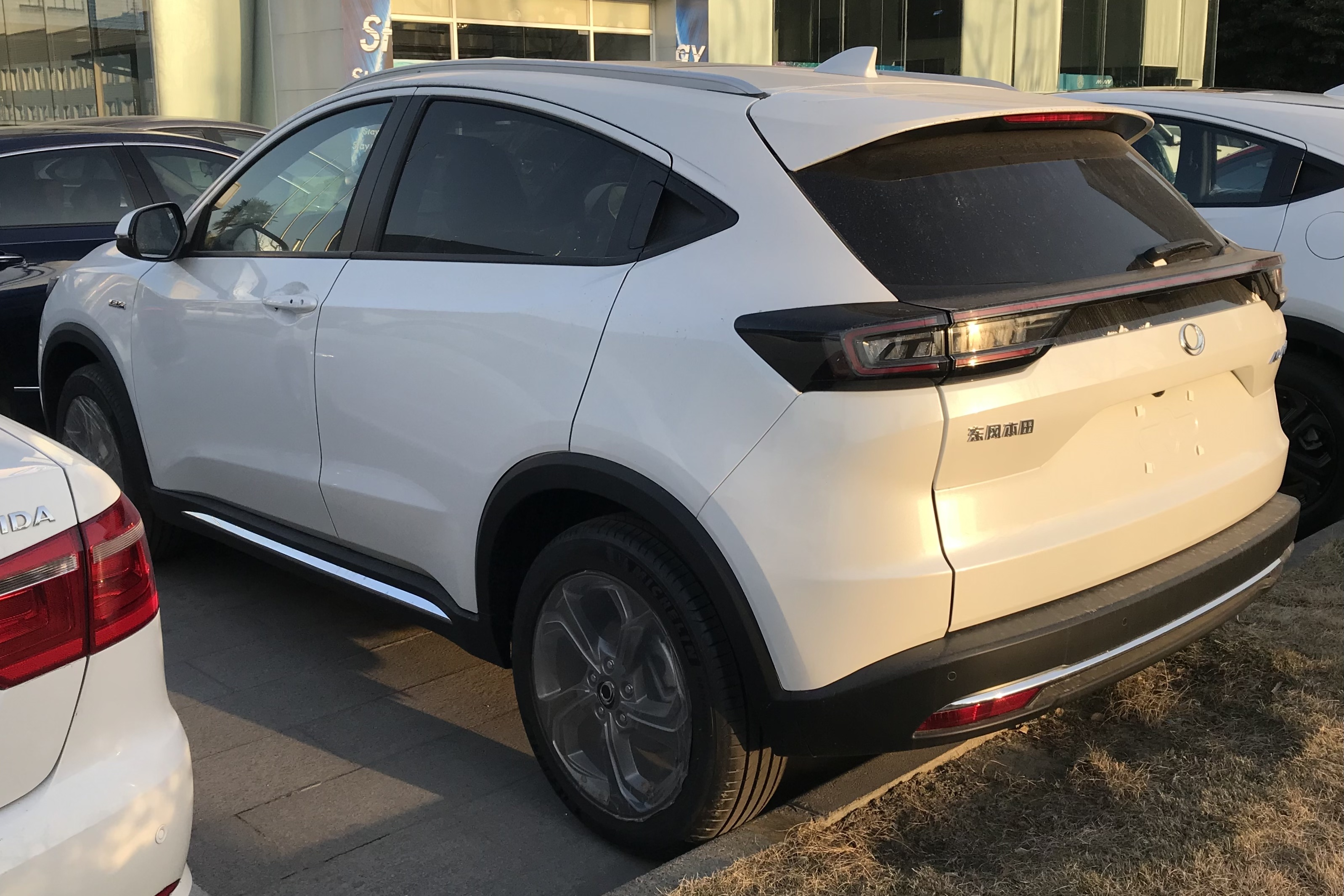
2021 Ciimo M-NV

==== Europe ====
The HR-V was unveiled in the European market in September 2014 as the HR-V Prototype. The specs was further detailed in February 2015, and it went on sale in September 2015. European-market models are sourced from both Mexico and Japan.

==== Indonesia ====
In Indonesia, the HR-V was revealed as a prototype model at the 22nd Indonesia International Motor Show on 18 September 2014, and was launched on 24 January 2015 as a locally assembled model. It is offered with 1.5-litre and 1.8-litre engine options. The 1.5-litre option were available in the base model A with manual transmission, slightly more equipped S with either manual or CVT7, and the CVT7 only E trim. The only trim available for 1.8-litre variant is the Prestige which is equipped with LED projector headlights with daytime running lights, two-tone alloy wheels, full leather interior and panoramic roof.

The Mugen body kits was added in 2016. Mugen body kits were optional for the 1.5 E and 1.8 Prestige variants.

The facelifted HR-V was launched at the 26th Gaikindo Indonesia International Auto Show on 2 August 2018. The 1.5 S and 1.5 E trims received projector headlights, while the 1.5 E Special Edition and 1.8 Prestige received full LED headlights and LED fog lights. The 1.5 A trim was dropped.

==== Japan ====
The Japanese Vezel models went on sale on 20 December 2013. The Vezel was available with two powertrains, as a conventional petrol-powered and as hybrid electric vehicle. In Japan, the hybrid version was expected to account for 90 percent of the Vezel sales. Its width dimension exceeds Japanese government dimension regulations (1,700 mm) which means Japanese buyers are liable for extra yearly taxes as a result.

The conventional Vezel is equipped with a 1.5-litre direct-injection DOHC i-VTEC inline-four engine coupled to a continuously variable transmission (CVT7), and it is available in front-wheel and all-wheel drive versions.

The Vezel hybrid version is equipped with Honda's next-generation sport hybrid i-DCD system that combines a 96 kW (131 PS), 156 N⋅m (115 lb⋅ft) 1.5-litre direct injection engine with a 22 kW (30 PS), 160 N⋅m (118 lb⋅ft) electric motor, Honda's Real Time AWD, Reactive Force Pedal. The hybrid version fuel economy is 27.0 km/L (3.7 L/100 km; 76.3 mpg_{‑imp}; 63.5 mpg_{‑US}) in the Japanese JC08 cycle, while the petrol version has a fuel economy of 20.6 km/L (4.9 L/100 km; 58.2 mpg_{‑imp}; 48.5 mpg_{‑US}) in the JC08 cycle.

The facelifted model was unveiled on 25 January 2018 in Japan and released later on 15 February 2018. It features a revised chrome bar grille and LED headlamps both being similar to Honda Civic, thin chrome garnish strip on the rear trunk and updated front bumper.

==== Malaysia ====
The HR-V was launched in Malaysia in February 2015 as a locally assembled model with three trim levels: S, E and V. All variants were updated in May 2016 where the previously offered 16 inch alloy wheels were swapped for 17 inch. A limited Mugen edition based on the V trim was launched in February 2018 and was limited to 1,020 units. Bookings open for the facelift version in July 2018 and in November 2018, a facelift HR-V was showcased during the 2018 Kuala Lumpur International Motor Show. In January 2019, the facelifted HR-V was launched with four trims: 1.8 E, 1.8 V, 1.8 RS and Sport Hybrid i-DCD. Malaysia became the only country outside of Japan to officially market the Vezel/HR-V hybrid.

==== North America ====
The second-generation Honda HR-V debuted at the 2014 New York International Auto Show as a concept car, with the production model unveiled later at the 2014 Los Angeles Auto Show. The HR-V was introduced in the United States in 2015 as a 2016 model. It shares the same platform as the third-generation Fit and is largely identical to the Vezel, which went on sale in Japan in December 2013. The HR-V is smaller than both CR-V and Pilot, again (after the demise of Element) giving Honda a model range with three crossover SUVs.

The US-market HR-V is manufactured at Honda's Celaya, Mexico assembly plant alongside the related Fit and went on sale in May 2015 as a 2016 model. It is powered by a 1.8-litre SOHC i-VTEC I4 engine mated either to a CVT7 transmission similar to the Civic or a 6-speed manual transmission (front-wheel drive only).

In 2018, for the 2019 model year, Honda announced the mid-cycle refresh for the HR-V. It features a revised chrome bar grille being similar to Honda Civic and new headlamp design featuring a single projector lens with DRLs or full LED headlamp similar to the Civic Touring, updated bumper design and overhead roof rails. There were two headlight options as well; full LED headlights for the touring trim, or halogen projector headlights for the other trims. On the interior, Apple CarPlay and Android Auto has been made available. The head unit was updated and features a volume knob replacing the volume slider. Honda Sensing is standard on EX trims and higher. Although the manual transmission is no longer available, Honda tweaked the CVT7 transmission as well as the optional all-wheel drive system. Two new trim levels for the HR-V, Sport and Touring, were added to the trim lineup, trims ranged from LX, Sport, EX, EX-L, and Touring.

==== Philippines ====
The HR-V was launched on 9 June 2015 and it was offered in three trim levels: S, E and EL. All models are only offered with the 1.8-litre engine mated with a CVT transmission.

The facelifted HR-V was launched on 24 August 2018 and it is offered in two trim levels: 1.8 E and 1.8 RS.

===== Singapore =====
In Singapore, the official Honda distributor sells the HR-V, while the parallel imported version retains the name Vezel.

Parallel importers brought in the petrol, RS and hybrid versions, while the official Honda distributor only brought the 1.5 petrol version in DX and LX trim levels.

==== Taiwan ====
The HR-V was introduced in Taiwan in October 2016 and is only available with the 1.8-litre engine. It comes in three different trims, the VTi, VTi-S and S. All models feature a CVT transmission, with the VTi featuring seven gear ratios (including L), whereas the VTi-S and S have five gear ratios. For the 2019 refresh, the VTi model was discontinued. The refresh also brought the CVT gearbox to the VTi-S model, as well as several other minor tweaks, like 17-inch alloy wheels (up from 16-inch). The S trim was updated with full LED lights, an updated entertainment system with improved reversing camera and a few other minor tweaks.

==== Thailand ====
In Thailand, the HR-V went on sale on 17 November 2014. It is powered by 1.8-litre engine with four trim levels namely S, E, E Limited and EL.

==== Others ====
The HR-V was launched in Pakistan in 2015 but was later discontinued owing to poor sales. Despite being a global model, Honda did not market the second-generation HR-V in India where it has significant operations, citing uncompetitive pricing compared to its rivals and potentially high investment for the localization of components. A Honda executive cited an example of the crossover's electric parking brake which comes standard with the vehicle that would inflate the cost, while the vehicle was not designed with a manual handbrake in mind. Honda offered the cheaper Brio-based BR-V and the Fit/Jazz-based WR-V instead. The company has started a project from late 2017 to produce and market the second-generation HR-V in India from December 2019, only to be shelved again due to low sales forecast.

=== Powertrain ===
Petrol engines
Model	Engine	Displacement	Power	Torque	Transmissions	Year
1.5 i-VTEC	L15Z	1,497 cc (91.4 cu in) I4	120 PS (118 hp; 88 kW) at 6,600 rpm	145 N⋅m (107 lb⋅ft) at 4,600 rpm	6-speed manual CVT	2015–2022
1.5 i-VTEC	L15B	1,497 cc (91.4 cu in) I4	132 PS (130 hp; 97 kW) at 6,600 rpm	155 N⋅m (114 lb⋅ft) at 4,600 rpm	6-speed manual CVT	2013–2022
1.5 VTEC Turbo	L15B7	1,497 cc (91.4 cu in) turbocharged I4	185 PS (182 hp; 136 kW) at 5,500 rpm	240 N⋅m (180 lb⋅ft) at 1,900–5,000 rpm (manual); 220 N⋅m (160 lb⋅ft) at 1,700–5,500 rpm (CVT)	6-speed manual CVT	2018–2021
1.5 i-VTEC Hybrid	LEB	1,497 cc (91.4 cu in) I4	132 PS (130 hp; 97 kW) at 6,600 rpm (engine); 30 PS (30 hp; 22 kW) at 1,313–2,000 rpm (motor); 152 PS (150 hp; 112 kW) (combined output)	156 N⋅m (115 lb⋅ft) at 4,600 rpm (engine); 160 N⋅m (120 lb⋅ft) at 0–1,313 rpm (motor); 190 N⋅m (140 lb⋅ft) (combined output)	7-speed DCT	2013–2022
1.8 i-VTEC	R18Z9	1,799 cc (109.8 cu in) I4	141 PS (139 hp; 104 kW) at 6,500 rpm	174 N⋅m (128 lb⋅ft) at 4,300 rpm	6-speed manual CVT	2014–2022
Diesel engine						
Model	Engine	Displacement	Power	Torque	Transmissions	Year
1.6 i-DTEC	N16A	1,598 cc (97.5 cu in) turbocharged I4	120 PS (118 hp; 88 kW) at 4,000 rpm	300 N⋅m (221 lb⋅ft) at 2,000 rpm	6-speed manual	2015–2020

=== Safety ===
- (European Union) + (United Kingdom) - Euro NCAP -
- (United States) - NHTSA -

2016 HR-V NHTSA scores
Overall:	5/5 stars
Frontal Driver:	4/5 stars
Frontal Passenger:	4/5 stars
Side Driver:	5/5 stars
Side Passenger:	5/5 stars
Side Pole Driver:	5/5 stars
Rollover:	/ 15.3%

ASEAN NCAP test results Honda HR-V (2015)
Test	Points	Stars
Adult occupant:	15.21	4 /5 stars
Child occupant:	73%	4 /5 stars
Safety assist:	NA	

ASEAN NCAP test results Honda HR-V (2015)
Test	Points	Stars
Adult occupant:	15.21	5 /5 stars
Child occupant:	73%	4 /5 stars
Safety assist:	NA	

ANCAP test results* Honda HR-V (2015)
Test	Score
Overall	5 /5 stars
Frontal offset	15.21/16
Side impact	16/16
Pole	2/2
Seat belt reminders	3/3
Whiplash protection	Good
Pedestrian protection	Adequate
Electronic stability control	Standard

Latin NCAP 1.5 test results Honda HR-V + 2 Airbags (2015, similar to Euro NCAP 2002)
Test	Points	Stars
Adult occupant:	16.70/17.0	5 /5 stars
Child occupant:	43.30/49.00	5 /5 stars

=== Recall ===
Vezel Hybrid produced in Japan from July 2013 through February 2014 were recalled due to a problem with the software program controlling the 7-speed dual clutch transmission (DCT) which could cause a delay in the ability to begin driving or the inability to move at all.

Honda recalled 160,000 Fit subcompact and Vezel sport-utility vehicles, manufactured from August 2013 through February 2016 in Japan, because of defective power steering and a part that controls the electric current in the vehicles. The recall does not affect any Honda models sold abroad.

== Third generation (2021) ==
=== Global version (RV/RS1; 2021) ===
The second-generation Vezel/third-generation HR-V was unveiled on 18 February 2021 in Japan, with sales commenced in Japan on 22 April 2021. The internal combustion model is based on the Honda Global Small Car platform sharing its platform with the fourth-generation Fit/Jazz/Life and the seventh-generation City/Ballade.

A battery electric version of the third-generation HR-V was revealed in China in October 2021 as the Honda e:NS1 and e:NP1, which is manufactured by Dongfeng Honda and Guangqi Honda respectively. Both are based on the e:N Architecture F platform used for smaller, front-wheel drive battery electric vehicles. Outside China, the battery electric model is marketed as the e:Ny1 in Europe and e:N1 in Asian and New Zealand markets.

The facelifted model was unveiled on 14 March 2024. Changes include an updated front fascia design and new LED graphics for the rear taillights, new exterior colours, the interior received minor changes, the e:HEV model received an updated energy management control and new safety features included in the Honda Sensing safety system.

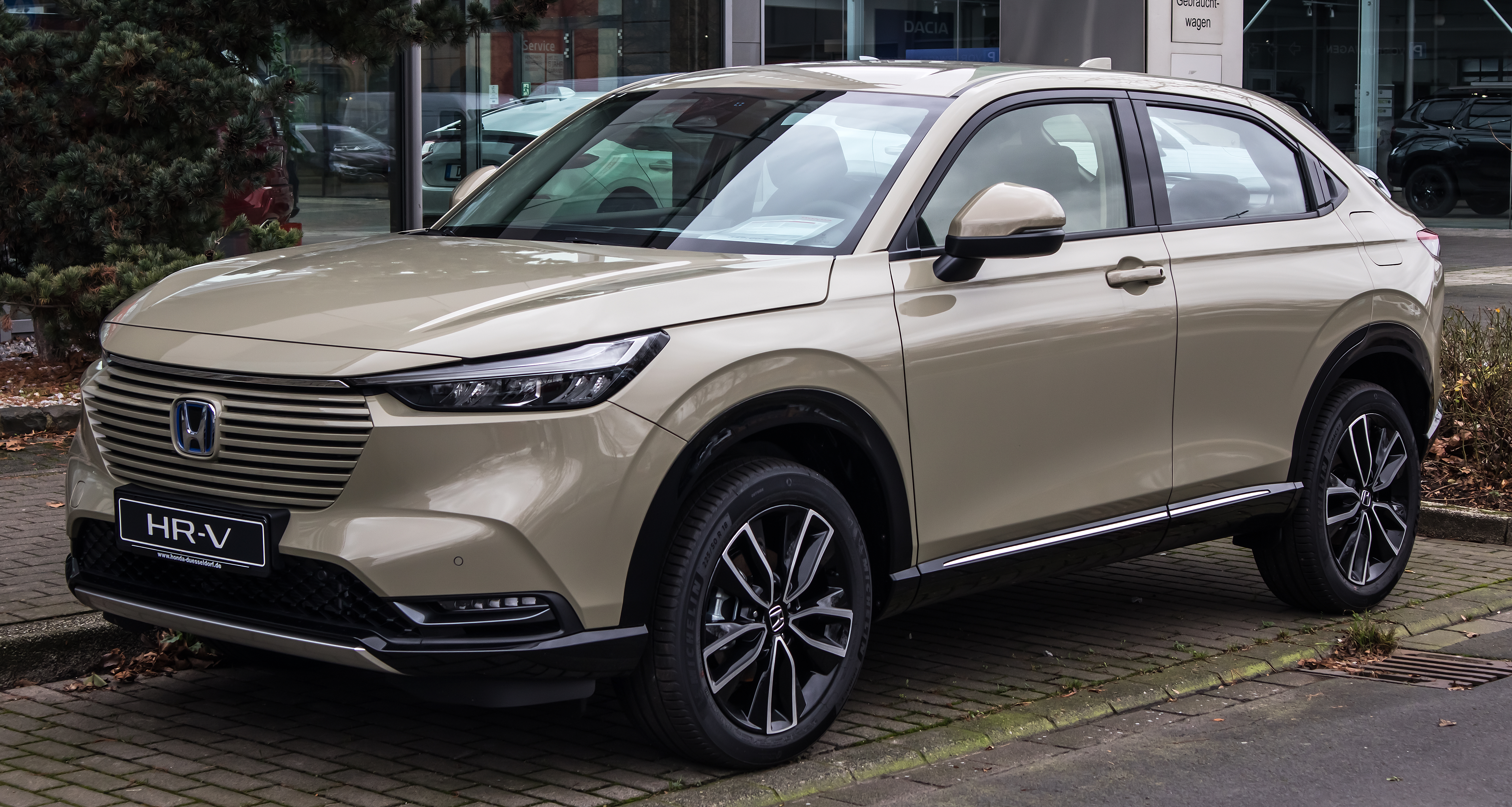
2023 HR-V e:HEV Advance (RV5; pre-facelift, Europe)

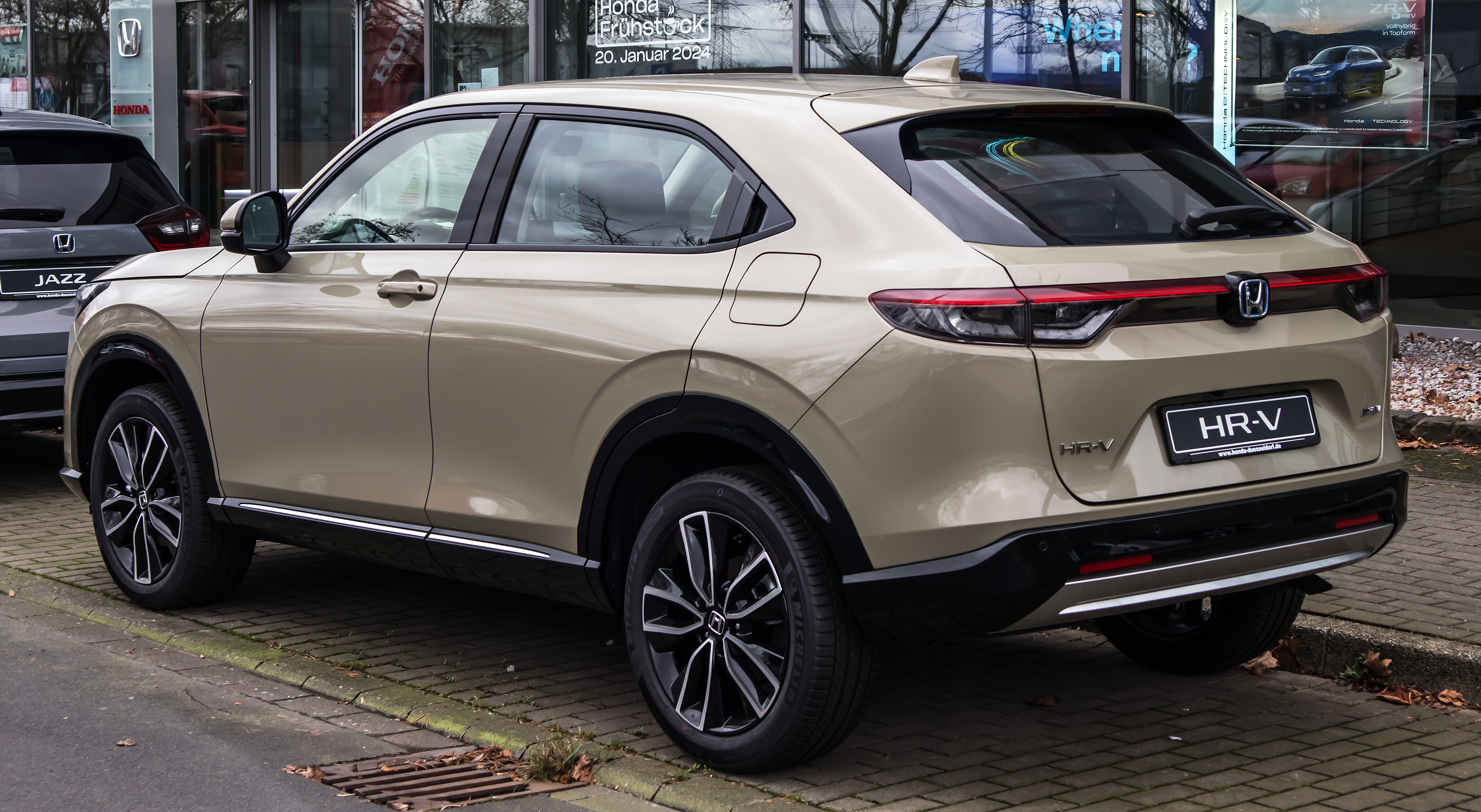
Rear view (pre-facelift; Europe)

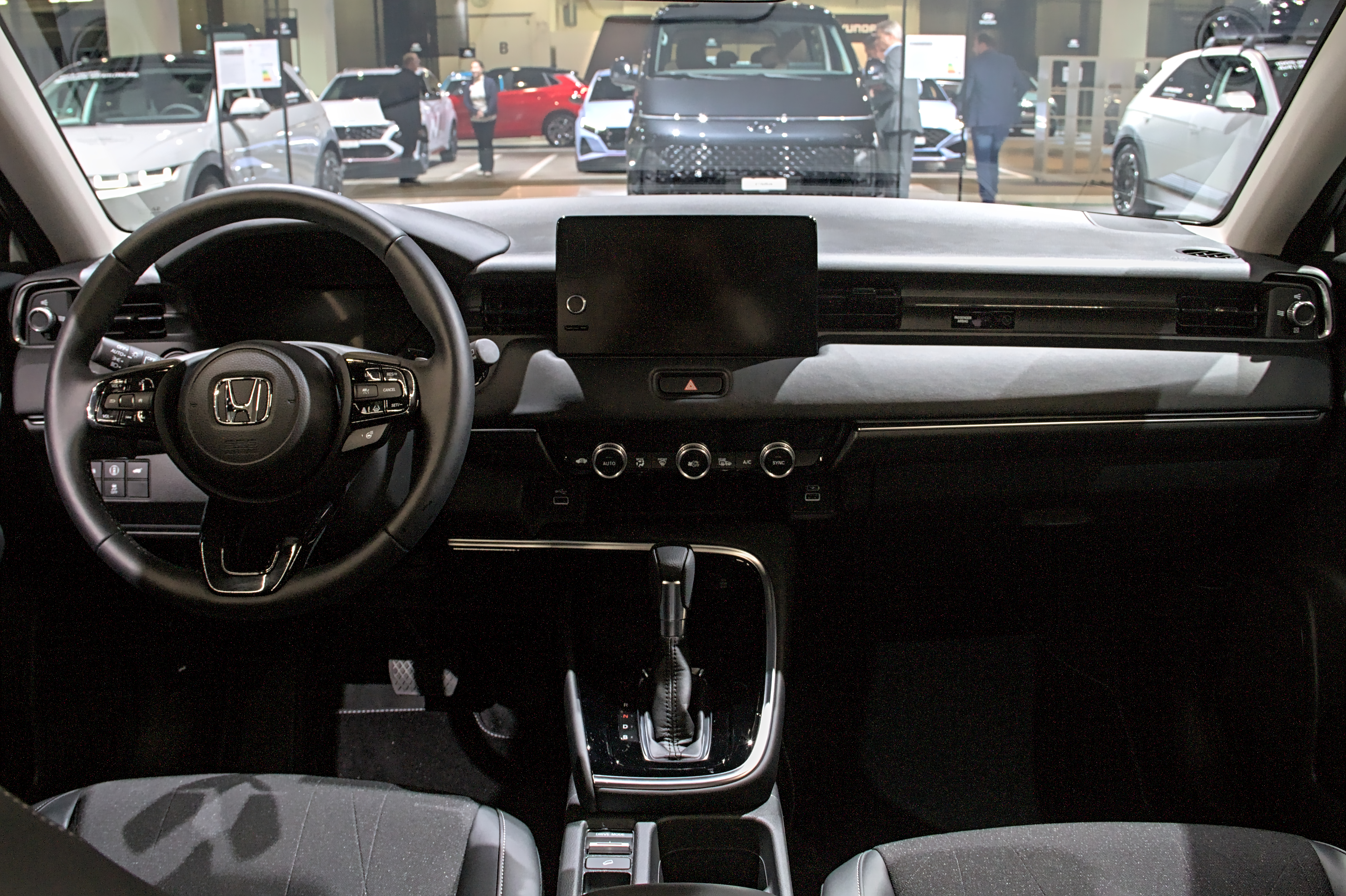
Interior

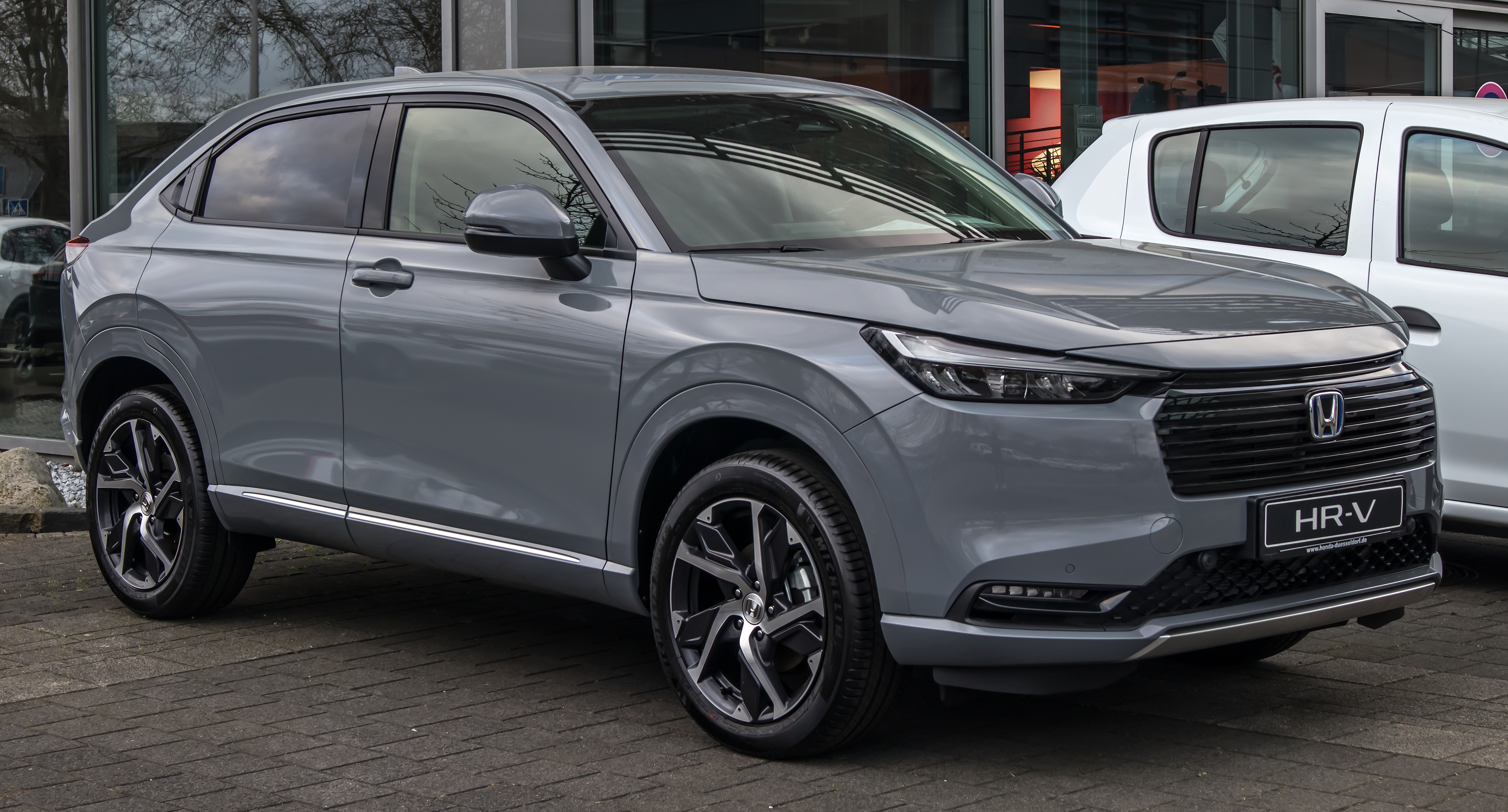
2025 HR-V e:HEV Advance Plus (RV5; facelift, Europe)

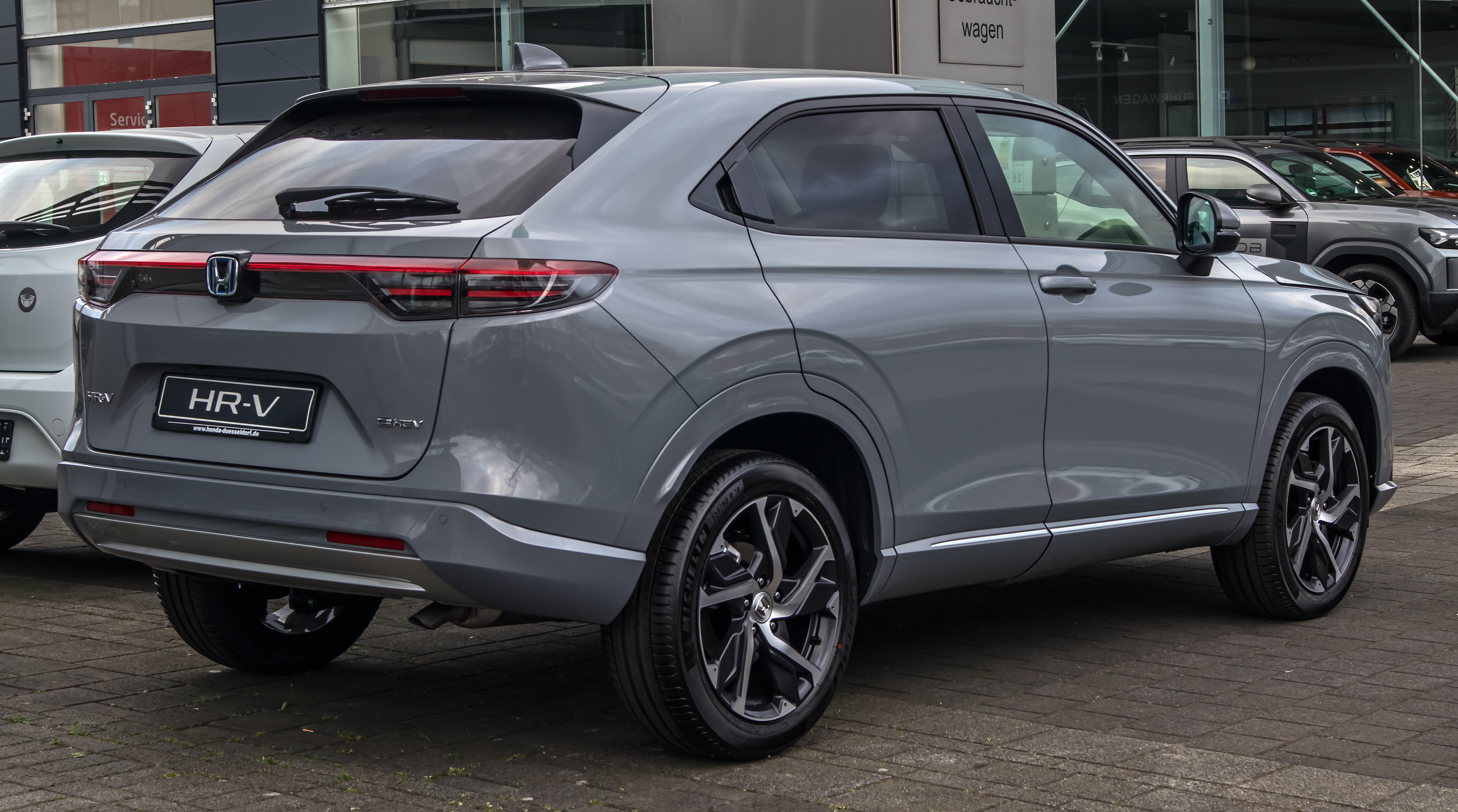
Rear view (facelift, Europe)

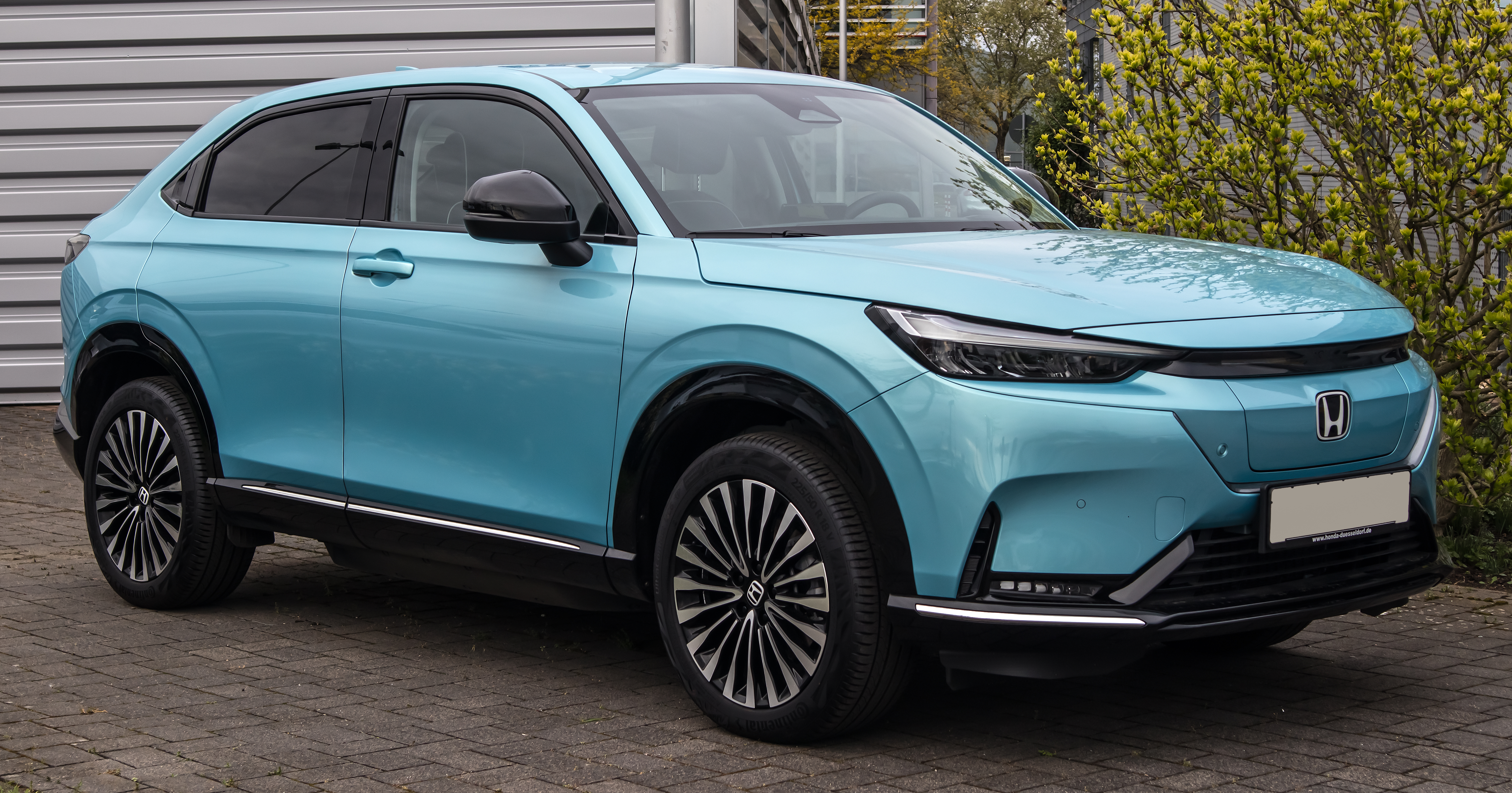
Honda e:Ny1 (Europe)

=== North American and Chinese version / ZR-V (RZ1/RZ2; 2022) ===
A separate North American HR-V model was unveiled on 4 April 2022 and went on sale on 7 June 2022 for the 2023 model year. Based on the Honda Architecture (HA) platform shared with the Civic (eleventh generation) and categorized as a compact crossover SUV, it was sold outside of North America, such as in China (as the ZR-V and HR-V) and Europe (as the ZR-V) to positioned between the global HR-V model and the CR-V. Chinese models are produced by both Guangqi Honda (ZR-V, until 2026) and Dongfeng Honda (HR-V) respectively.

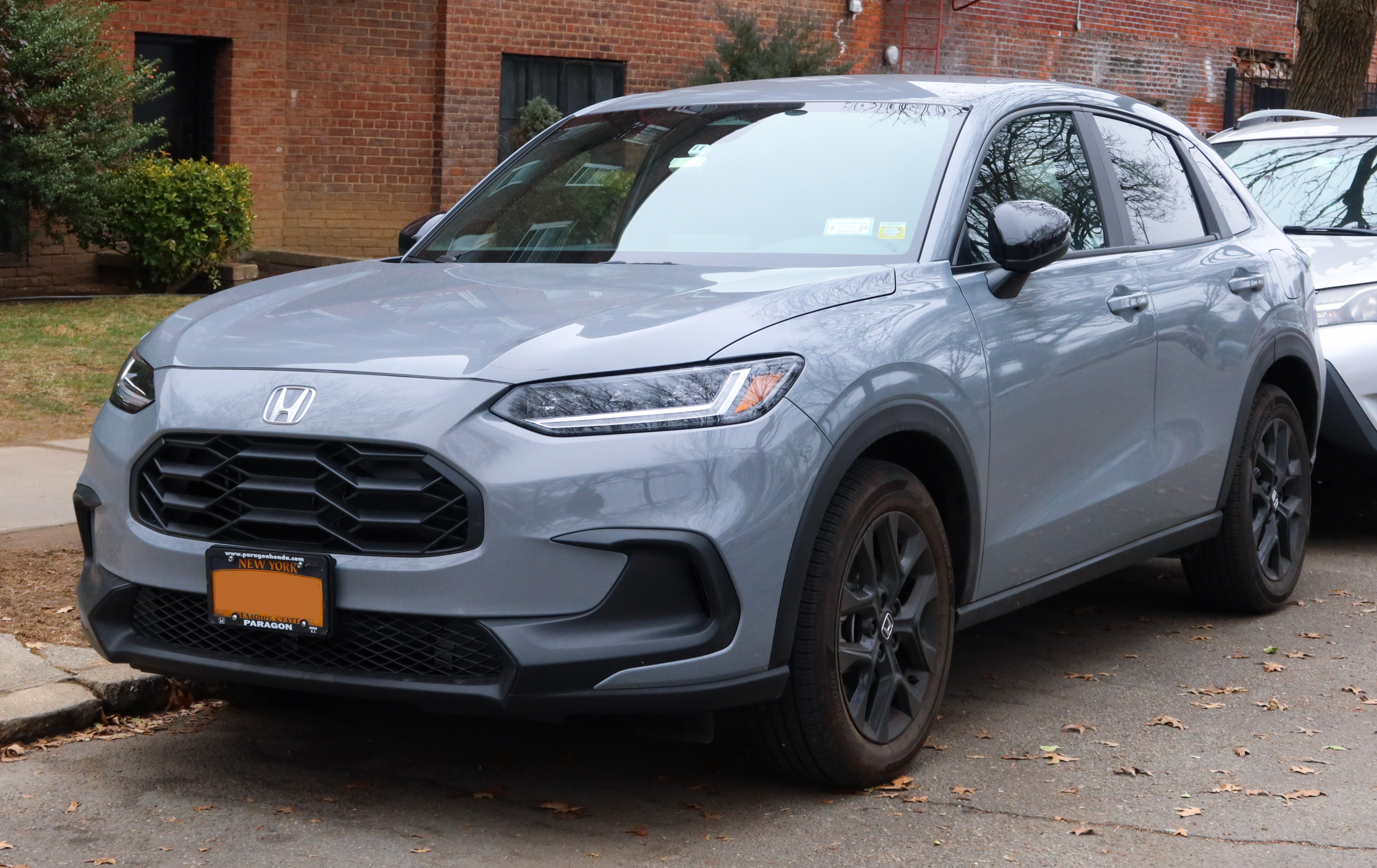
2023 HR-V Sport (US)

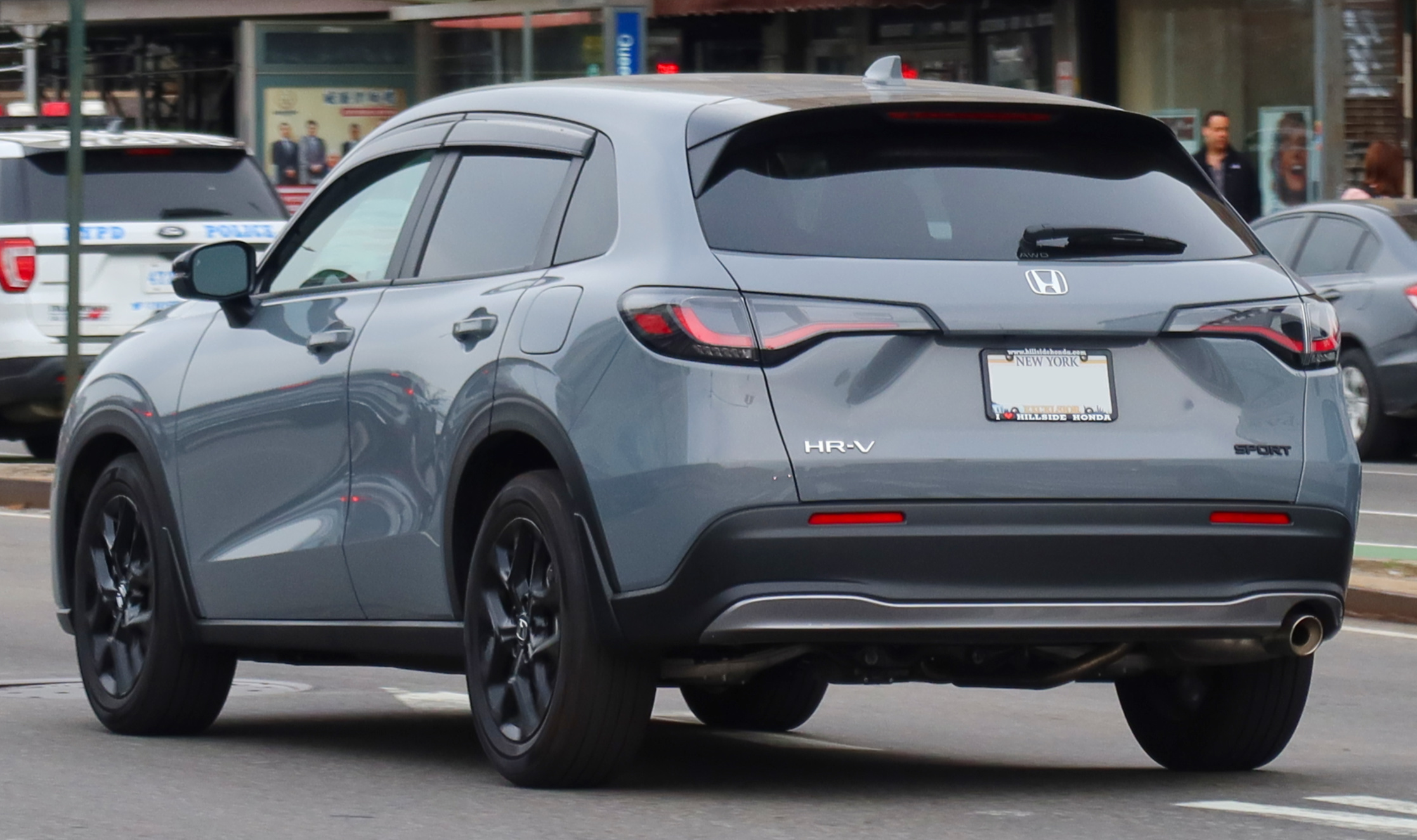
Rear view (US)

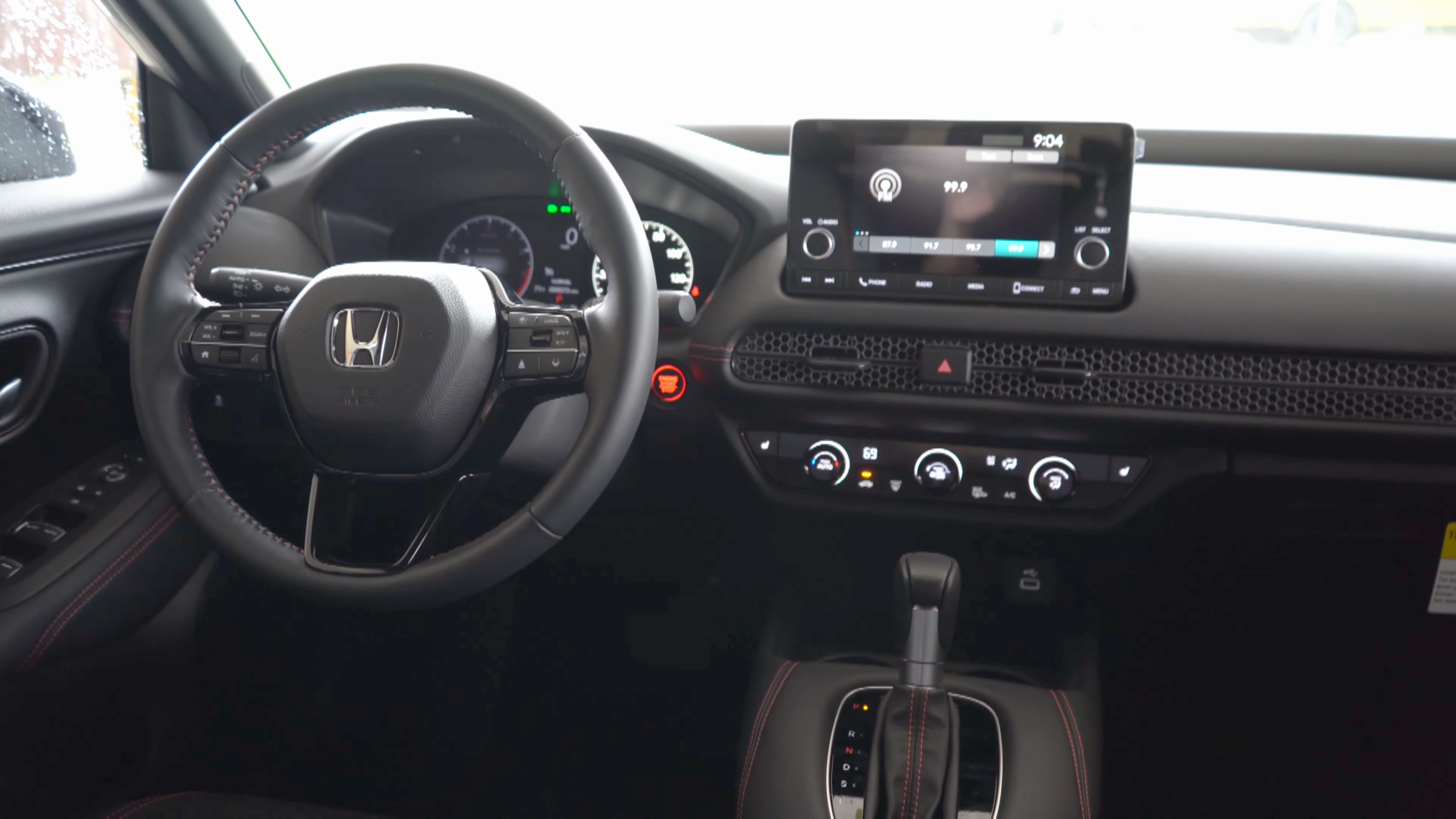
Interior (HR-V Sport, US)

== Sales ==
Calendar year (Note: Sales figures for North America for calendar year 2022 onwards are based on the ZR-V.)	Japan	US	Canada	Mexico	Brazil	Europe
2014	96,029					
2015	71,021	41,969	7,213	12,567	51,159	7,621
2016	73,889	82,041	12,371	18,603	55,758	33,064
2017	64,332	94,034	14,149	19,396	47,775	29,375
2018	59,629	85,494	9,071	13,052	47,959	25,920
2019	55,886	99,104	12,985	17,175	49,488	21,747
2020	32,931	84,027	12,068	11,441	32,515	14,390
2021	52,669	137,090	11,616	12,768	38,411	6,989
2022	50,736	115,416	11,031	8,264	15,383	
2023	59,187	122,206	11,896	9,061	48,061	
2024	75,424	151,468		9,366	50,365	
2025	67,239	148,771		10,069	61,234	

=== Southeast Asia ===
Calendar Year	Taiwan	Thailand	Indonesia	Malaysia (Note: Figures based on registration (Malaysia))
2014		3,764		
2015		26,417	36,425	19,964
2016	2,648	15,590	44,331	24,645
2017	13,398	15,371	39,081	19,121
2018	10,157	15,682	34,891	8,572
2019	9,244		21,980	16,179
2020	7,999	7,884	13,021	10,172
2021	4,579	4,736	16,802	11,028
2022	4,258	18,005	25,230	11,021
2023	7,055	23,631	25,856	19,865
2024		20,053	16,211	21,303
2025			11,852	18,059

=== China ===
Year	Vezel	XR-V	e:NP1	e:NS1	Ciimo M-NV	Everus VE-1	Ciimo X-NV
2014	22,545	526	—	—	—	—	—
2015	126,838	118,749	—	—	—	—	—
2016	164,076	161,711	—	—	—	—	—
2017	146,906	167,952	—	—	—	—	—
2018	34,891	141,600	—	—	—	100	—
2019	106,788	147,203	—	—	—	1,555	1,507
2020	150,363	168,272	—	—	540	2,376	6,579
2021	173,899	187,776	—	—	5,391	2,513	658
2022	108,961	101,203	3,608	5,180	10,023	1,503	—
2023	38,476	52,102	3,574	6,188	2,064	3	—
2024	15,502	20,660	1,110	1,217	1,293	—	—
2025	5,633	4,045	625	1,360	—	—	—
