= RE4 (disambiguation) =

Resident Evil 4 is a 2005 video game.

RE4 or RE 4 may also refer to:

  - Resident Evil 4 (2023 video game), a remake to the above game
  - Resident Evil: Afterlife, the fourth film in the live action series
  - Resident Evil: Death Island, the fourth film in the animated series
- the Wupper-Express (RE 4), a rail service in Germany
- the RegioExpress route RE4, a rail service in Switzerland
- RE4, a chassis code for Honda CR-V (third generation)
- (10594) 1996 RE4, a minor planet
