= RE7 (disambiguation) =

RE7 is short for the video game Resident Evil 7: Biohazard.

RE7 or RE 7 may also refer to:

- the Rhein-Münsterland-Express (RE 7), a rail service in Germany
- The S7/RE7: Weinfelden – Lindau-Reutin, a rail service line in Austria
- RE7 experiment, a CERN experiment
- RE7, a chassis code for Honda CR-V (third generation)
- (8497) 1990 RE7, a minor planet
- (13968) 1991 RE7, a minor planet
- 2020 RE7, a centaur
