= Honda Crossroad =

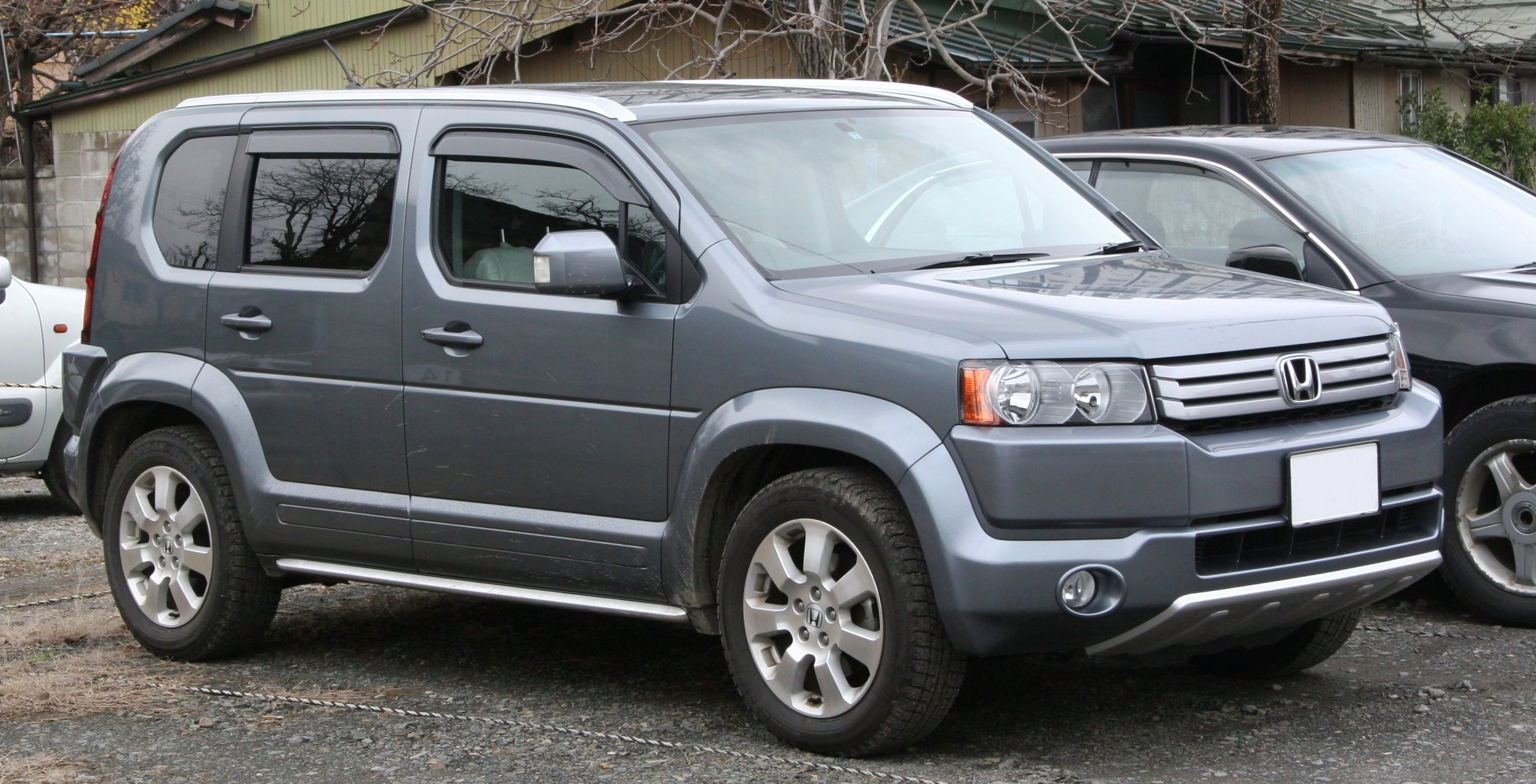

Overview
- Manufacturer: Honda
- Production: 1993–1998; 2007–2010

Body and chassis
- Class: Mid-size SUV (First generation); Compact crossover (Second generation)
- Body style: 5-door SUV
- Layout: FR/4WD; FF/4WD

Chronology
- Successor: Honda CR-V

The Honda Crossroad (ホンダクロスロード, Honda Kurosurōdo) is an automobile nameplate used by two SUVs sold by Honda only in Japan. The vehicle's first generation was a rebadged Land Rover Discovery sold in Japan between 1993 and 1998, while the second generation was a more compact crossover vehicle introduced in 2007. The vehicle's last generation was produced until 2010, and was succeeded by the Honda CR-V.

== First generation (LJ/LJJ; 1993) ==
First generation
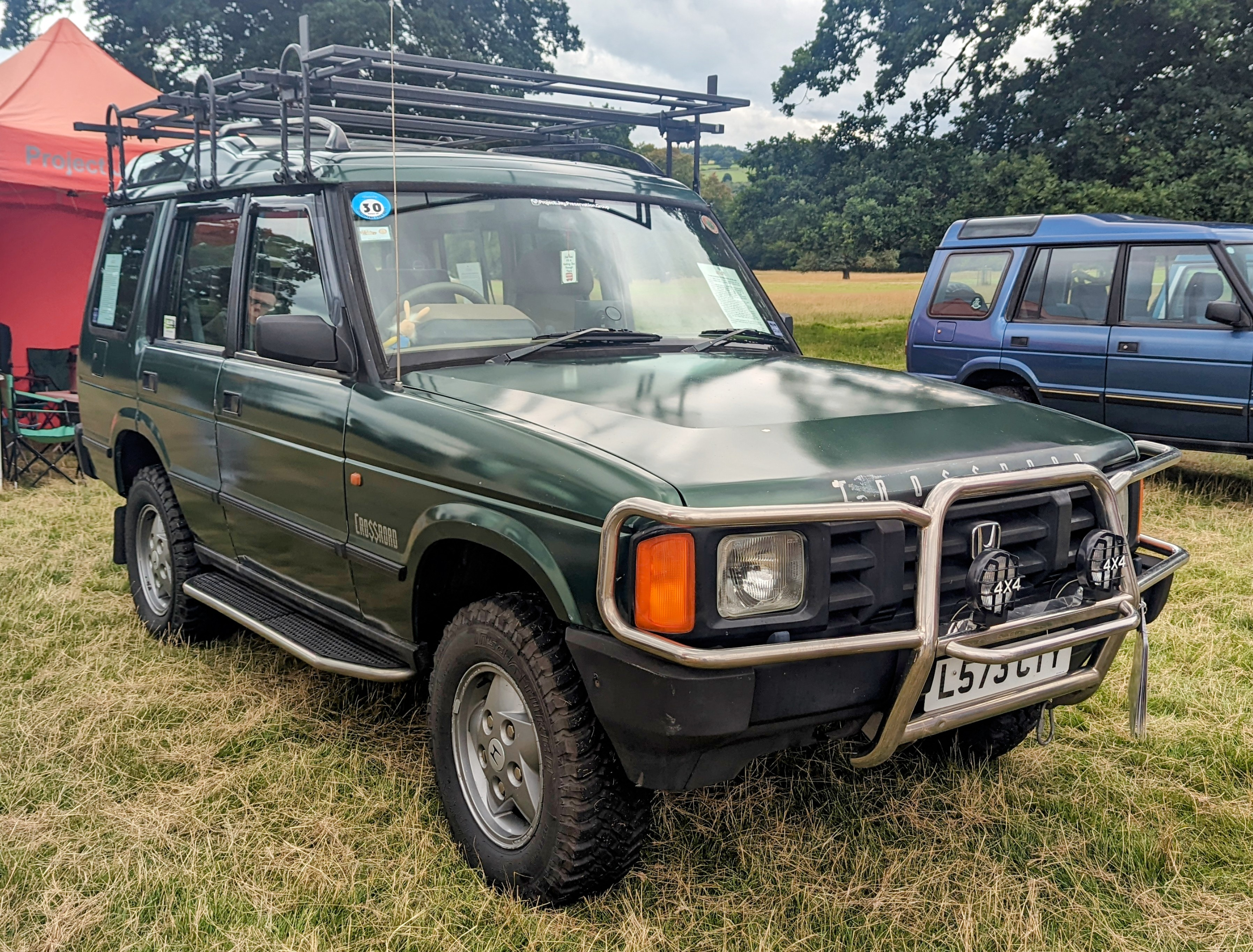
- 1994 LJ/LJJ Honda Crossroad

Overview
- Manufacturer: Rover Company (Solihull plant)
- Model code: LJ/LJJ
- Also called: Land Rover Discovery Series I
- Production: 1993–1998

Body and chassis
- Class: Mid-size SUV
- Body style: 5-door SUV
- Layout: Front-engine, rear-wheel-drive Front-engine, four-wheel-drive

Powertrain
- Engine: 3.9 L Rover 3.9 V8 (gasoline)
- Transmission: 4-speed automatic

Dimensions
- Wheelbase: 2,540 mm (100.0 in)
- Length: 4,535 mm (178.5 in)
- Width: 1,800 mm (70.9 in)
- Height: 1,950 mm (76.8 in)
- Curb weight: 1,970 kg (4,340 lb)

Honda marketed the Crossroad (model code LJ, stylized as Cro$$road) in the Japanese market from October 13, 1993 to 1998 — as a rebadged Land Rover Discovery Series I. To date, the Crossroad is the only production vehicle sold by Honda to ever have a V8 engine. The 3.9-liter Rover unit produces 180 PS (132 kW) at 4,750 rpm.

The Crossroad was introduced to compete with popular off-roaders offered by Toyota, Isuzu, Nissan and Mitsubishi; it was initially marketed in 3- and 5-door variants; and was manufactured at Rover's Solihull plant.

At the end of July 1994, the Crossroad was updated with added safety equipment including twin front airbags, standard ABS, door beams. Front and rear anti-roll bars were also added, while the grille and aluminum wheels were redesigned and the dashboard was revised. The three-door model was discontinued and a new (five-door) ES model was released, with additional equipment including full leather, double electric sunroofs, cruise control, and a separate air conditioning system for the rear seat. In March 1996, Honda announced a 25-percent price reduction for the base V8i model along with some equipment cuts, such as removing the third row of seats, making the car a five-seater. The model code was changed to LJJ at this time.

Problems had emerged regarding the marketing of the Crossroad. For instance, Honda had threatened to end ties with Rover after the news that it was going to be sold to BMW. In 1997, a recall was issued by Honda on the advice of Ministry of Transportation due to a malfunction locking mechanism on the SUV's driver-side front door that could make the door open while driving. Around 4,754 vehicles made from July 1995 to December 1996 were affected by the recall.

== Second generation (RT; 2007) ==
Second generation
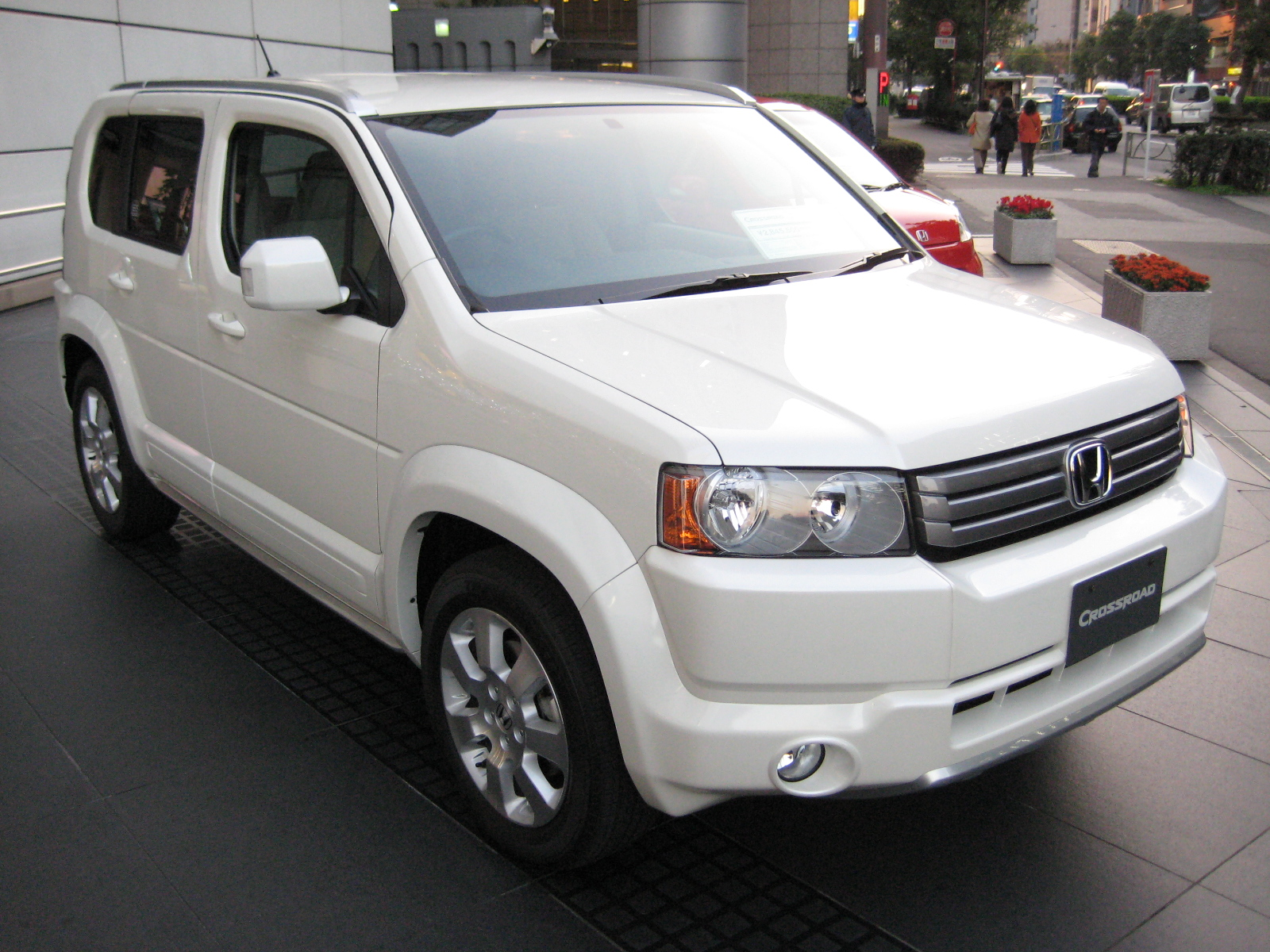
- Honda Crossroad (RT)

Overview
- Model code: RT1/2/3/4
- Production: 2007–2010
- Designer: Takehiro Ishibashi and Yosuke Tokoro

Body and chassis
- Class: Compact SUV
- Body style: 5-door SUV
- Layout: Front-engine, front-wheel-drive Front-engine, all-wheel-drive
- Related: Honda Stream (second generation)

Powertrain
- Engine: 1.8 L R18A VTEC I4; 2.0 L R20A VTEC I4
- Transmission: 5-speed automatic

Dimensions
- Wheelbase: 2,700 mm (106.3 in)
- Length: 4,285 mm (168.7 in)
- Width: 1,775 mm (69.9 in)
- Height: 1,669 mm (65.7 in)

Chronology
- Successor: Honda Vezel; Honda CR-V

The Crossroad name was resurrected as a new crossover SUV for the Japanese market on February 23, 2007. The vehicle combines the exterior design of an SUV with the length of a compact car and the 3-row seating and 7-passenger capacity. The Crossroad is designed for people to enjoy their active new lifestyles, targeting young couples in their 20s and 30s with small children. While the engines were smaller than two litres and the car was short enough, the wide body meant that the car was classified as a regular-sized car ("3 number"), with a significantly higher tax burden as a result.

Under the hood, the Crossroad sports one of two straight-four engines of 1.8 L and 2.0 L in displacement. Power outputs are 140 and 150 PS (103 and 110 kW) respectively. Both were mated to the only available transmission: a 5-speed automatic. Honda's Real-Time AWD system has been thoroughly revised for the Crossroad. It now works in conjunction with stability and traction control as well as ABS brakes. For the first time in a Honda, the Crossroad will be equipped with Hill-Start Assist which temporarily maintains brake pressure after the brake pedal is released when starting on a hill. Under normal driving conditions, the Crossroad behaves as a FWD vehicle.

Honda did not import the Crossroad to North America, since their similarly sized Element took its place. Honda's crossover SUV lineup in the United States and Canada already has the Element, the mid-priced CR-V and the larger Pilot, as all three models are made in North America.

It was reported that Honda did not export the Crossroad to Europe because of a voluntary commitment by the Japan Automobile Manufacturers Association to reduce average CO_{2} emissions in its European fleet to 140 grams per kilometer by 2009. As a result, Honda was reluctant to offer larger vehicles without technological breakthrough.

On August 25, 2010, Honda announced the discontinuation of the Crossroad.

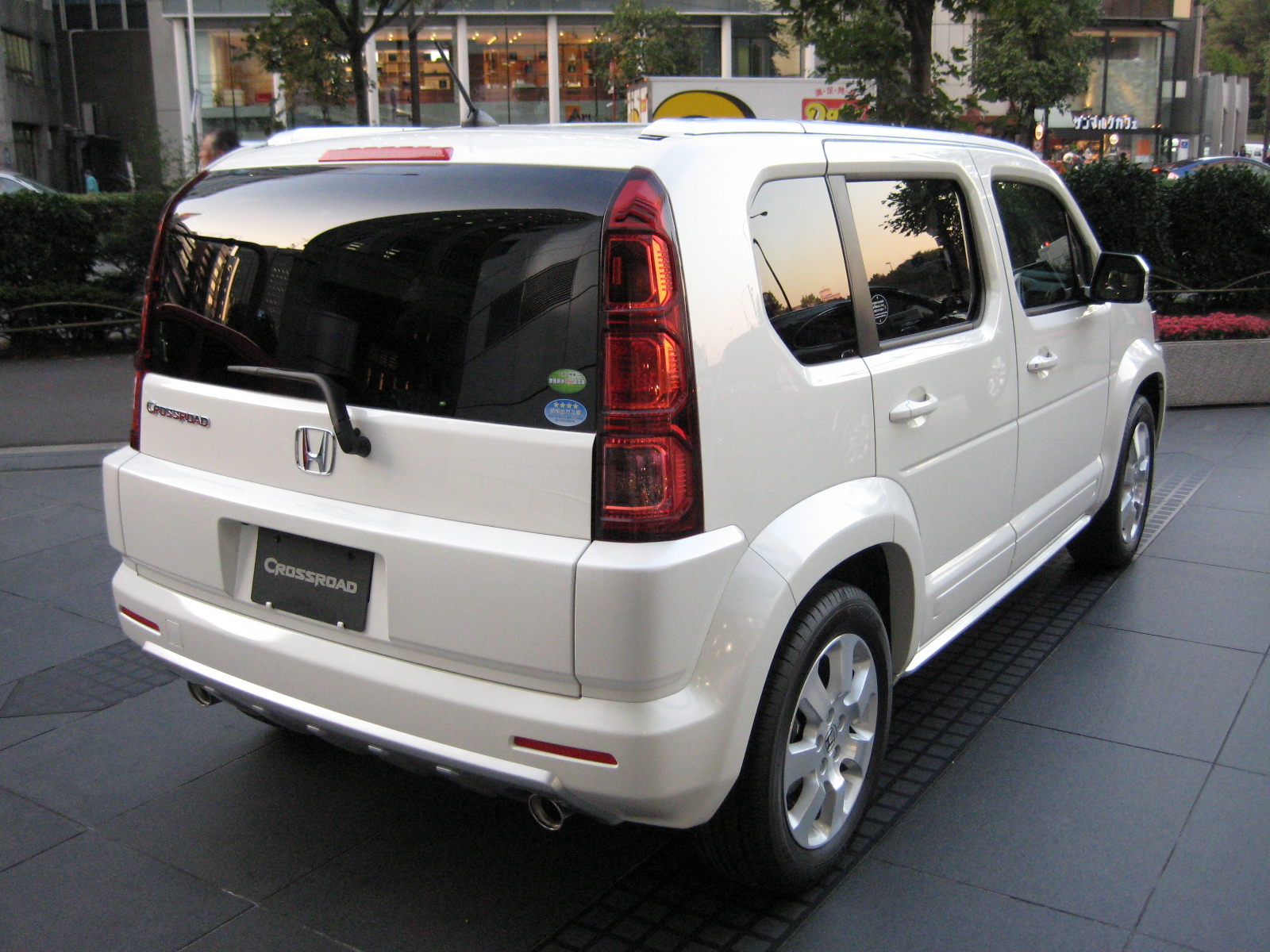
Rear view

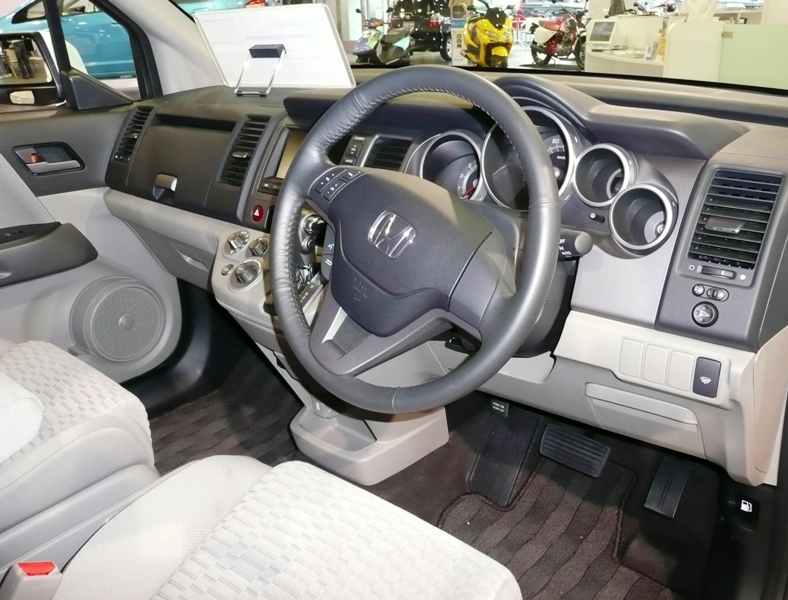
Interior
