= Honda CR-V (fourth generation) =

Compact crossover SUV manufactured by Honda

Honda CR-V (Fourth generation)
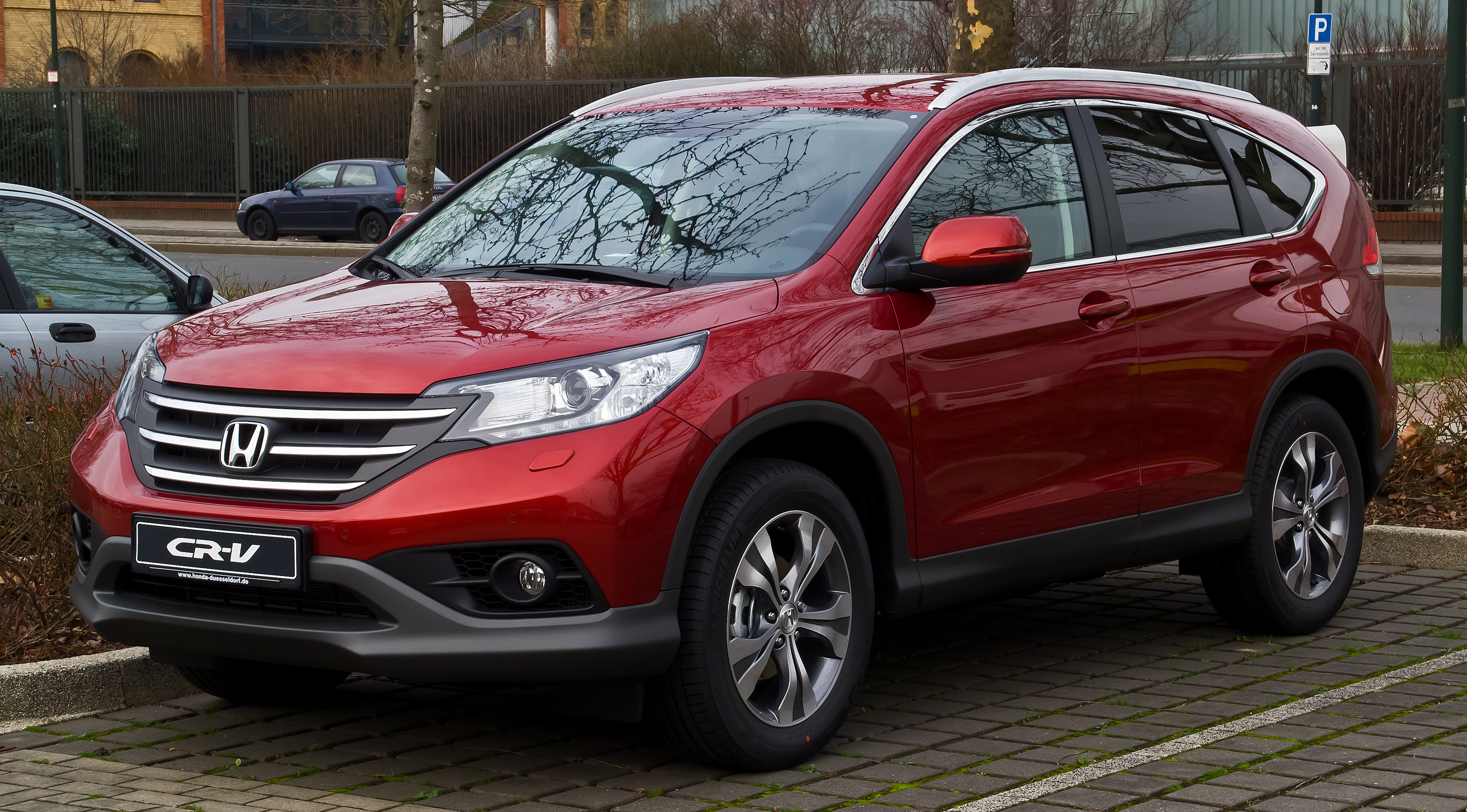

Overview
- Manufacturer: Honda
- Model code: RM1/2/3/4; RE5/6
- Production: November 2011 – 2018
- Model years: 2012–2016
- Assembly: Japan: Sayama, Saitama; United States: East Liberty, Ohio (ELAP); Canada: Alliston, Ontario (HCM); Mexico: El Salto, Jalisco (Honda de México); United Kingdom: Swindon (HUM); China: Wuhan (Dongfeng Honda); Taiwan: Pingtung City (Honda Taiwan); Thailand: Ayutthaya; Malaysia: Alor Gajah, Melaka; Indonesia: Karawang (HPM, September 2012-April 2017); India: Greater Noida (HCIL); Vietnam: Vĩnh Phúc
- Designer: Manabu Konaka and Seiji Takayama

Body and chassis
- Class: Compact crossover SUV
- Body style: 5-door SUV
- Layout: Front-engine, front-wheel-drive Front-engine, all-wheel-drive
- Platform: Honda C-5
- Related: Acura RDX; Honda Civic (ninth generation)

Powertrain
- Engine: Petrol: 2.0 L R20A I4; 2.4 L K24Z I4; 2.4 L K24W I4; Diesel: 1.6 L N16 I4 turbo; 2.2 L N22B I4 turbo
- Transmission: 6-speed manual 5-speed automatic CVT; 9-speed automatic (diesel)

Dimensions
- Wheelbase: 103.1 in (2,619 mm)
- Length: 178.3 in (4,529 mm)
- Width: 71.6 in (1,819 mm)
- Height: 65.1 in (1,654 mm)

Chronology
- Predecessor: Honda CR-V (third generation); Honda Crossroad (second generation)
- Successor: Honda CR-V (fifth generation)

The fourth-generation Honda CR-V is a compact crossover SUV manufactured by Honda from 2011 to 2018, replacing the third-generation CR-V. It debuted as a concept model called the CR-V Concept in Los Angeles, United States in September 2011, and went on sale in the country in December 2011. It was introduced in Japan in November 2011 and went on sale a month after.

== Markets ==
=== Asia ===
==== China ====
The fourth-generation CR-V was launched in China in February 2012.

==== India ====
In India, the fourth-generation CR-V was launched in February 2013 with 2 variants, a 2.0-litre petrol and a 2.4-litre, 185 bhp petrol. The 2.0-litre variant is equipped with a six-speed manual or a five-speed automatic gearbox. The 2.4-litre variant is offered with an automatic gearbox, Honda's on demand four-wheel-drive system and an ECON mode to increase fuel efficiency.

==== Indonesia ====
In Indonesia, the fourth-generation CR-V was launched by the official Indonesian distributor PT Honda Prospect Motor on September 13, 2012. There are 4 variants available: 2.0 L M/T, 2.0 L A/T, 2.4 L A/T and 2.4 L A/T Prestige. The 2.4 L A/T comes standard with 18-inch alloy wheels, fog lamps, chrome-plated door handles, dual-zone automatic climate control, leather seats, smart key, start-stop button, paddle shifters, brake assist, vehicle stability assist (VSA), hill-start assist and electric driver seat. The 2.4 L A/T Prestige comes with chrome fog lamp garnishes, muffler tips and navigation system with rear backup camera and parking sensor. All versions use front-wheel-drive configuration and RM3 chassis code.

It has side-mirror turning signals and projector headlights without daytime running lights (DRL) pre-installed despite the dedicated room for the LEDs at the bottom of the headlamp.

The facelifted fourth generation CR-V was launched in Indonesia on January 14, 2015. The 2.4L A/T Prestige Fender Audio variant was released in January 2016, featuring improved audio equipment from Fender.

==== Japan ====
In Japan, the fourth-generation CR-V was launched on November 28, 2011 and has been on sale since December 2, 2011. The Japan-spec 2012 CR-V is offered in 2.0 L and 2.4 L variants. The 2.0 L variant is mated with continuously variable transmission with torque converter that has the same off-the-line acceleration and overall acceleration performance as the 2.4 L model. The 2.0 L variant is only available in front-wheel drive; the 2.4 L variant is available in four-wheel drive model only and equipped with a 5-speed automatic transmission. It was discontinued in Japan in August 2016.

==== Malaysia ====
The fourth-generation CR-V has been launched in Malaysia in three engine options such as – 2.0-litre 2WD, 2.0-litre 4WD and 2.4-litre 4WD. The 2WD trim is powered by five-speed automatic transmission that powers the front wheels. Whereas, the AWD trim sends power to the rear wheels when required. The top-of-the-line 2.4-litre AWD trim is mated to a 5-speed automatic transmission that is capable of generating about 188 bhp of power with 222 Nm of torque output.

==== Philippines ====
In the Philippines, the fourth-generation CR-V was launched in early 2012 and is available in 3 trim levels. The 2.0 V which is the base model available with either 6-speed manual or 5-speed automatic transmission, no fog lights, no side side turning lights, has halogen type headlights and shark fin antenna and LED tail lights. 2.0 S ranging from the top it has fog lights and mirror with side turning lights fabric seats (also available for the 2.0 V) and the top-of-the-line 2.4 SX comes with 4X4 terrain, new alloy wheel design, leather seats, chrome door handles, HID headlights and smart key with push start/stop engine. All models receives reverse camera and ECON button. In early 2015, a facelift version for the CR-V has come, all models now receives DRL or daytime running lights, garnished lower bumper front and back, new chromed tailgate and redesigned front headlamps. 3 trim levels are still available, the 2.0 V available with either manual or automatic transmission, cruise control, ECON button, reverse camera and rear air conditioning vents, the 2.0 S comes with automatic transmission, fog lights, smart key with push start button, paddle shifters and VSA. The 2.4 SX is the top-of-the-line model comes with lane watching camera, navigation system, auto sensing wipers and four-wheel-drive.

==== Thailand ====
In Thailand, the fourth-generation CR-V was launched in September 2012. It is offered in 2.4 EL 4WD, 2.0 E 4WD and 2.0 S 2WD trim levels. They are all mated to a five-speed automatic transmission. The 2.4 EL comes standard with 18-inch alloy wheels, Smart Entry and Start System, Navigation, HID projector headlamps and rain-sensing wipers.

==== Vietnam ====
The CR-V, together with Honda City, were Honda's top sellers in the country in 2014.

=== Europe ===
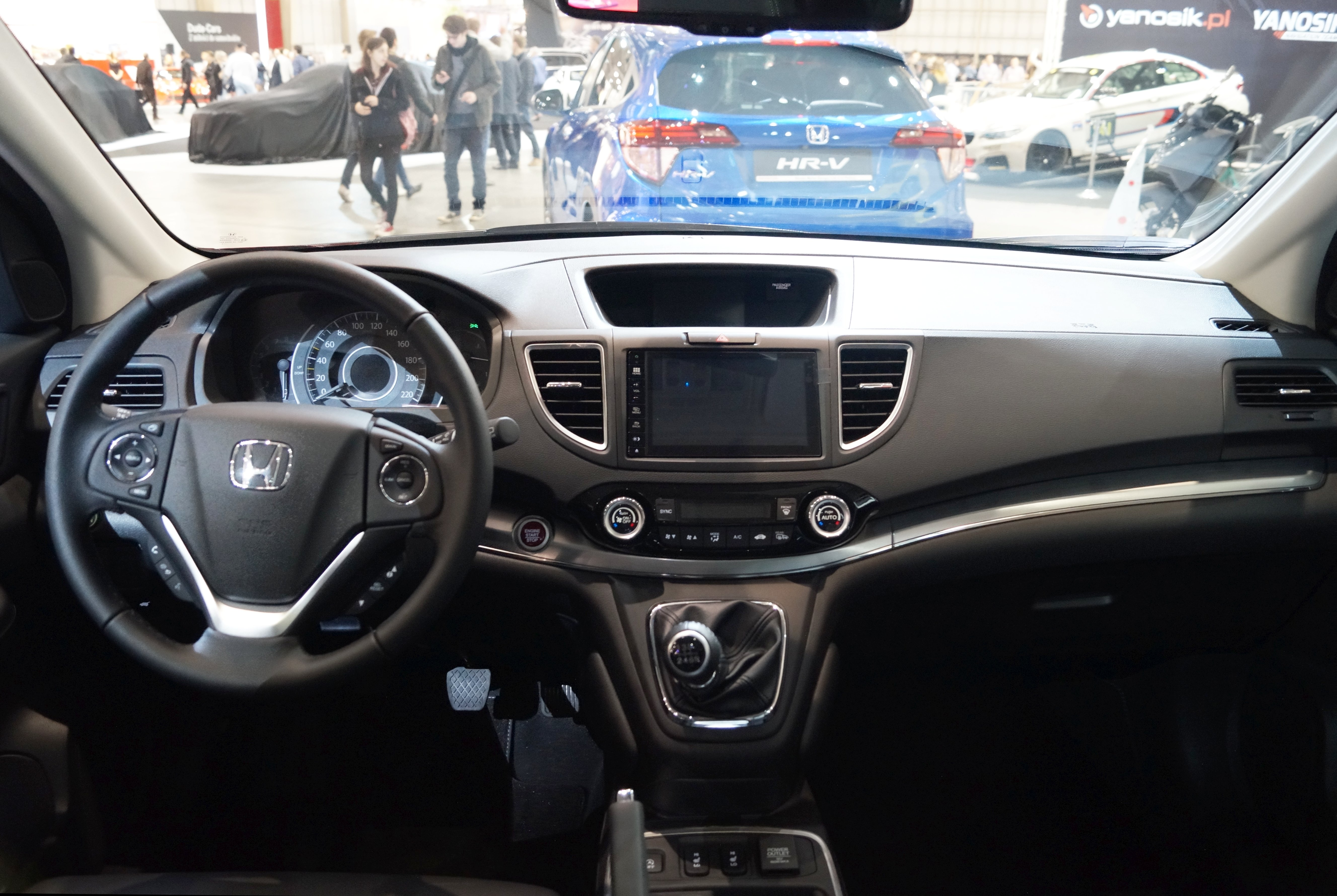
Interior

Honda introduced the 2015 model in the first quarter of 2015. Three engines are available: 1.6 i-DTEC (diesel) producing either 120 PS (88 kW) power and 300 Nm torque (2WD) or 160 PS (116 kW) power and 350 Nm torque (4WD) (replacing the N22B 2.2 i-DTEC unit paired with the 5-speed automatic gearbox and 150 PS, that was used between 2012 and 2015); and 2.0 i-VTEC (petrol) producing 155 PS (114 kW) power and 192 Nm torque (both 2WD and 4WD). Three gearboxes are available: 6-speed manual (petrol and diesel), 5-speed automatic (petrol) and 9-speed automatic (diesel).

=== North America ===
The CR-V Concept debuted at the Orange County International Auto Show in September 2011, the production 2012 CR-V debuted at the 2011 Los Angeles Auto Show. The CR-V went on sale in the U.S. on December 15, 2011.

It is powered with a 2.4-litre i-VTEC inline-four engine that puts out 185 hp and 163 pound-feet (220 Nm) of torque at 4,400 rpm along with an all-new Real-Time all-wheel-drive (AWD) with intelligent control system. All North American CR-Vs come equipped with a 5-speed automatic transmission. Front-wheel-drive CR-Vs now get 23 mpg in the city and 31 mpg on the highway, while models with the optional Real-Time all-wheel-drive are rated at 22 mpg and 30 mpg, respectively.

==== 2014 facelift ====
The facelifted CR-V went on sale during October 2014 for the 2015 model year. The CR-V uses the direct injected "Earth Dreams" engine and continuously variable transmission (CVT) combination first introduced on the ninth generation Accord, EPA estimated fuel economy is improved +4/+3/+3 mpg (city/highway/combined). The structure has been modified to improve crash performance, particularly in the IIHS's small offset crash test. The suspension shock absorbers, springs, anti-roll bars and lower control arms are also revised to improve ride performance, while a reduced 15.6:1 steering gear ratio and larger brake booster gives it a sportier feel.

The EX-L with the Rear Seat Entertainment option was discontinued in 2014 for the 2015 model year. A new "Touring" trim supplants the "EX-L w/Navigation" trim level as the top trim level and adds Forward Collision Warning (FCW) with Collision Mitigation Braking System (CMBS), Lane Departure Warning (LDW) with Lane Keeping Assist System (LKAS) and Adaptive Cruise Control (ACC) along with a power tailgate, power seat and side mirror memory, projector headlamps and integrated turn signal side mirrors. The interior has been upgraded for a more upscale look with Honda's Lane Watch passenger side mirror camera now standard (on EX and above trims) as well as newly available exterior LED daytime running light headlamps.

Pre-facelift (2011–2014)

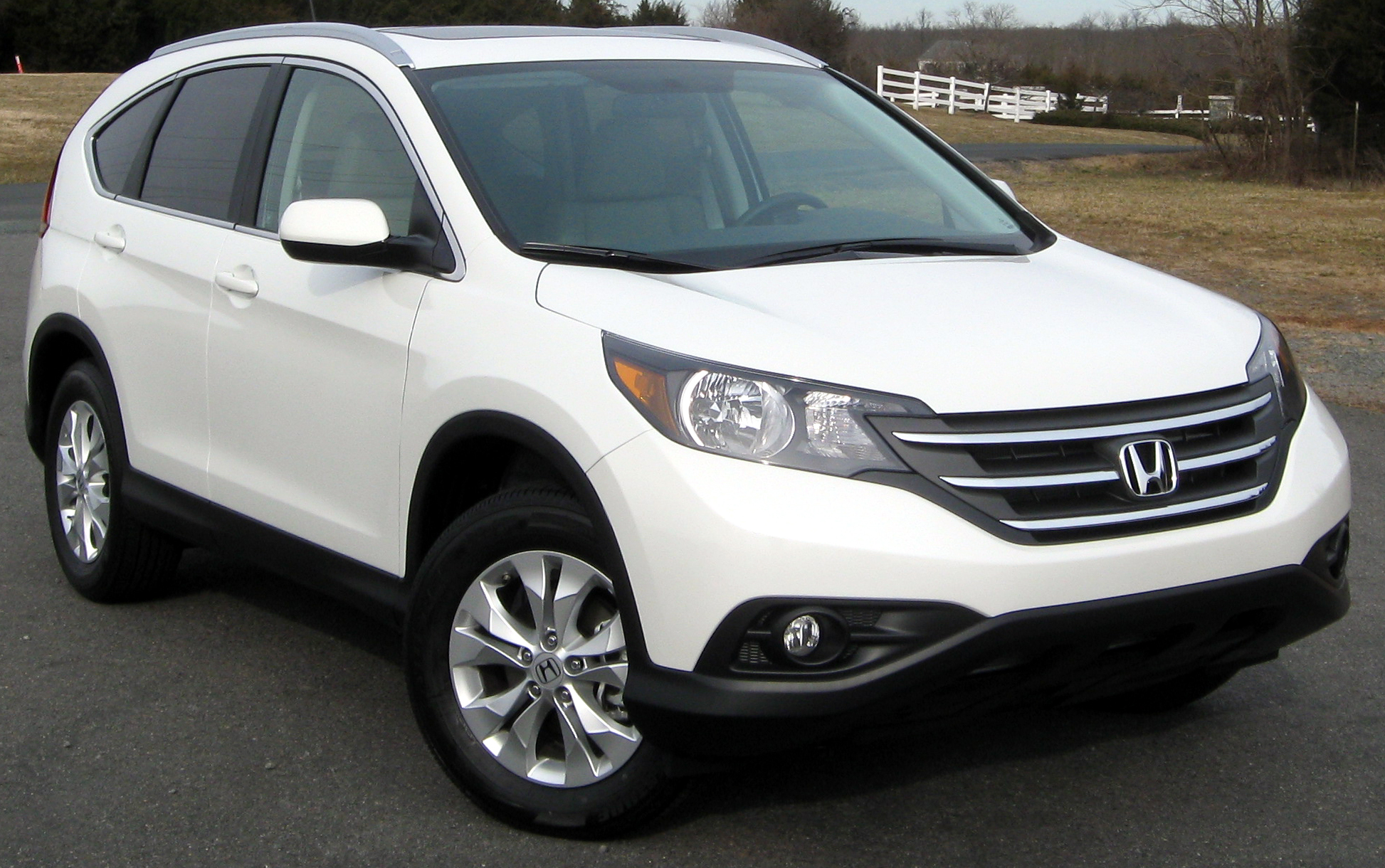
Front (EX-L)

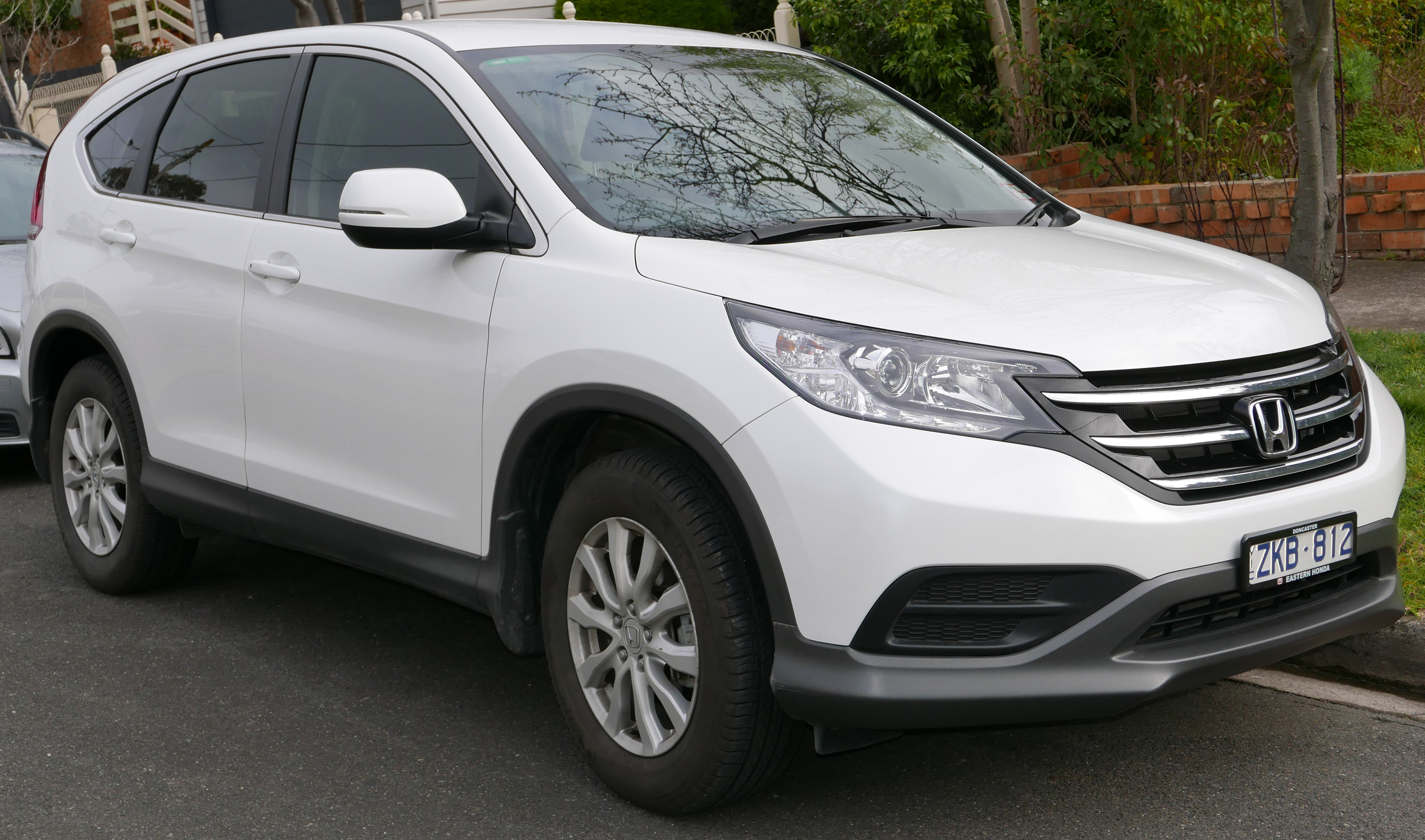
Front (VTi)

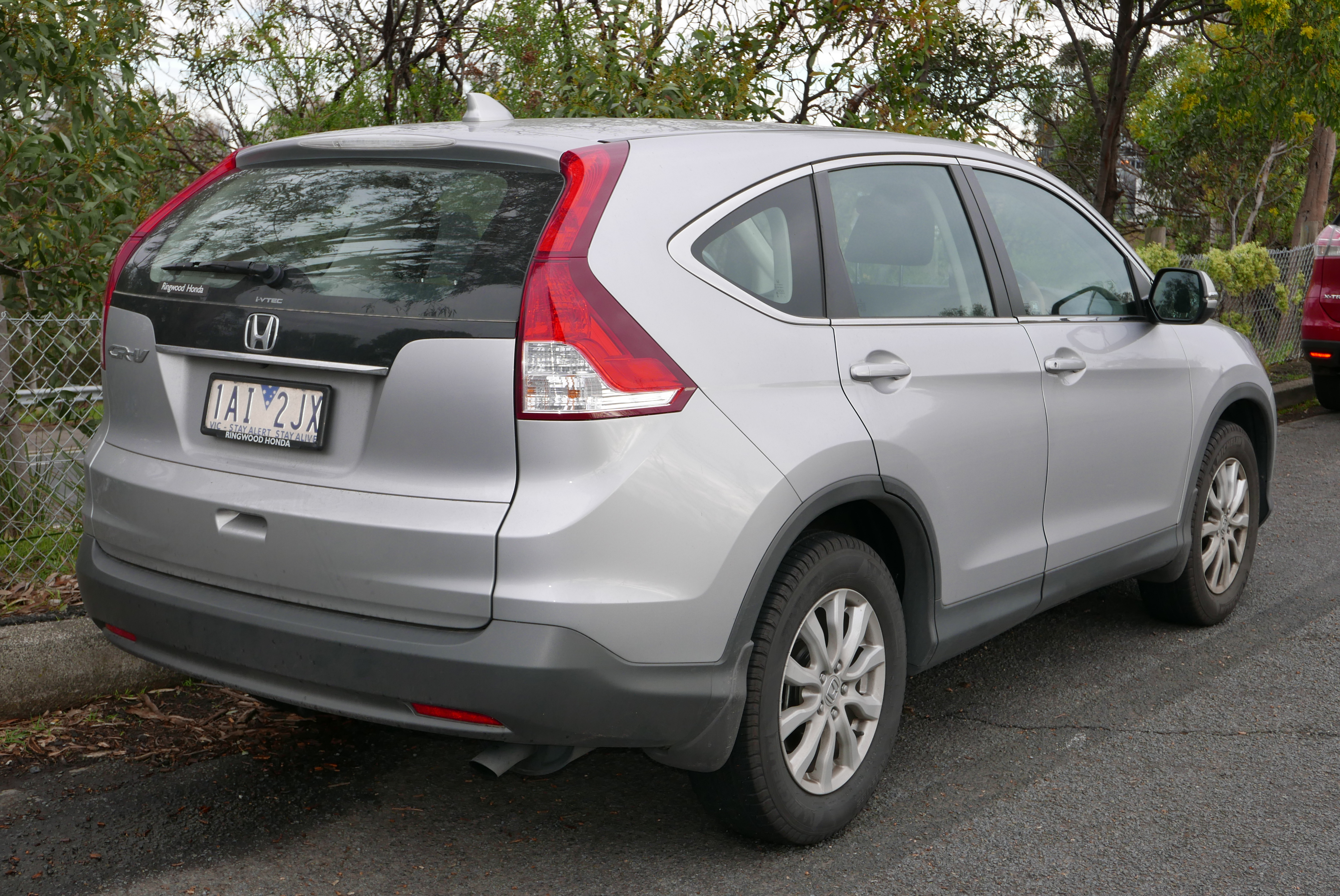
Rear (VTi)

Post-facelift (2014–2018)

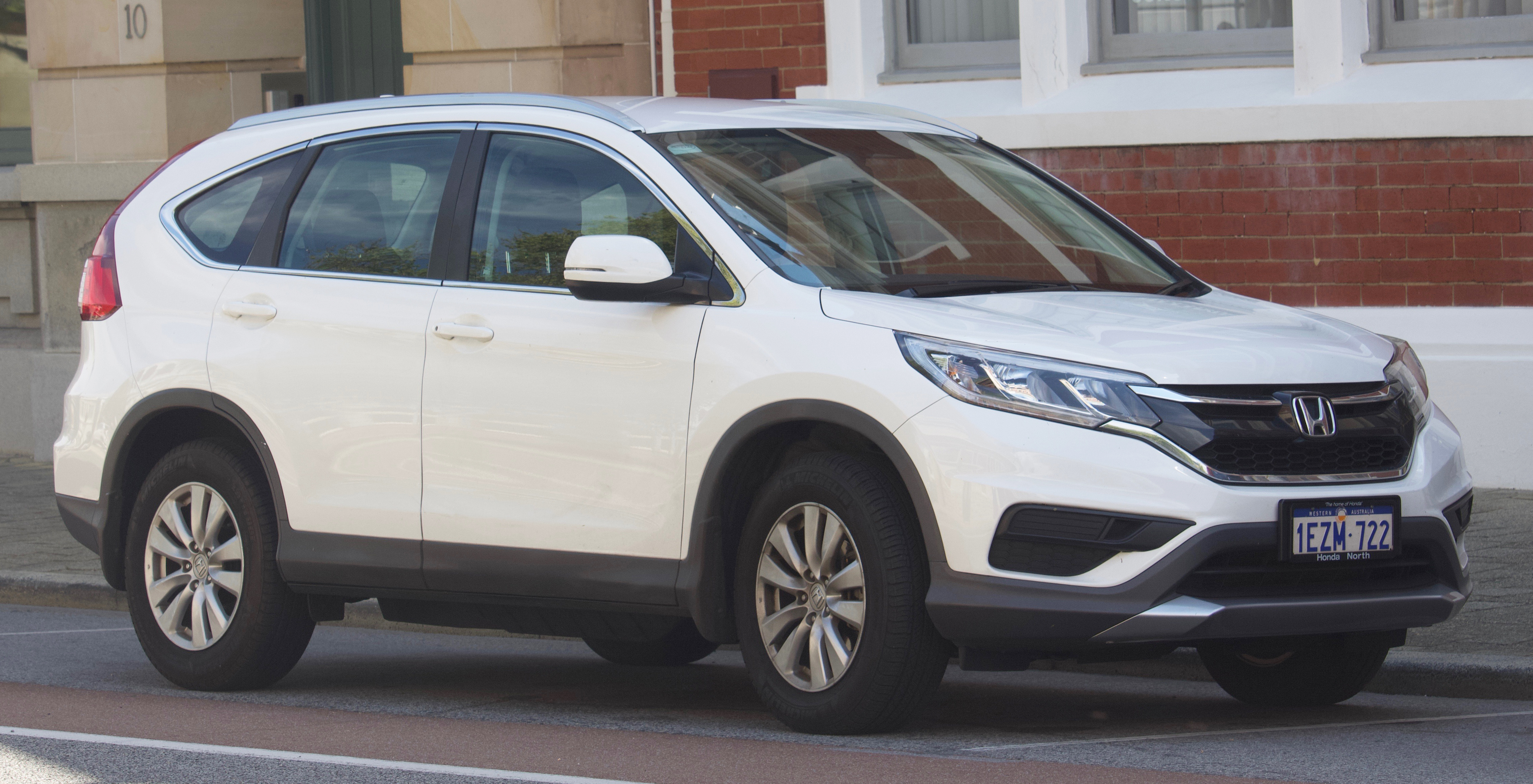
Front (VTi)

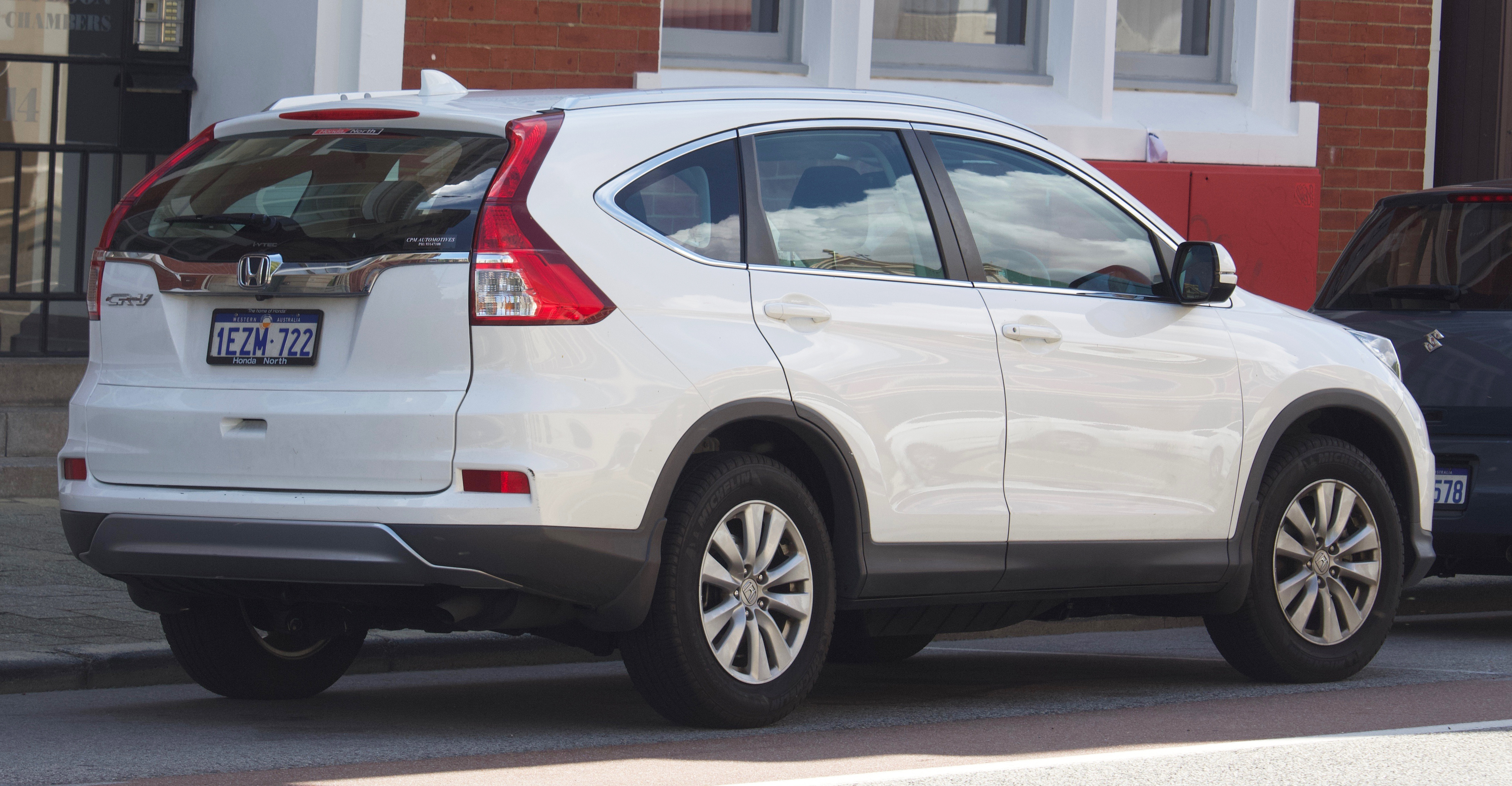
Rear (VTi)

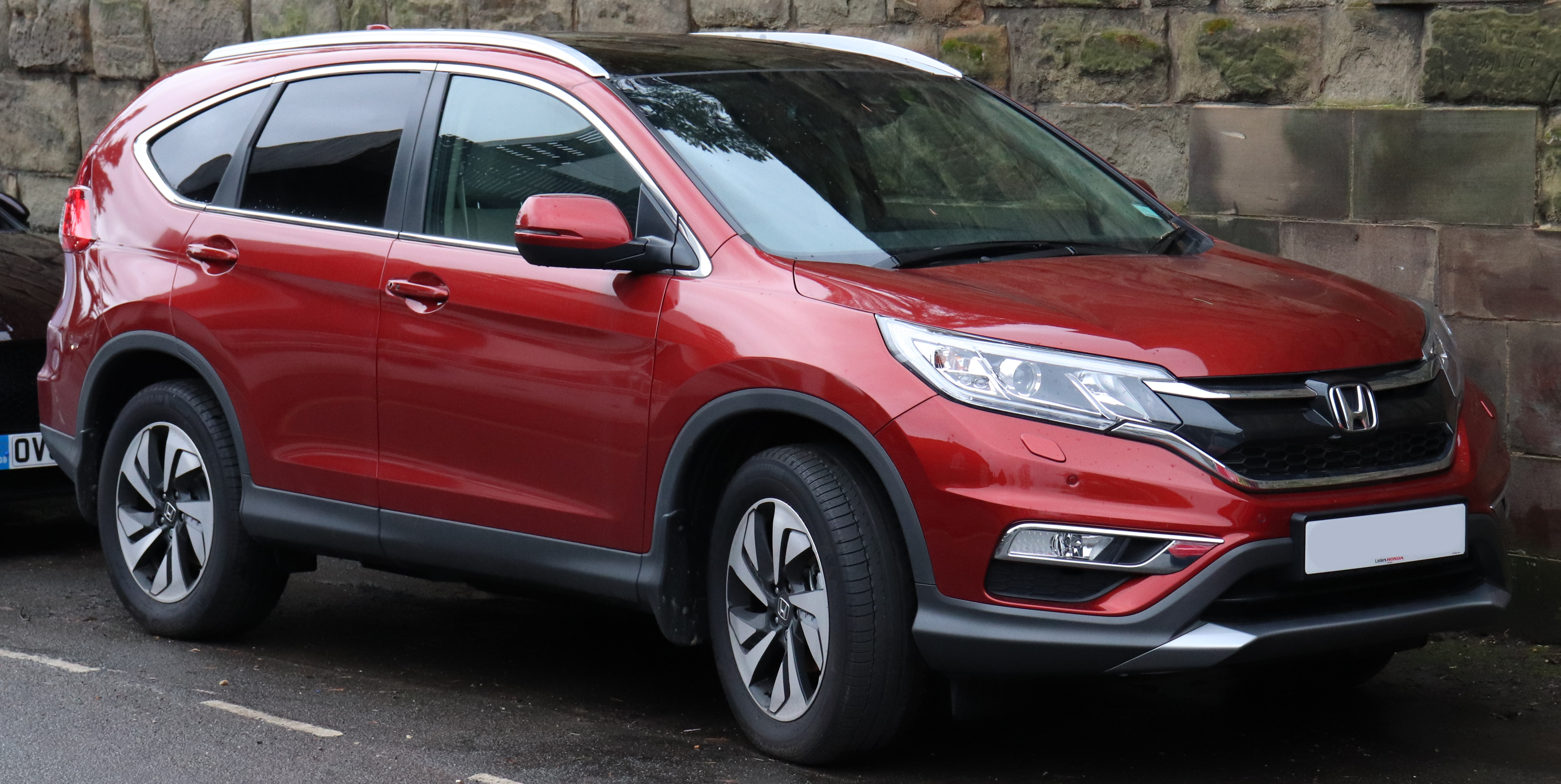
Front (EX)

== Marketing ==
To promote the vehicle during Super Bowl XLVI, Honda brought in Matthew Broderick for their commercial, which pays homage to his 1986 film Ferris Bueller's Day Off. The commercial ties into Honda's "Leap List" campaign for the CR-V. The company also released an extended version video.

== Engine ==
Chassis code	Engine	Power	Torque
Petrol engines
RM1 (FWD)	2.0 L I4 i-VTEC R20A (JDM spec)	150 PS (110 kW; 148 hp) @ 6,200 rpm	191 N⋅m (141 lb⋅ft) @ 4,300 rpm
RM1 (FWD); RM2 (AWD)	2.0 L I4 i-VTEC R20A6	155 PS (114 kW; 153 hp) @ 6,500 rpm	190 N⋅m (140 lb⋅ft) @ 4,300 rpm
RE5 (FWD/AWD)	2.0 L I4 i-VTEC R20A9	155 PS (114 kW; 153 hp) @ 6,500 rpm	190 N⋅m (140 lb⋅ft) @ 4,300 rpm
RM4 (AWD)	2.4 L I4 i-VTEC K24A (JDM spec)	190 PS (140 kW; 187 hp) @ 7,000 rpm	222 N⋅m (164 lb⋅ft) @ 4,400 rpm
RM3 (FWD); RM4 (AWD)	2.4 L I4 i-VTEC K24Z7	187 PS (138 kW; 184 hp) @ 7,000 rpm	221 N⋅m (163 lb⋅ft) @ 4,400 rpm
RM3 (FWD); RM4 (AWD)	2.4 L I4 i-VTEC K24Y1	170 PS (125 kW; 168 hp) @ 6,000 rpm	220 N⋅m (160 lb⋅ft) @ 4,300 rpm
RM3 (FWD); RM4 (AWD)	2.4 L I4 i-VTEC Earth Dreams K24W9	187 PS (138 kW; 184 hp) @ 6,400 rpm	245 N⋅m (181 lb⋅ft) @ 3,900 rpm
RM3 (FWD); RM4 (AWD)	2.4 L I4 i-VTEC Earth Dreams K24V5	175 PS (129 kW; 173 hp) @ 6,200 rpm	224 N⋅m (165 lb⋅ft) @ 4,000 rpm
Diesel engine
RE6 (FWD/AWD)	2.2 L i-DTEC Turbo N22B4	150 PS (110 kW; 148 hp) @ 4,000 rpm	350 N⋅m (260 lb⋅ft) @ 2,000 rpm
RE6 (FWD/AWD)	1.6 L i-DTEC Turbo Earth Dreams N16A2	120 PS (88 kW; 118 hp) @ 4,000 rpm	300 N⋅m (220 lb⋅ft) @ 2,000 rpm
RE6 (FWD/AWD)	1.6 L i-DTEC Turbo Earth Dreams N16A4	160 PS (118 kW; 158 hp) @ 4,000 rpm	350 N⋅m (260 lb⋅ft) @ 2,000 rpm

== Safety ==
The CR-V utilizes Honda's Advanced Compatibility Engineering front structure, the structure was upgraded during the mid-cycle refresh. All CR-V models come standard with a rear-view backup camera.

=== ANCAP ===
ANCAP test results Honda CR-V (2012)
Test	Score
Overall	5 /5 stars
Frontal offset	14.91/16
Side impact	16/16
Pole	2/2
Seat belt reminders	3/3
Whiplash protection	Good
Pedestrian protection	Marginal
Electronic stability control	Standard

=== NHTSA ===
2016 NHTSA	
Overall:	5/5 stars
Frontal – Driver:	5/5 stars
Frontal – Passenger:	5/5 stars
Side – Driver:	5/5 stars
Side – Passenger:	5/5 stars
Side Pole – Driver:	5/5 stars
Rollover:	/ 17.4 %

2012 NHTSA scores
Overall:	5/5 stars
Frontal Driver:	4/5 stars
Frontal Passenger:	5/5 stars
Side Driver:	5/5 stars
Side Passenger:	5/5 stars
Side Pole Driver:	5/5 stars
Rollover:	/ 17.4%

=== Euro NCAP ===
Euro NCAP test results Honda CRV 2.2 diesel SE, RHD (2013)
Test	Points	%
Overall:	5 /5 stars	
Adult occupant:	37	93%
Child occupant:	37	74%
Pedestrian:	25	68%
Safety assist:	6	66%

=== IIHS ===
IIHS scores
Moderate overlap frontal offset	Good
Driver small overlap frontal offset (2012–14)	Marginal
Driver small overlap frontal offset (2015–16)	Good^{1}
Passenger small overlap frontal offset (2015–16)	Acceptable
Side impact	Good
Roof strength	Good^{2}

^{1} vehicle structure rated "Good"
^{2} strength-to-weight ratio: 5.08

=== ASEAN NCAP ===
ASEAN NCAP test results Honda CR-V (2014)
Test	Points	Stars
Adult occupant:	15.46	5 /5 stars
Child occupant:	86%	4 /5 stars
Safety assist:	NA	
