= Honda CR-V (third generation) =

Compact crossover SUV manufactured by Honda

Honda CR-V Third generation (RE1–RE5, RE7)
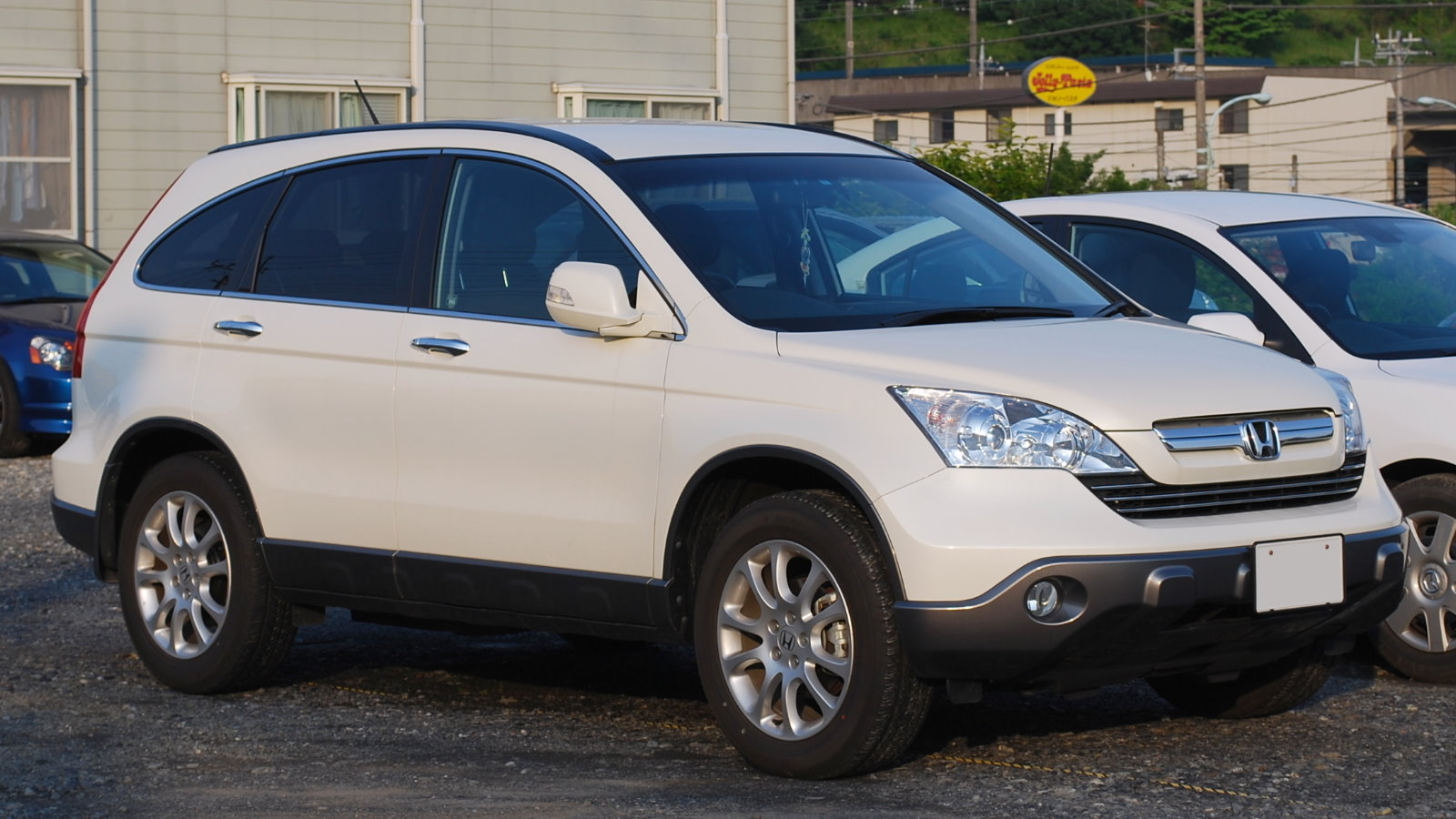

Overview
- Manufacturer: Honda
- Production: 2006–2012
- Model years: 2007–2011 (US)
- Assembly: Japan: Sayama, Saitama; United States: East Liberty, Ohio (ELAP); Mexico: El Salto, Jalisco; United Kingdom: Swindon (HUKM); China: Wuhan (Dongfeng Honda); Taiwan: Pingtung; Vietnam: Vĩnh Phúc; Thailand: Ayutthaya; Malaysia: Melaka; Indonesia: Karawang (HPM, January 2007-September 2012); India: Greater Noida (HCIL)
- Designer: Daisuke Sawai, Naoya Ishikura and Deane James

Body and chassis
- Class: Compact crossover SUV
- Body style: 5-door SUV
- Layout: Front-engine, front-wheel-drive Front-engine, four-wheel-drive
- Related: Acura RDX (first generation); Honda Civic (eighth generation); Honda Element

Powertrain
- Engine: Petrol: 2.0 L R20A I4; 2.4 L K24Z I4; Diesel: 2.2 L N22A turbo I4
- Transmission: 6-speed manual 5-speed automatic

Dimensions
- Wheelbase: 2,620 mm (103.1 in)
- Length: 4,518 mm (177.9 in)
- Width: 1,819–1,820 mm (71.6–71.7 in)
- Height: 1,704 mm (67.1 in)

Chronology
- Predecessor: Honda CR-V (second generation)
- Successor: Honda CR-V (fourth generation)

The third generation Honda CR-V was launched in 2006 for the 2007 model year. It went on sale in the U.S. during late September 2006. Unlike preceding models, it features a rear liftgate rather than a side-opening rear door and no longer has the spare tire mounted on the rear door. The new CR-V is lower, wider and shorter than the previous models; the length decrease is attributed mostly to the fact that the spare wheel no longer adds length to the back of the vehicle. A lowering of the centre of gravity is another benefit of the spare wheel being located underneath the rear cargo area. The centre rear seat pass-through was also introduced as a new feature on the third generation.

The third generation CR-V is powered by the latest version of Honda's standard K-series 2.4 L inline-four engine, similar variants were also found in the Honda Accord and Honda Element. In North American markets, this engine's power is rated at 166 hp (168 PS; 124 kW) at 5,800 rpm and 161 lb⋅ft (218 N⋅m) at 4,200 rpm. A 2.2 L i-CTDI diesel engine was offered in the European and Asian markets. The European market CR-V had the R20A 2.0 L petrol engine, based on the Honda R-series i-VTEC SOHC engine found in the Honda Civic, as opposed to the previous CR-V offering the K20A.

Honda offered an integrated Navigation as option only on the top-tier EX-L model. The navigation unit was made for Honda by Alpine and includes voice activated control, XM radio in the US and Canada, and an in-dash CD player that can play MP3 and Windows Media Audio. The media offerings also included a six-disc CD changer in the centre console and a PC Card (PCMCIA) slot in the Navigation unit for flash memory MP3 or WMA files. A second CD player is positioned behind the navigation screen, which plays MP3/WMA CDs. A rear backup camera was also included.

An iPod adapter was to be an available option on US models, but was only available as an add-on accessory. All CR-V models retained the auxiliary audio input jack, which is either on the head unit itself (LX), on the central tray (EX) or inside the centre console (all versions of the EX-L, with or without navigation).

== Sales and production ==
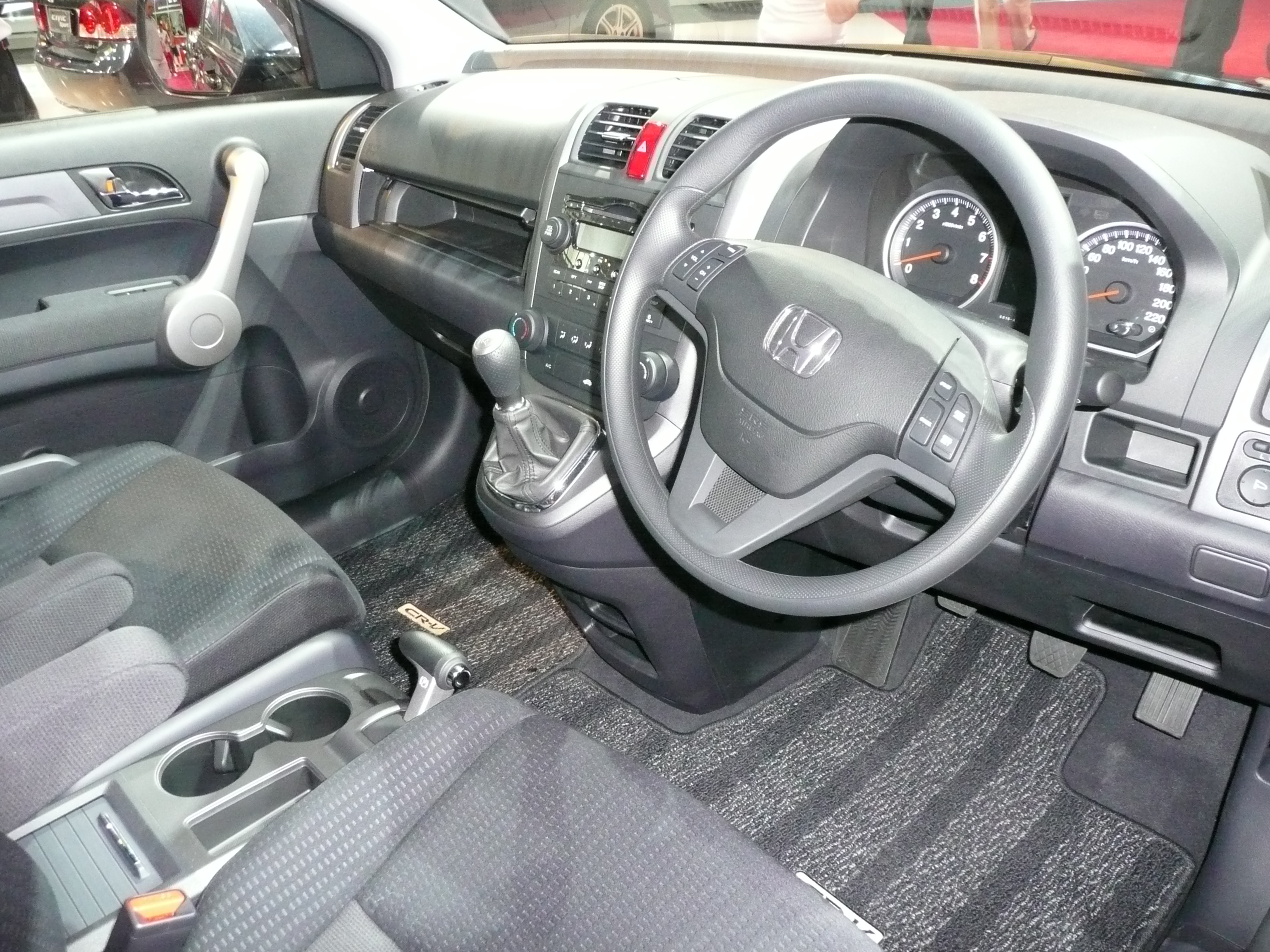
Interior

For 2007, Honda CR-V became one of the ten best selling vehicles of the year. It overtook Ford Explorer, which had held the title for fifteen years (1991–2006), to be the best selling SUV in the US. In Canada, the CR-V was the second best selling SUV in 2007, behind the Ford Escape.

To meet demand, Honda shifted some Civic production from East Liberty, Ohio to Alliston Plant #2, Ontario (where some Pilot, Ridgeline and Odyssey production was located until production was consolidated at Honda's Lincoln, Alabama facility) to free up space for additional CR-V production. Currently, the East Liberty plant is building 400 CR-V models a day for the Canadian and US markets. The U.S. market CR-V models are imported primarily from Sayama, Saitama, Japan and El Salto, Jalisco, Mexico in increasing numbers. In 2008, CR-V continued to be top ten bestseller and best selling SUV of the year in the U.S. Between 1997 and 2000, Honda CR-V sales rose from 66,000 to 123,000 in the U.S. and from 8,000 to 17,000 in Canada, highlighting the model's growing appeal in North America.

Chassis code: RE1 (2WD), RE2 (4WD), RE3 (2WD), RE4 (4WD), RE5 (4WD), RE6 (4WD), RE7 (4WD)

== Safety ==
2008 National Highway Traffic Safety Administration (NHTSA) Crash Test Ratings

Frontal Impact:

Side Impact:

Rollover:

All models came standard with Vehicle Stability Assist. The Honda CR-V was rated "good" in frontal and side-impact crash tests by the IIHS. However it was rated "marginal" in the roof strength test. An analysis conducted by the IIHS and released in June 2011, found that the 2007-08 MY CR-V had the lowest fatality rate in its class and among the lowest fatality rates among all vehicles.

ANCAP test results Honda CR-V variant(s) as tested (2007)
Test	Score
Overall	4 /5 stars
Frontal offset	12.25/16
Side impact	16/16
Pole	2/2
Seat belt reminders	1/3
Whiplash protection	Not Assessed
Pedestrian protection	Marginal
Electronic stability control	Standard

== EPA fuel economy ratings ==
Since the introduction of a newer, five-speed automatic transmission, which sports a higher MPG rating and smoother shifting, the manual transmission was dropped from the US market. Fuel economy ratings from the EPA are 20 mpg_{‑US} (12 L/100 km; 24 mpg_{‑imp}) city, 26 mpg_{‑US} (9.0 L/100 km; 31 mpg_{‑imp}) highway. Consumer Reports rates fuel economy as 19 mpg_{‑US} (12 L/100 km; 23 mpg_{‑imp}) city, 29 mpg_{‑US} (8.1 L/100 km; 35 mpg_{‑imp}) highway.

== 2009 facelift ==
In September 2009, for the 2010 model year, the CR-V received style, powertrain and equipment changes. The exterior changes included a redesigned front fascia with a new horizontal-slat chrome grille and honeycomb-designed lower front grille, new front bumper, and revised tail lights. The rear bumper was redesigned, as well as new five split-spoke 17-inch alloy wheels for EX and EX-L models. The interior received minor changes, including seat fabrics, as well as wider driver and front-passenger armrests. The audio head unit controls were altered and the information display backlighting in the gauges was changed to blue, instead of the previous black. A USB audio input became standard in the EX-L trim while hands-free Bluetooth connectivity was exclusive to the EX-L trim equipped with navigation system. In 2011, a mid-level SE trim debuted with a 6-disc CD changer and 17-inch 7-spoke alloy wheels that came from the pre-facelift EX and EX-L trims.

Power was increased from 166 to 180 hp (168 to 182 PS; 124 to 134 kW) for 2010 and mileage improved by 1 mile per US gallon (240 L/100 km; 1.2 mpg_{‑imp}) for both front-wheel and all-wheel drive models. The EPA ratings were 21 miles per US gallon (11 L/100 km; 25 mpg_{‑imp}) / 28 miles per US gallon (8.4 L/100 km; 34 mpg_{‑imp}) city/highway and 21 miles per US gallon (11 L/100 km; 25 mpg_{‑imp}) / 27 miles per US gallon (8.7 L/100 km; 32 mpg_{‑imp}) city/highway respectively. Recommended oil weight changed from 5W-20 to 0W-20 from previous years with a change to the K24Z6 engine.

The 2010 model year update went on sale in the United States in September 2009.

Pre-facelift (2006 - 2009)

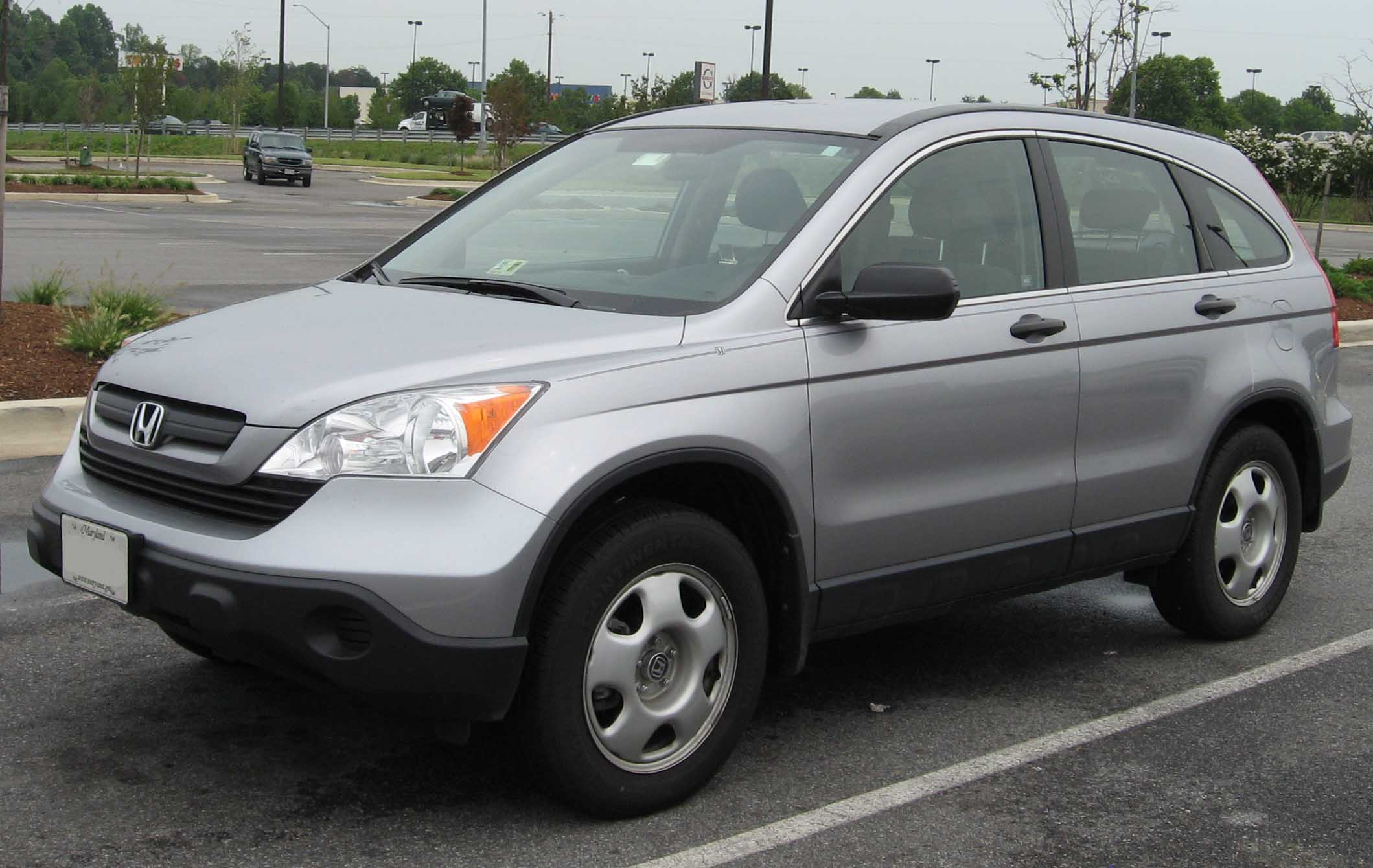
Front (LX)

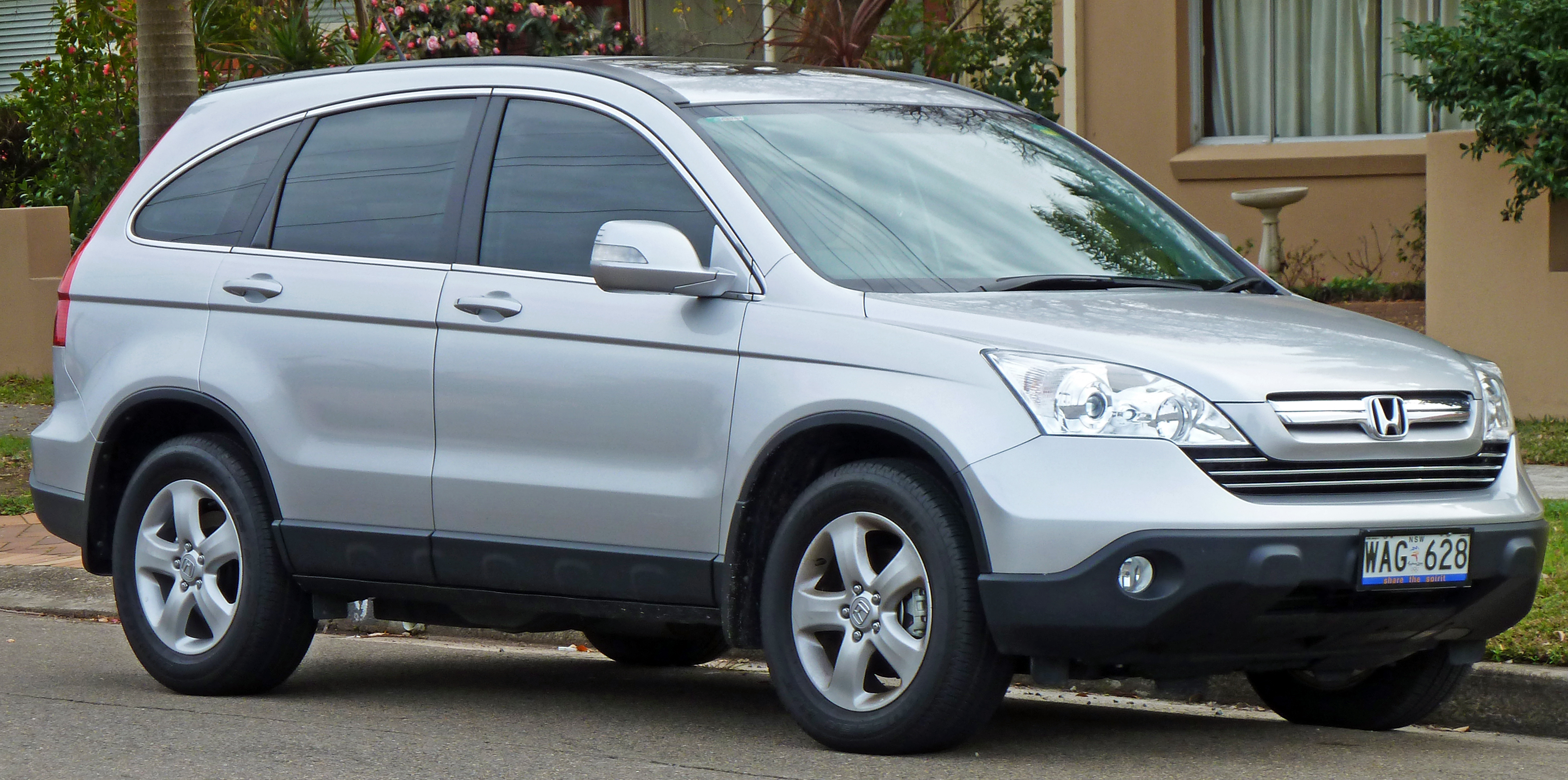
Front (Sport)

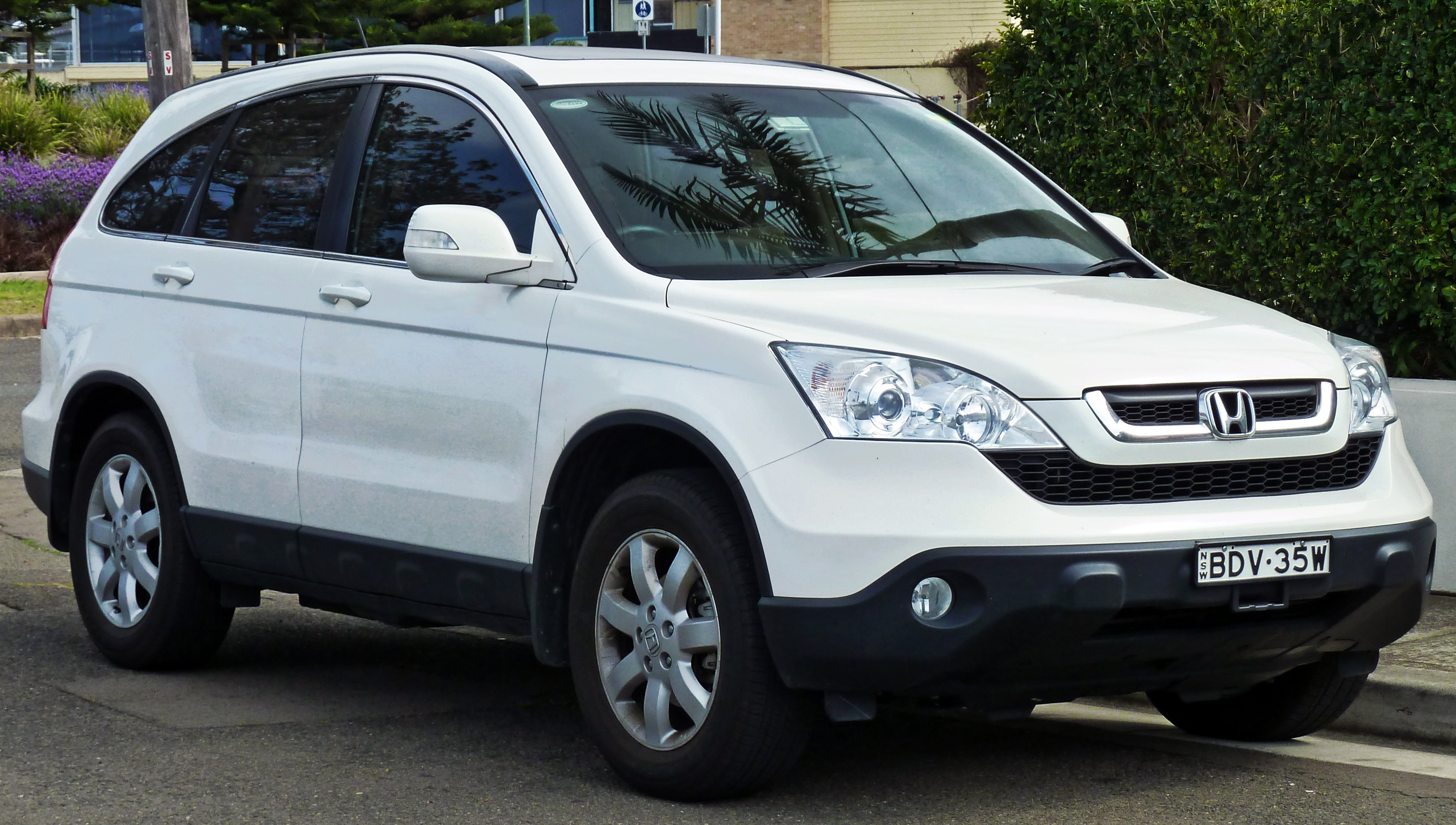
Front (Luxury)

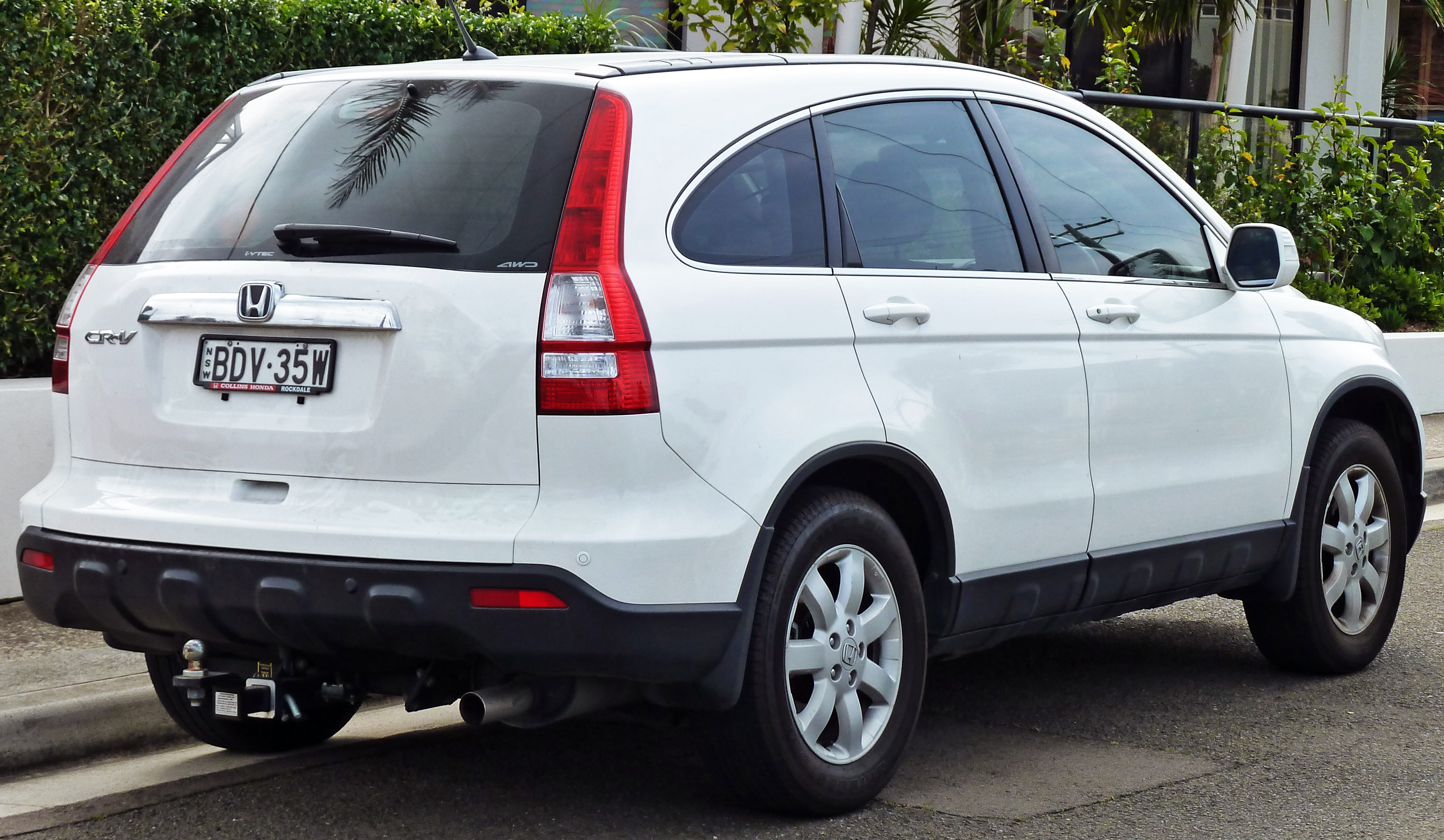
Rear (Luxury)

Post-facelift (2009 - 2012)

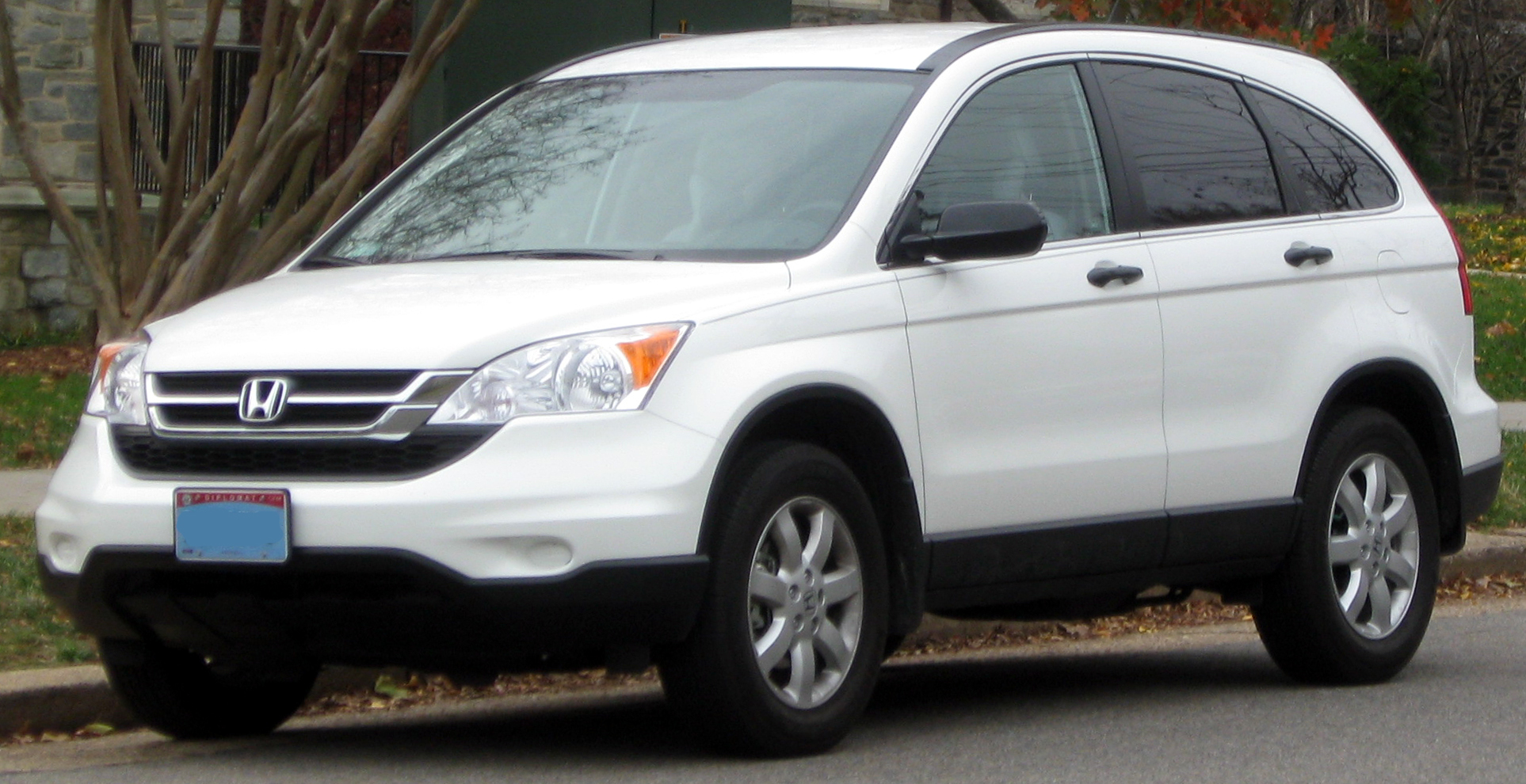
Front (EX)

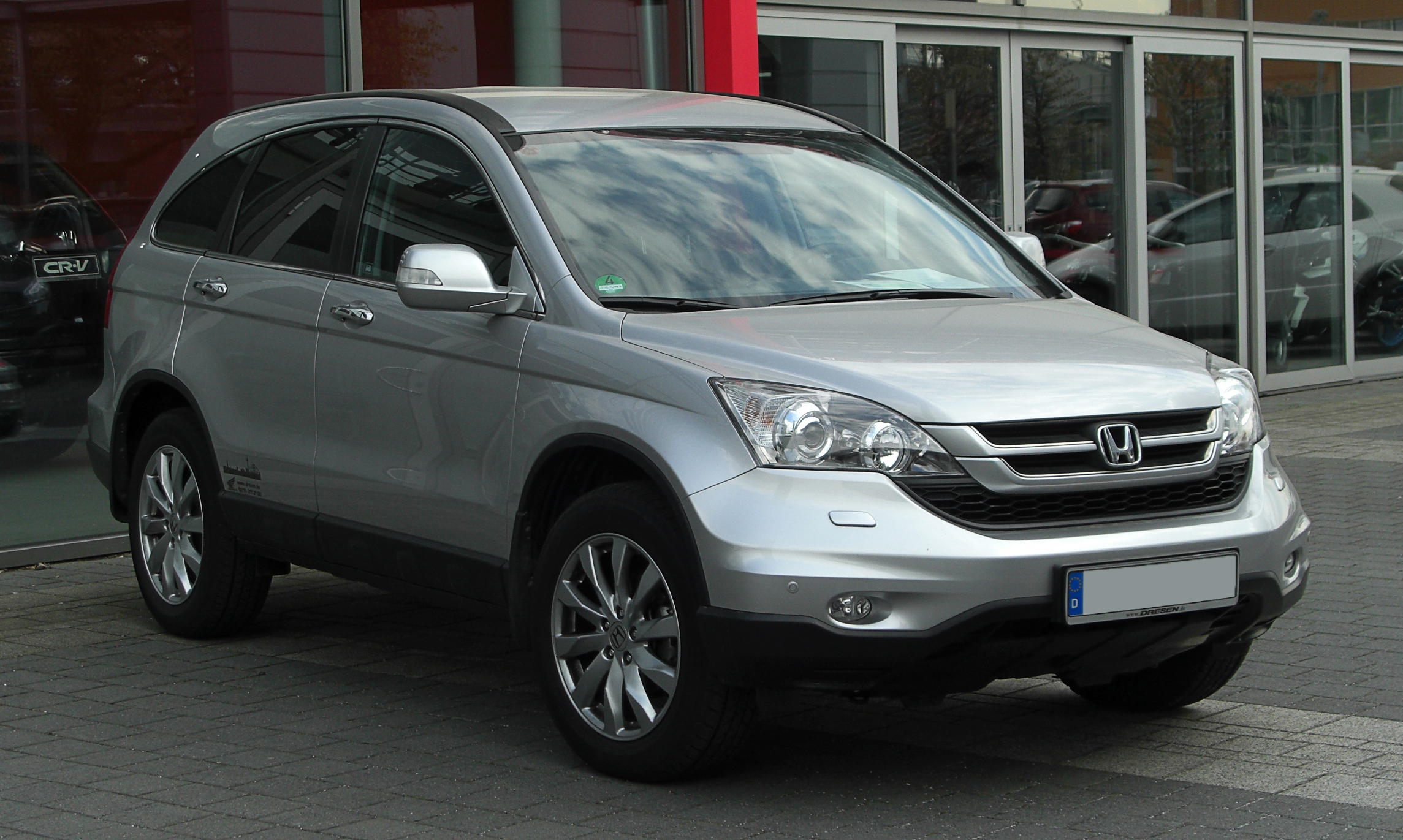
Front (2.0 Elegance Lifestyle)

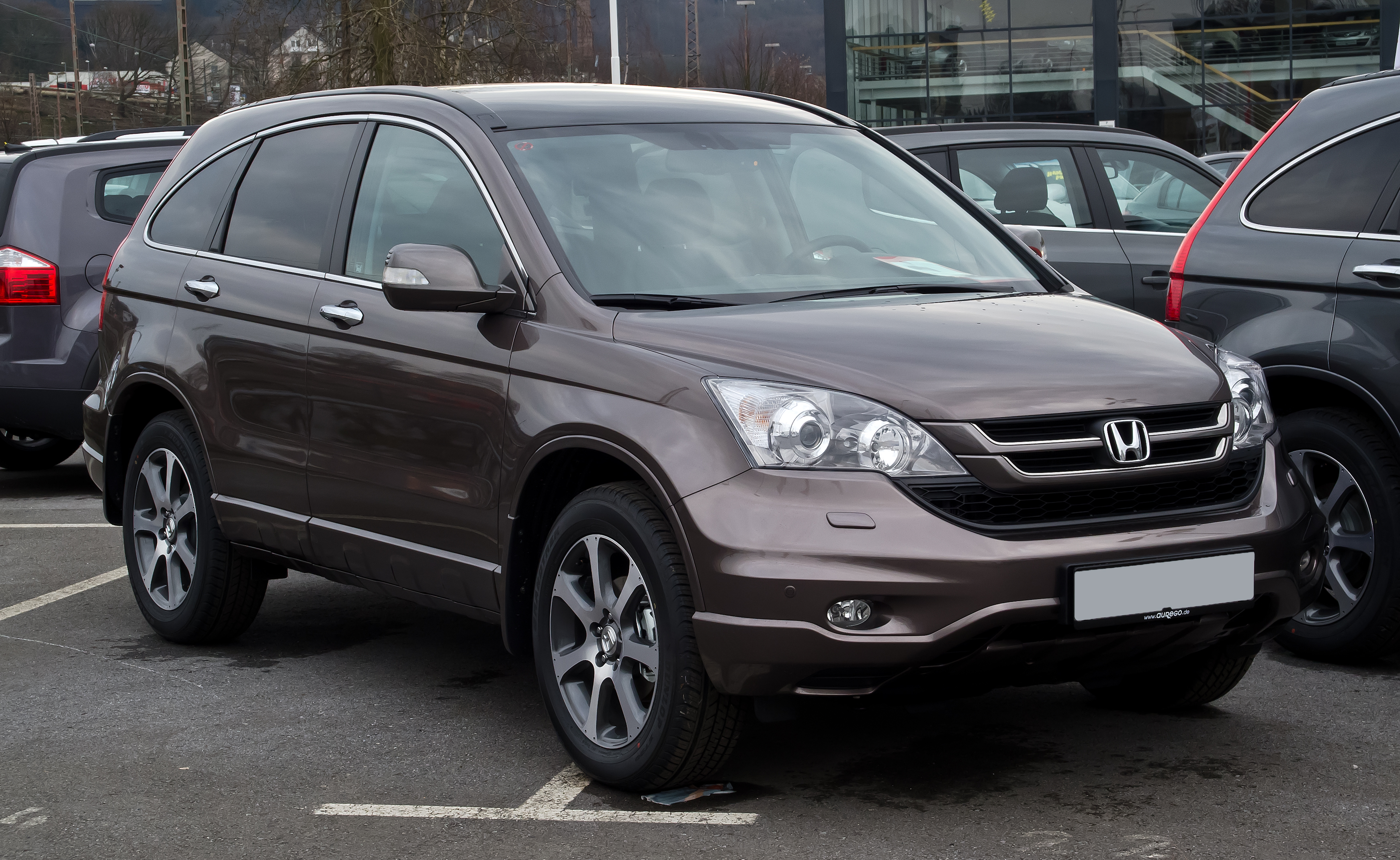
Front (2.2 Executive 50 Jahre Edition)

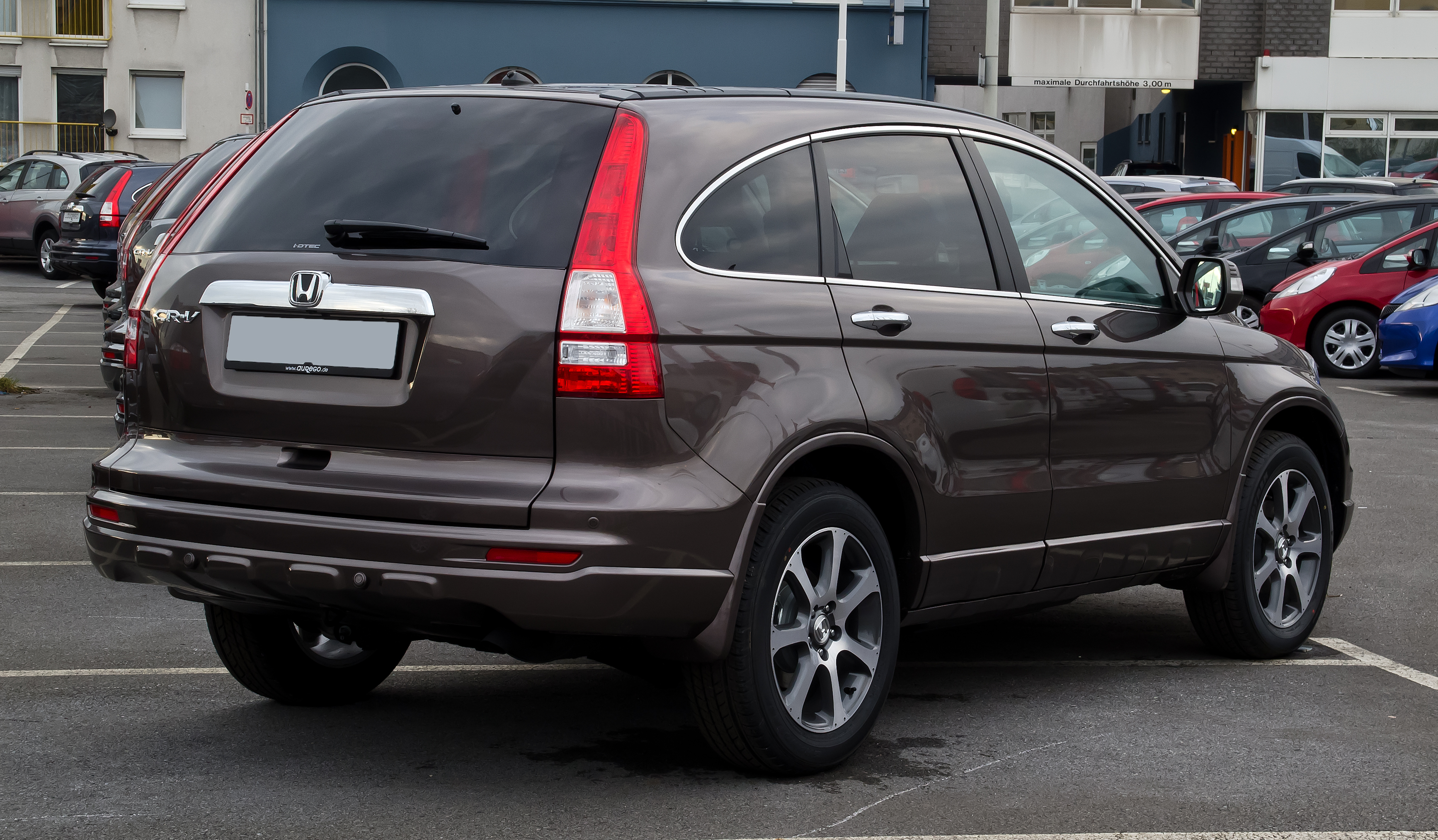
Rear (2.2 Executive 50 Jahre Edition)

== Asia ==
=== Philippines ===
The 2010 Honda CR-V is nearly the same as the US model, but is provided with side-mirror turning signals. It is available in 4x4 (2.4 L) and 4x2 (2.0 L), the former having a five-speed automatic gearbox as standard while the latter having a five-speed automatic or a six-speed manual transmission. The top of the range 2.4 L 4x4 comes with leather upholstery and HID headlamps. All models have rear parking sensors as standard, but no sunroof or GPS fourth generation.

=== Thailand ===
The Honda CR-V has 4 trim levels: 2.0S (2WD), 2.0E (4WD), 2.4EL (2WD) and 2.4EL (4WD). All versions come with a 5-speed automatic transmission. Navigation, DVD and rear-view camera are standard equipment for 2.4EL (2WD) and 2.4EL (4WD) versions. The version with 2.0 engine has 150 horsepower (152 PS; 112 kW) at 6200 rpms, while the version with 2.4 engine has 170 horsepower (172 PS; 127 kW) at 5800 rpms.

=== Indonesia ===
There were three variants of the Honda CR-V in this market: 2.0L M/T, 2.0L A/T and 2.4L A/T. The 2.4L A/T comes standard with single electric driver seat, dual automatic climate control, seven-spoke rims, different level of interior trims and touch-screen enabled stereo system. All versions use a front-wheel drive configuration. In February 2010, the third-generation Honda CR-V was updated with new front grille, rims and minor interior trims.

=== Malaysia ===
In 2007, Honda Malaysia launched the third generation Honda CR-V that has only one variant 2.0L A/T (4WD) i-VTEC SOHC with a 5-speed automatic gearbox featuring 2 overdrive gears for better fuel economy during high speed cruising. This version 2.0L A/T (4WD) i-VTEC SOHC has 150 PS (148 hp; 110 kW) at 6,200rpm and a maximum torque of 190 N⋅m (140 lb⋅ft) at 4,200rpm. This CR-V come with dual i-SRS front airbags, rear parking sensors, active headrests, anti-lock brakes, electronic brake distribution and electric power steering. There is also ample trim level (17-inch alloy wheels), including cruise control, dual zone climate control, a 6-disc in-dash changer with MP3 and aux input, and steering wheel-mounted audio controls, however the seats are fabric, not leather. The Standard package includes a front aero bumper, rear aero bumper, tailgate spoiler, and a running board. The premium package includes a different tailgate spoiler, running board, and door visors. In early 2010, Honda CR-V Facelift officially launched with the one new colour call called Urban Titanium and new redesigned hood, sportier front bumper with fog lights, front grille, rear bumper with lens reflectors and new alloy wheels design (17-inch alloy wheels).This CR-V come with new fabric on the seats, a redesigned climate control knob, wider armrest on the front seats, and a new audio head unit with USB interface and in-dash 6 discs. This CR-V come with new features like Vehicle Stability Assist (VSA) and Dual side airbags with OPDS. This CR-V uses the efficient 150PS and a maximum torque of 190Nm with 2.0L A/T i-VTEC SOHC engine (R20A) mated with 5-Speed Automatic Transmission, Real-Time 4WD, rear parking sensors and Rack and Pinion (Electric Power Steering). One year after the launch of the new Honda CR-V facelift, Honda Malaysia launched the Honda CR-V “Limited” edition which is more expensive than the regular 2.0 i-VTEC CR-V but still uses the same 2.0L i-VTEC engine.

== Europe ==
The CR-V facelift made available to European markets (as well as South Africa) features new added luxuries not previously seen before, and not available to Japanese, Asian or American markets. Xenon (HID) headlights are available for the first time, as are 18-inch alloy wheels (19-inch optional), GPS/DVD navigation system and a premium sound system with USB audio input. A panoramic glass moonroof is standard on upper spec models and all models feature chrome exterior door handles. Externally, the vehicle also features complete body color-coding, on all lower body plastic cladding (models sold elsewhere in the world feature dark grey plastic lower cladding).

The 2.2 L i-CTDI N22A turbo diesel engine was discontinued and replaced by the 2.2 L i-DTEC N22B engine, increasing power output to 150 PS and meeting Euro 5 emission standards.

== South America ==
In Brazil, the third generation CR-V was sold (imported from Mexico) with a 2.0-litre, 150 hp (110 kW) i-VTEC engine instead of the 2.4-litre used in other countries. The reason is that in Brazil the tax is higher for engines above 2.0 litres. The Honda Accord sold in Brazil had the same 2.0-litre engine.

In Peru, the CR-V has different trim levels. The two most equipped ones are the Deluxe and the Platinum. These two, in contrast with the models sold in the US feature chrome door handles and HID headlamps. The Platinum version also comes with rear parking sensors and 18-inch alloy wheels. It does not feature heated front seats because it is considered unnecessary due to the type of climate in Peru. There is no trim level featuring GPS. Trim levels are 4x2-L, LX 4x4, EX 4x4, Deluxe, 4x4, Top and Platinum.
