= Honda City =

Subcompact car by Honda, since 1981

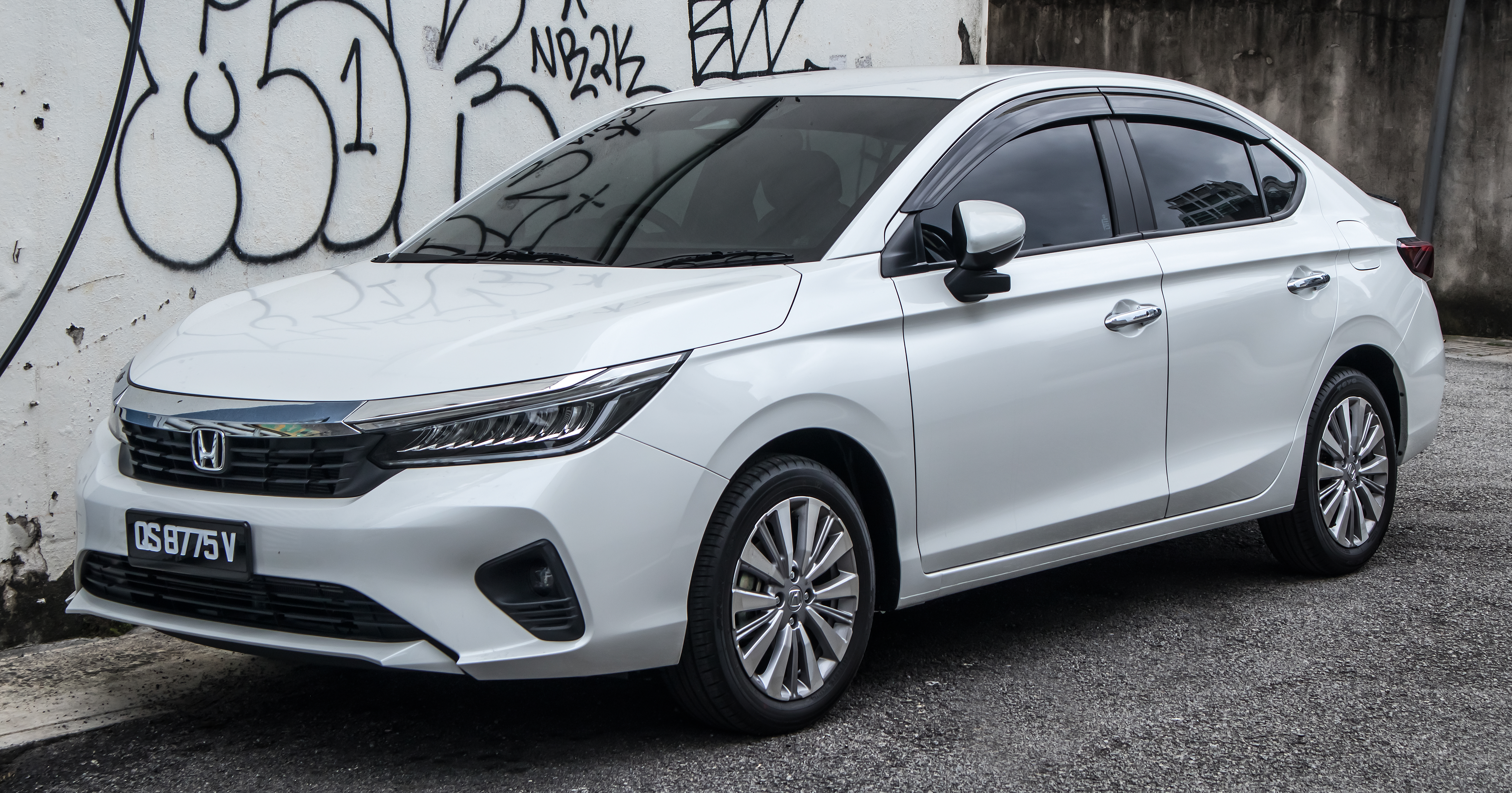
- Honda City V (GN2, Malaysia)

Overview
- Manufacturer: Honda
- Production: 1981–1995; 1996–present

Body and chassis
- Class: Subcompact car (B)
- Body style: 3-door hatchback (1981–1995); 2-door convertible (1984–1986); 4-door sedan (1996–present); 5-door liftback (Gienia, 2016–2020); 5-door hatchback (2020–present)

The Honda City (Japanese: ホンダ・シティ, Hepburn: Honda Shiti) is a subcompact car which has been produced by the Japanese manufacturer Honda since 1981.

The City was originally a three-door hatchback for the Japanese, European, and Australasian markets. The three-door City was retired in 1995 after the second-generation and replaced by the Logo. The nameplate was revived in 1996 for use on a series of subcompact four-door sedans aimed primarily at developing markets, (Note: A sedan is also known as a saloon car.) first mainly sold in Asia but later also in Latin America and Australia. Since then, it has been a subcompact sedan built on Honda's Global Small Car platform, which is shared with the Fit/Jazz (a 5-door hatchback), the Airwave/Partner, and the first-generation Mobilio — all of which share the location of the fuel tank under the front seats rather than rear seats. The seventh-generation model launched in 2019 features a significant size growth, offering an exterior dimension on par with the ninth-generation Civic sedan. This generation also marks the introduction of the five-door hatchback model starting from 2020.

From 2002 to 2008, the City was also sold as the Honda Fit Aria (Japanese: ホンダ・フィット アリア, Hepburn: Honda Fitto Aria) in Japan. The City is also sold as the Honda Ballade in South Africa since 2011. The City was reintroduced in Japan in 2014, this time called the Honda Grace (Japanese: ホンダ・グレイス, Hepburn: Honda Gureisu) up to its discontinuation in 2020. Between 2015 and 2019, Dongfeng Honda sold a remodelled version of the City called the Honda Greiz, and its 5-door liftback counterpart Honda Gienia.

== First generation (AA/FV/FA; 1981) ==
First generation
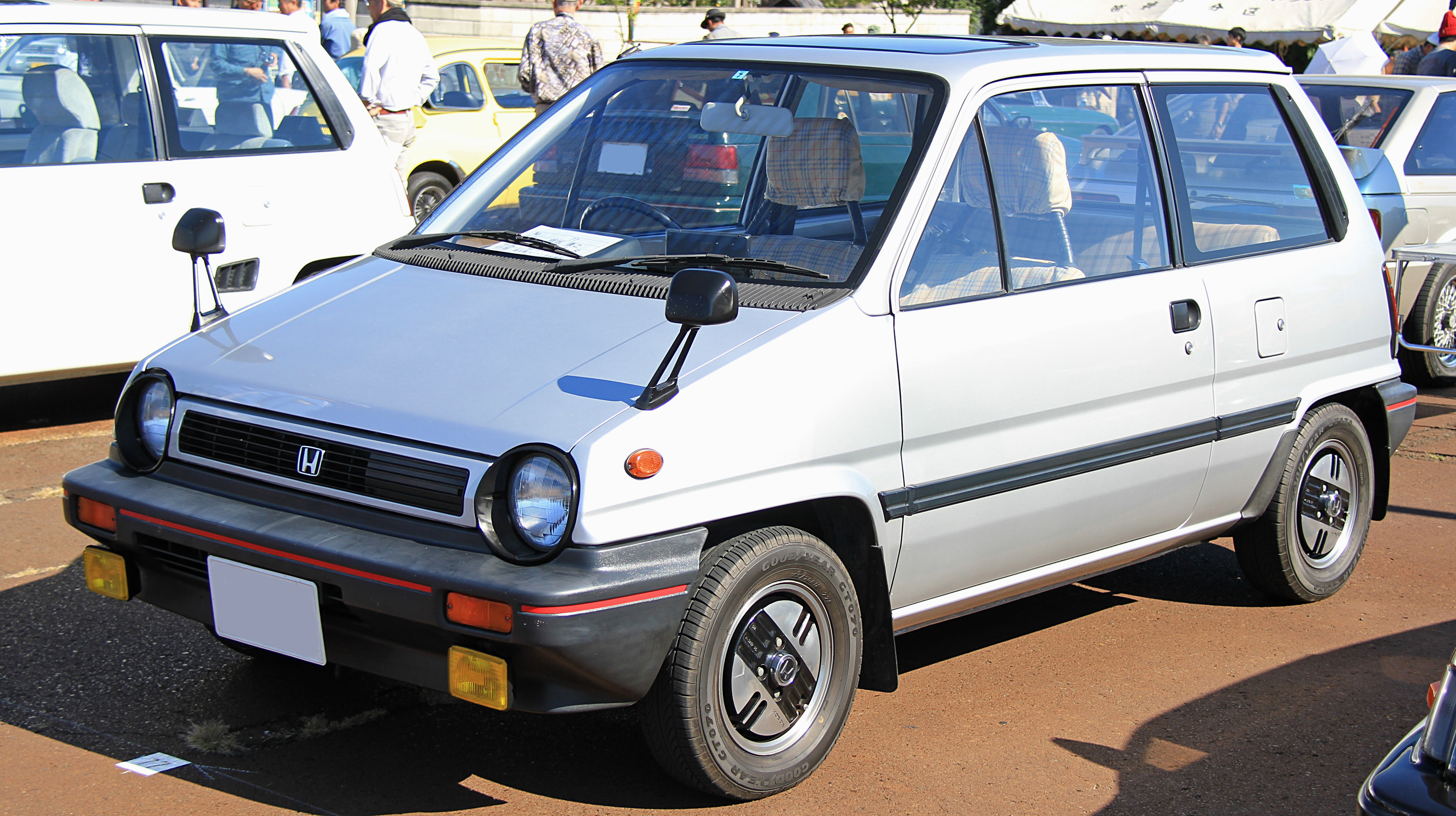

Overview
- Model code: AA (sedan); VF (van); FA (Turbo II and cabriolet)
- Also called: Honda Jazz
- Production: 1981–1986

Body and chassis
- Body style: 2-door convertible 3-door hatchback/van
- Layout: Front-engine, front-wheel drive

Powertrain
- Engine: 1,231 cc ER I4
- Transmission: 4/5-speed manual 4+3-speed Hypershift manual 3-speed Hondamatic automatic

Dimensions
- Wheelbase: 2,220 mm (87.4 in)
- Length: 3,380–3,420 mm (133.1–134.6 in)
- Width: 1,570–1,625 mm (61.8–64.0 in)
- Height: 1,460–1,570 mm (57.5–61.8 in)
- Curb weight: 640–810 kg (1,411–1,786 lb)

The first Honda City (AA for sedans, VF for vans and FA for the wider Turbo II and Cabriolets) was introduced in November 1981 with the innovative "Tallboy" design; of unusual height, this enabled four adults to fit comfortably in the very short City (under 3.4 m [11.2 ft] long). Produced as a 3-door hatchback in a variety of trim levels, the City was also available together with the Motocompo, a special 50 cc 'foldaway' scooter with 2.5 PS (1.8 kW) designed to fit in the City's small luggage area ("trunk"); called a "trunk bike", Honda invented the compound word "trabai" for this scooter. At the time of its introduction, it was Honda's smallest car, while not being in compliance with Japanese government kei regulations. It was longer than the Honda N360 by 385 mm (15.2 in), but shorter than the first-generation Honda Civic by 171 millimetres (6.7 in).

The Honda City Turbo was introduced in September 1982. It was powered by a turbocharged version of the 1231 cc Honda ER engine.

The City Turbo II was introduced in October 1983. The fender was widened by 30 mm at the front and 20 mm at the rear. Technically, the engine used is the same as the previous City turbo, but the power output is 110 PS (81 kW) more powerful. Due to its wider dimensions, The City Turbo II was nicknamed the "Bulldog".

On 4 July Pininfarina designed drop-top Cabriolet utilised the wider fenders and bigger bumpers of the Turbo II "Bulldog", but was only available with the naturally aspirated 67 PS (49 kW) engine.

There was also a Pro-series of van versions with either two or four seats. A high-roof "R Manhattan Roof" version with a 10-centimetre (3.9 in) taller roof also appeared.

Exports of the City were primarily to Europe (where it was renamed Honda Jazz, due to Opel having trademarked the City name), Australia (in two-seater 'van' form, to circumvent Australian import restrictions on passenger vehicles at the time) and New Zealand (where it was locally assembled). Production ended in late 1986 with the introduction of the GA type City.

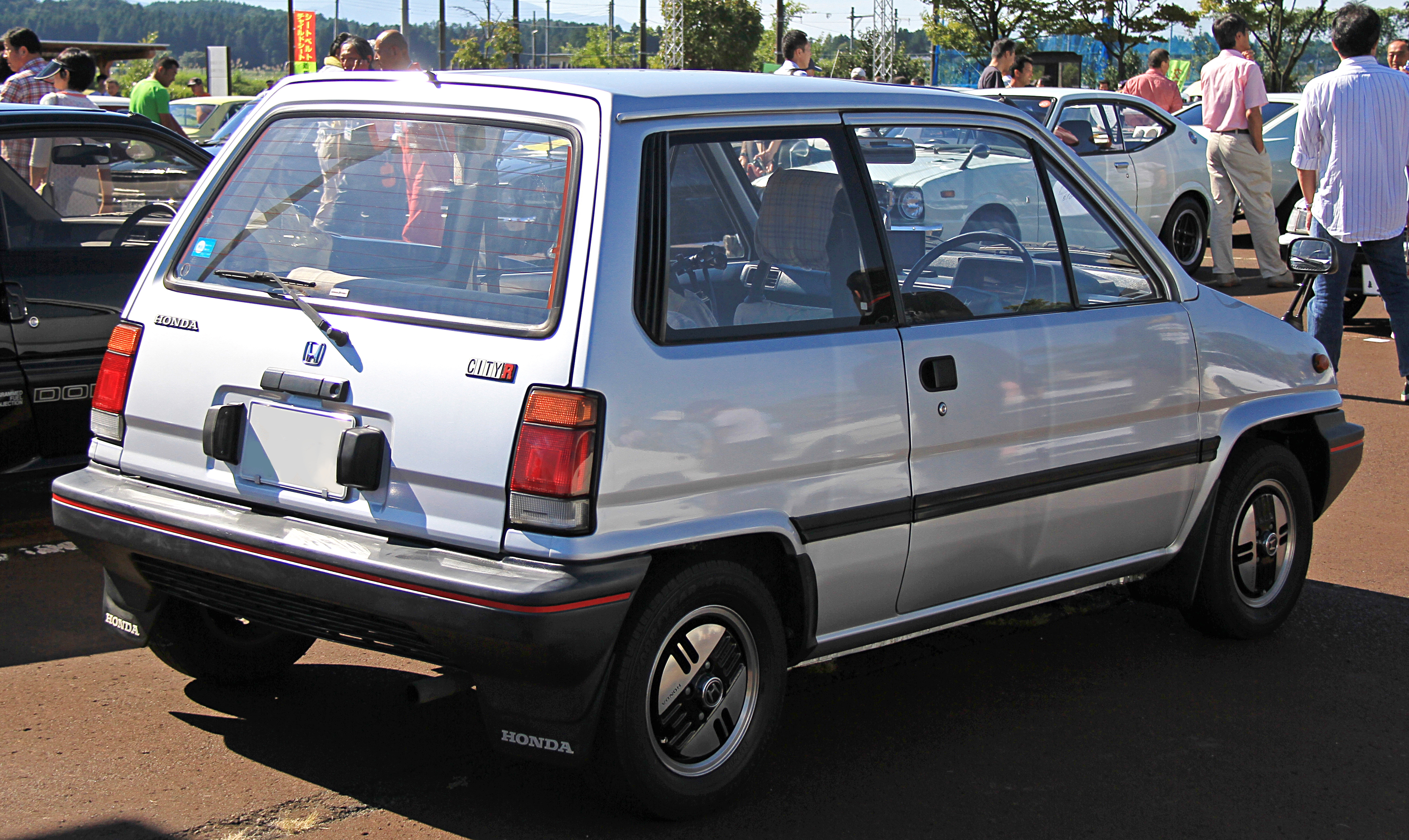
1983 Honda City R (rear view)

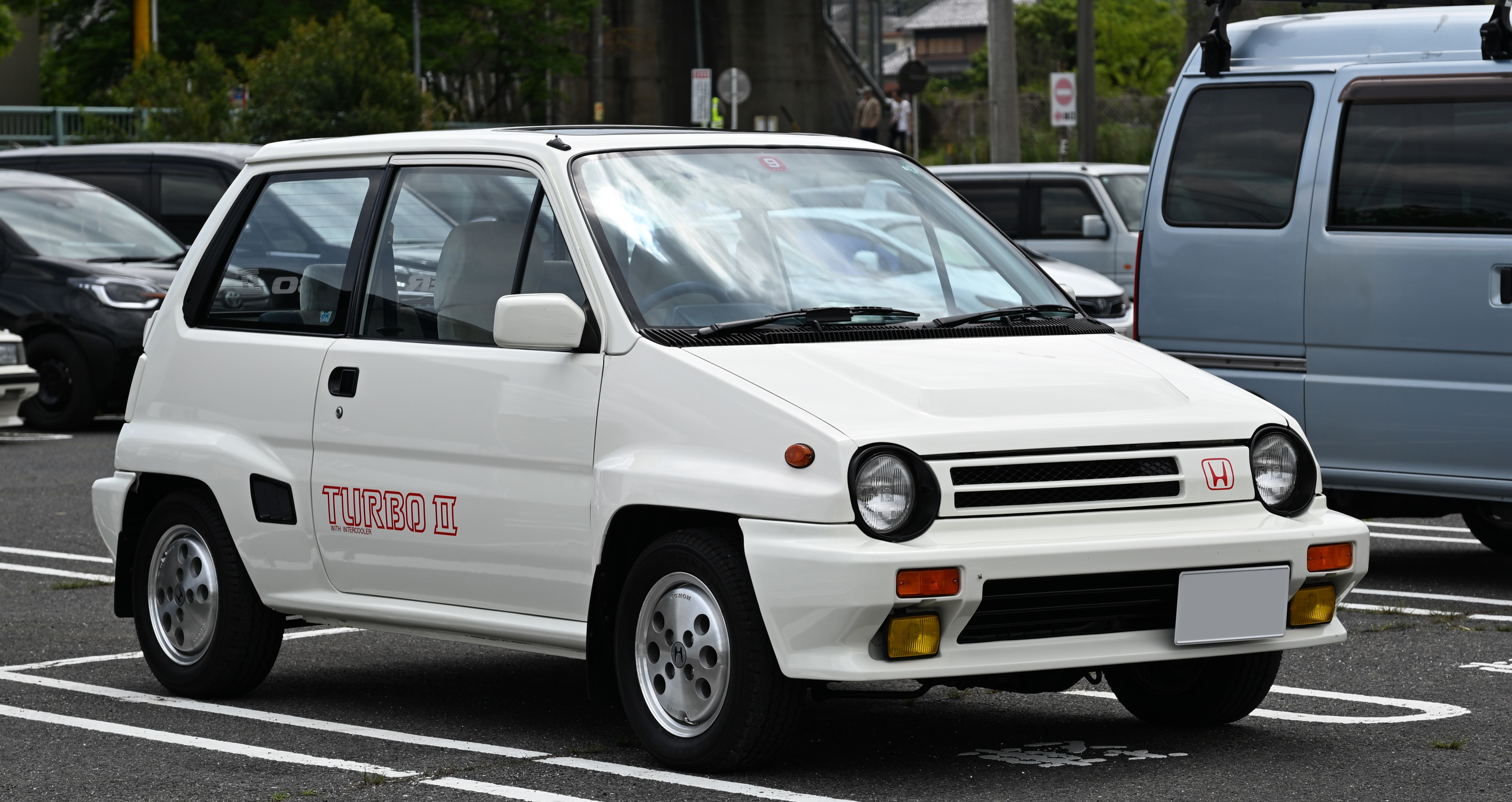
Honda City Turbo II

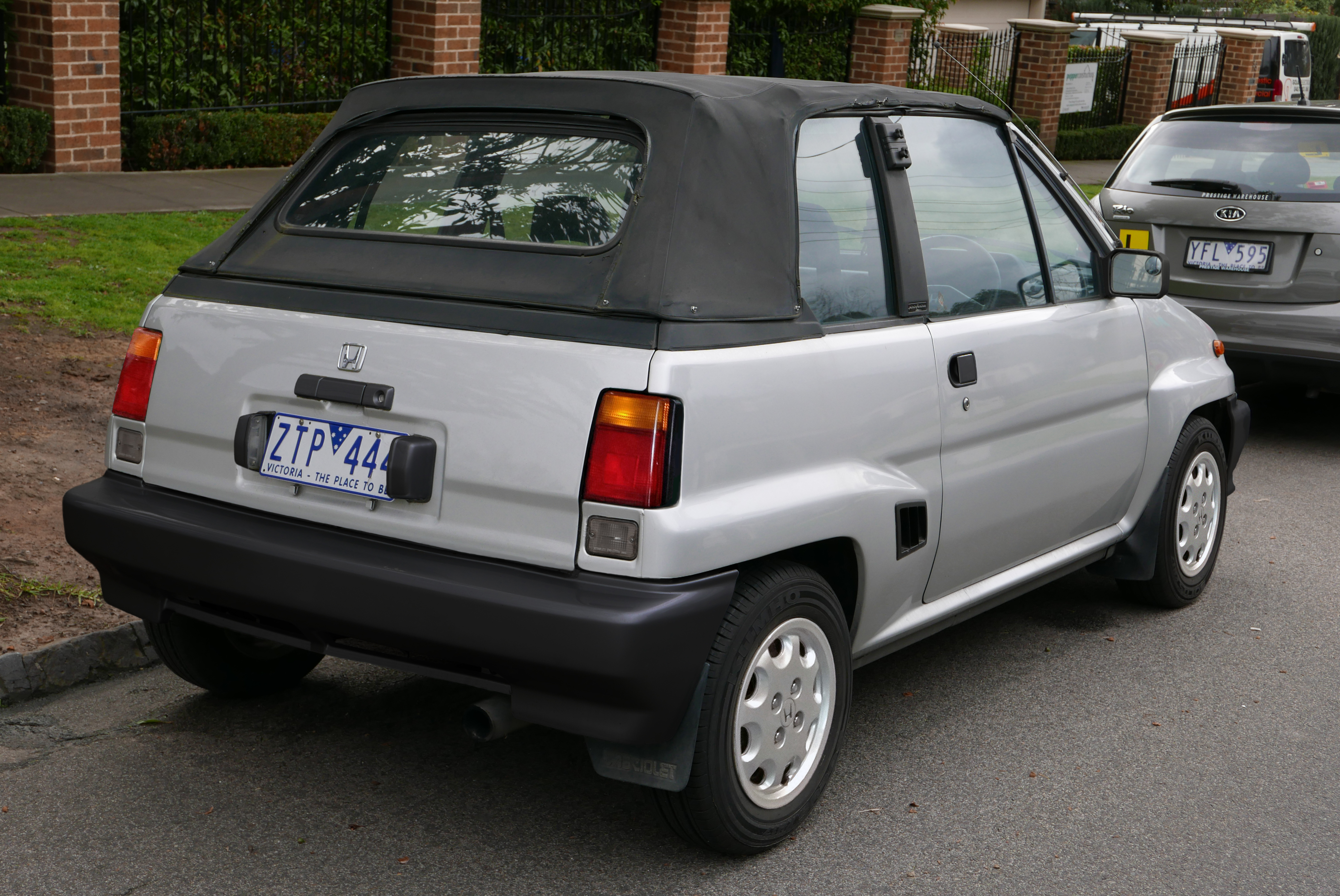
Honda City Cabriolet

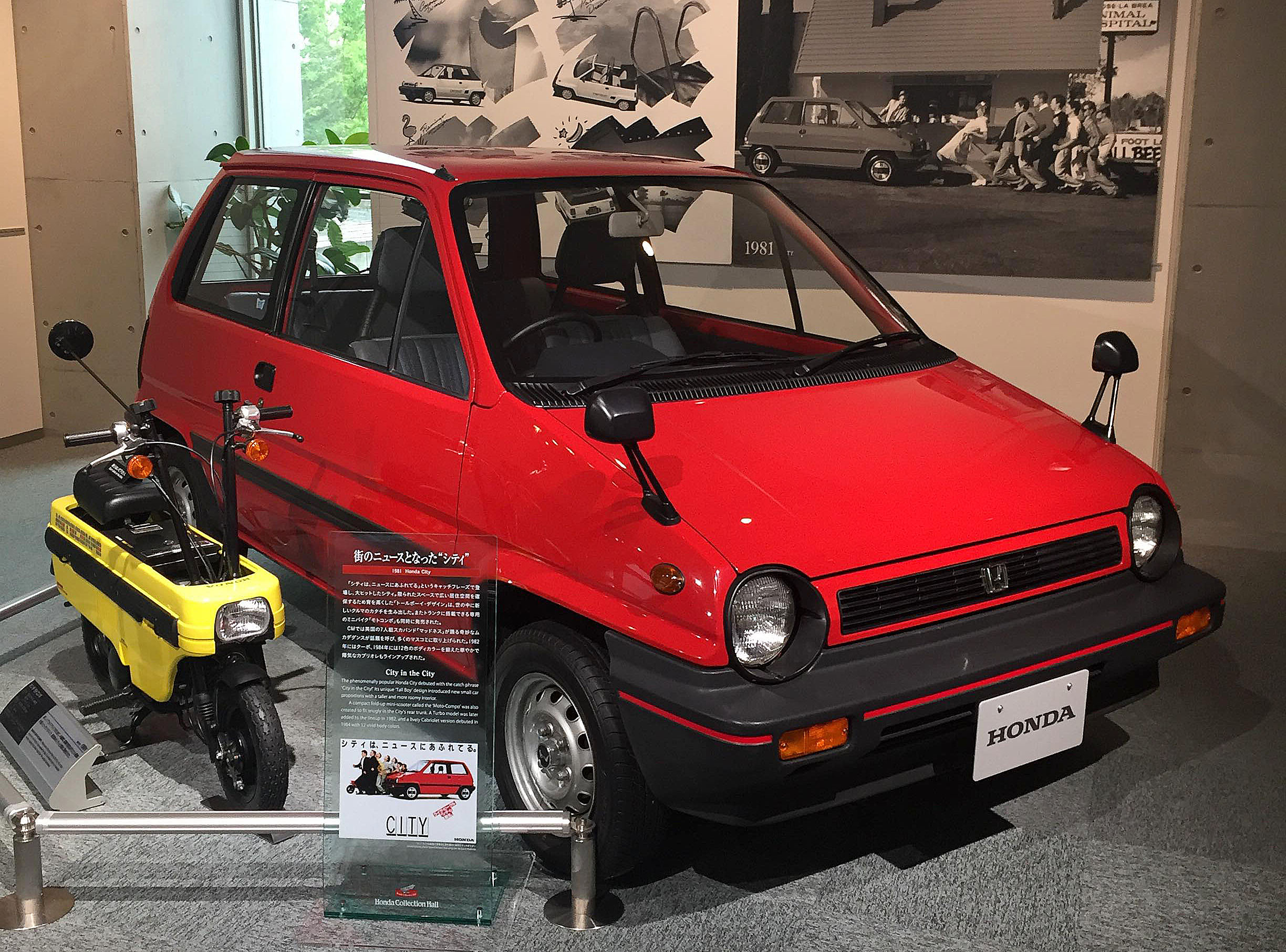
Honda City and Motocompo display at Honda Collection Hall in Motegi

== Second generation (GA; 1986) ==
Second generation
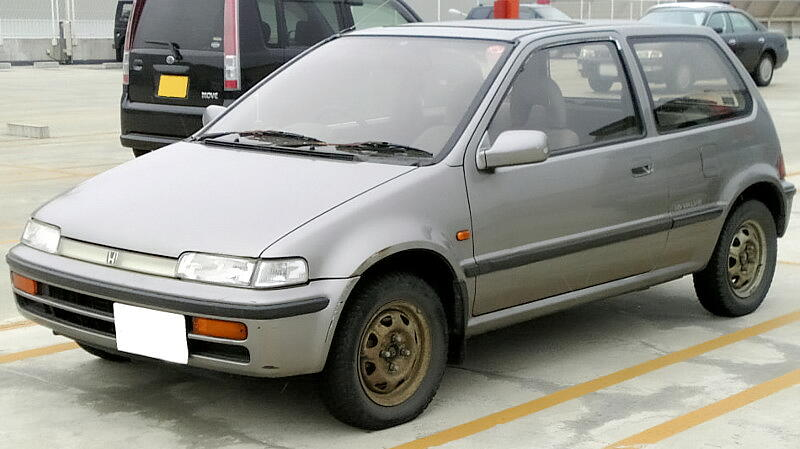

Overview
- Model code: GA1; GA2
- Production: October 1986 – December 1995

Body and chassis
- Body style: 3-door hatchback
- Layout: Front-engine, front-wheel drive

Powertrain
- Engine: 1,238 cc D12A I4; 1,296 cc D13C I4
- Transmission: 5-speed manual 4-speed automatic

Dimensions
- Wheelbase: 2,400 mm (94.5 in)
- Length: 3,560 mm (140.2 in) (GA1); 3,605 mm (141.9 in) (GA2)
- Width: 1,620 mm (63.8 in)
- Height: 1,335 mm (52.6 in)
- Curb weight: 680 kg (1,499 lb) (GA1); 780 kg (1,720 lb) (GA2)

Chronology
- Successor: Honda Logo; Honda Capa; Honda City (series 3A/SX)

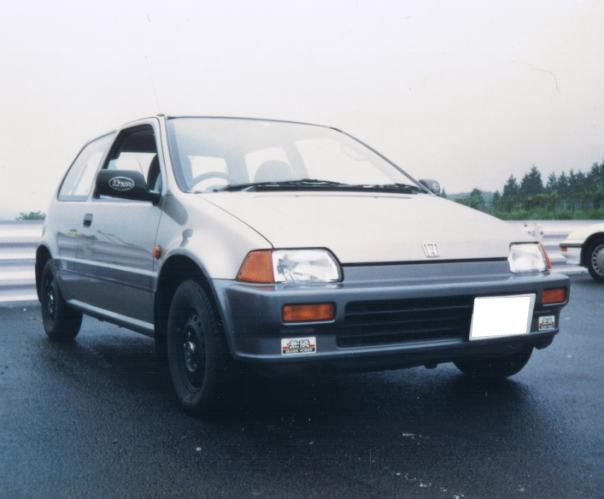
Honda City (GA1)

Honda replaced the original City series AA in November 1986 with this generation (designated GA1), and again with an update in 1989 (GA2). This model was produced until 1994. The Fit name also first appeared as a trim variant of the second-generation City. There was no convertible model, with both the convertible and Turbo models of the previous generation continuing on sale for a little while. In most markets aside from Japan, the City's market position was left open until filled by the Honda Logo in 1999.

On 31 October 1986, the second-generation City was introduced with the slogan "City of Talent." in Japan, and was available at Honda Clio dealerships. The Honda Clio dealership chain was being positioned as Honda's purveyor of luxuriously equipped vehicles like the Honda Legend, the Honda Concerto, and the Honda Accord, and this generation City enabled Clio locations to sell economically priced vehicles normally found at Honda Primo.

In this remodel, there are major changes in the appearance of the vehicle Honda called "Crouching form", which consisted of a low and wide design that contributed to lighter vehicle weight (basic trim 680 kg) combined with improvements in driving performance. The styling reflects a corporate decision to enact a shared appearance with the first-generation Honda Today (a kei car), the internationally strong seller, third-generation Honda Civic (a subcompact car), and the third-generation Honda Accord AeroDeck (a compact car). This generation shared its exterior dimensions and engine size almost exactly with the first-generation Civic. The Honda CR-X was the only three-door hatchback that adopted a fastback, sloping rear hatch, similar to the Honda Verno products during the mid-1980s.

The engine configuration introduced the Honda D series, in the form of the type D12A, a 1.2 L SOHC straight-four 16-valve unit only available with a single carburetor, and basic level of equipment. The differences between the "GG", "EE", and "BB" were only in the level of equipment. Power is 76 PS (56 kW) at 6,500 rpm. A five-speed manual or a four-speed automatic transmission were optional.

In October 1988, the main engine was changed to 1.3 L SOHC inline-four, type D13C. In addition to the traditional single carburetor, Honda's PGM-FI fuel injection was also offered on the new 1.3. The 1.2 L "BE" was the base model and had a single carburetor, as did the 1.3-litre "CE" and "CG" variants. PGM-FI was fitted to the sporting "CR-i" and "CZ-i" models.

The "CE" trim equipment with enhanced savings "CE Fit", PGM-FI specification is "CR-i" based only high-trim "CR-i Limited" was introduced, the late "CZ-i" is defined as the minor trim package. The word "Fit" appears as a trim package on the base trim "CE".

At the end of this generation, by trim consolidation, "Fit" is used for all single carburetor vehicles. The trim package "Fit" later became the model name of the successor of the Honda Logo which replaced this car.

The second generation was discontinued in 1995. In Japan, the name "City" was retired at the end of this series' conclusion of production. The replacement vehicles introduced in 1996 on the GA base were renamed Honda Logo (three-door hatchback, GA3/5 series), and the Honda Capa with five-door hatchback bodywork.

== Third generation (3A/SX; 1996) ==
Third generation
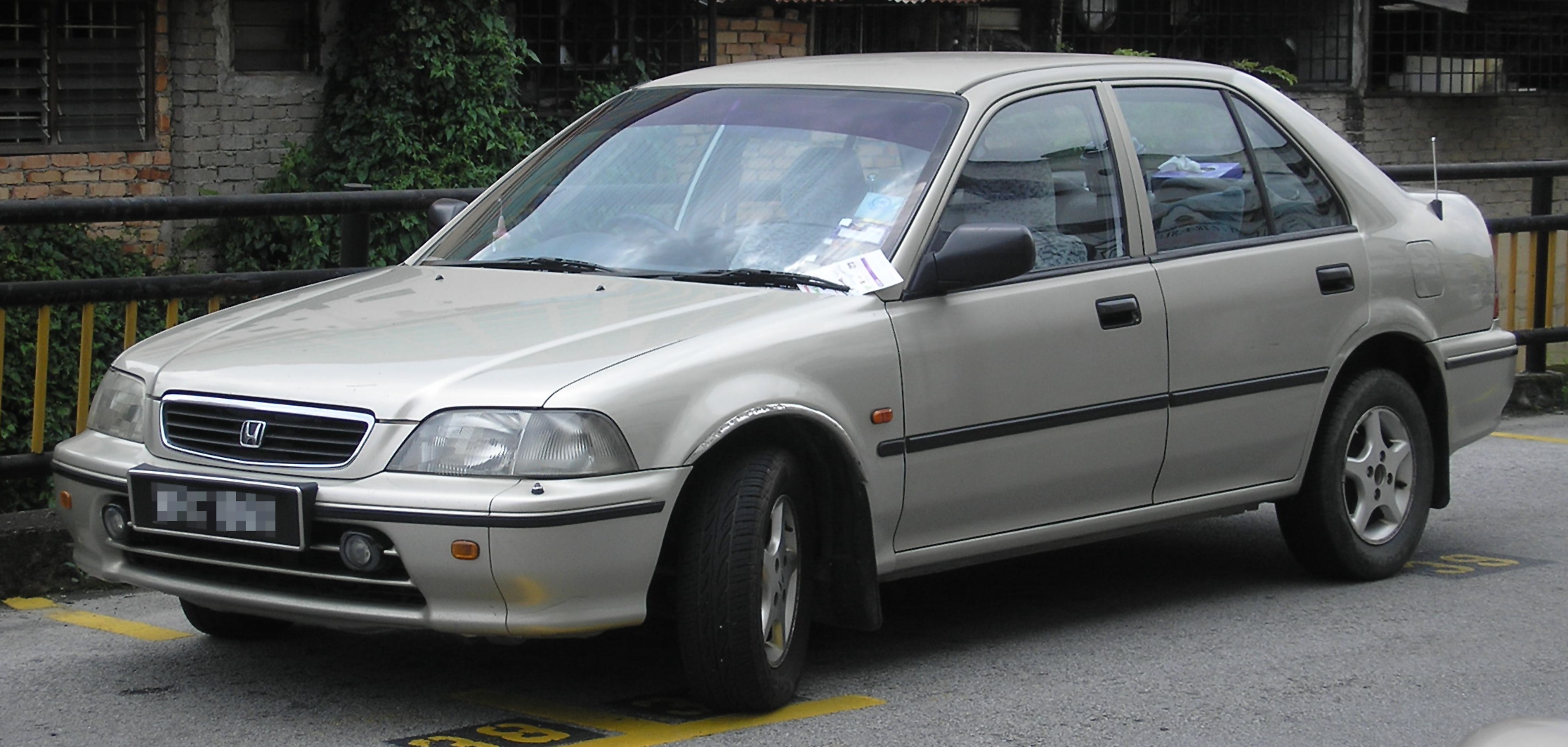
- Honda City (pre-facelift, Malaysia)

Overview
- Model code: 3A2; 3A3; SX8
- Production: 1996–2002
- Assembly: Thailand: Ayutthaya; Indonesia: North Jakarta; Philippines: Santa Rosa, Laguna; Taiwan: Hsinchu (Sanyang Motor); India: Greater Noida (HSCI); Pakistan: Lahore (HACP); Malaysia: Johor Bahru (Kah Motor Co.)

Body and chassis
- Body style: 4-door sedan
- Layout: Front-engine, front-wheel drive
- Platform: 3A2/3A3
- Related: Honda Civic (fourth generation)

Powertrain
- Engine: Petrol: 1.3 L D13B I4; 1.5 L D15B I4; 1.5 L D15B VTEC I4
- Transmission: 5-speed manual 4-speed automatic

Dimensions
- Wheelbase: 2,500 mm (98.4 in)
- Length: 4,225 mm (166.3 in)
- Width: 1,690 mm (66.5 in)
- Height: 1,395 mm (54.9 in)
- Curb weight: 940–985 kg (2,072–2,172 lb)

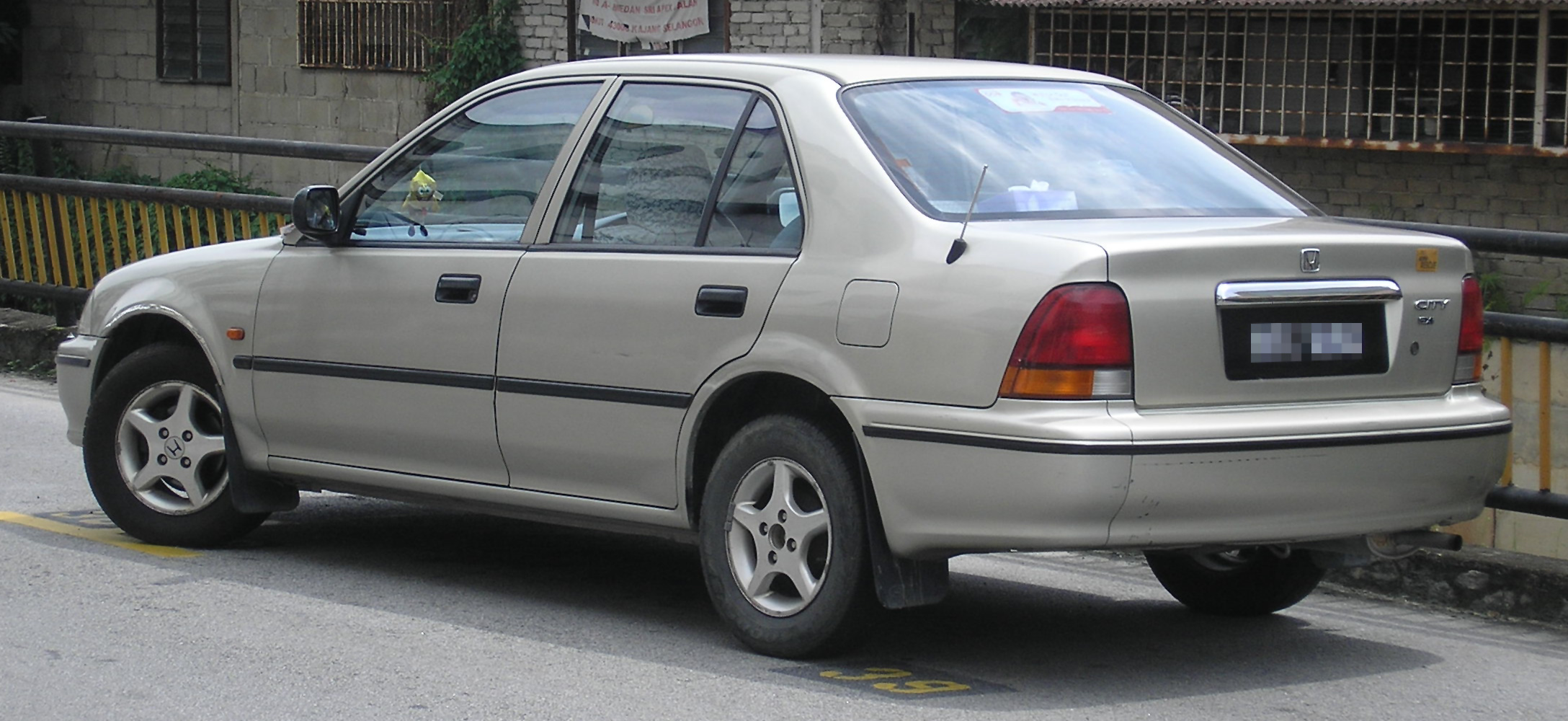
Honda City (pre-facelift, Malaysia)

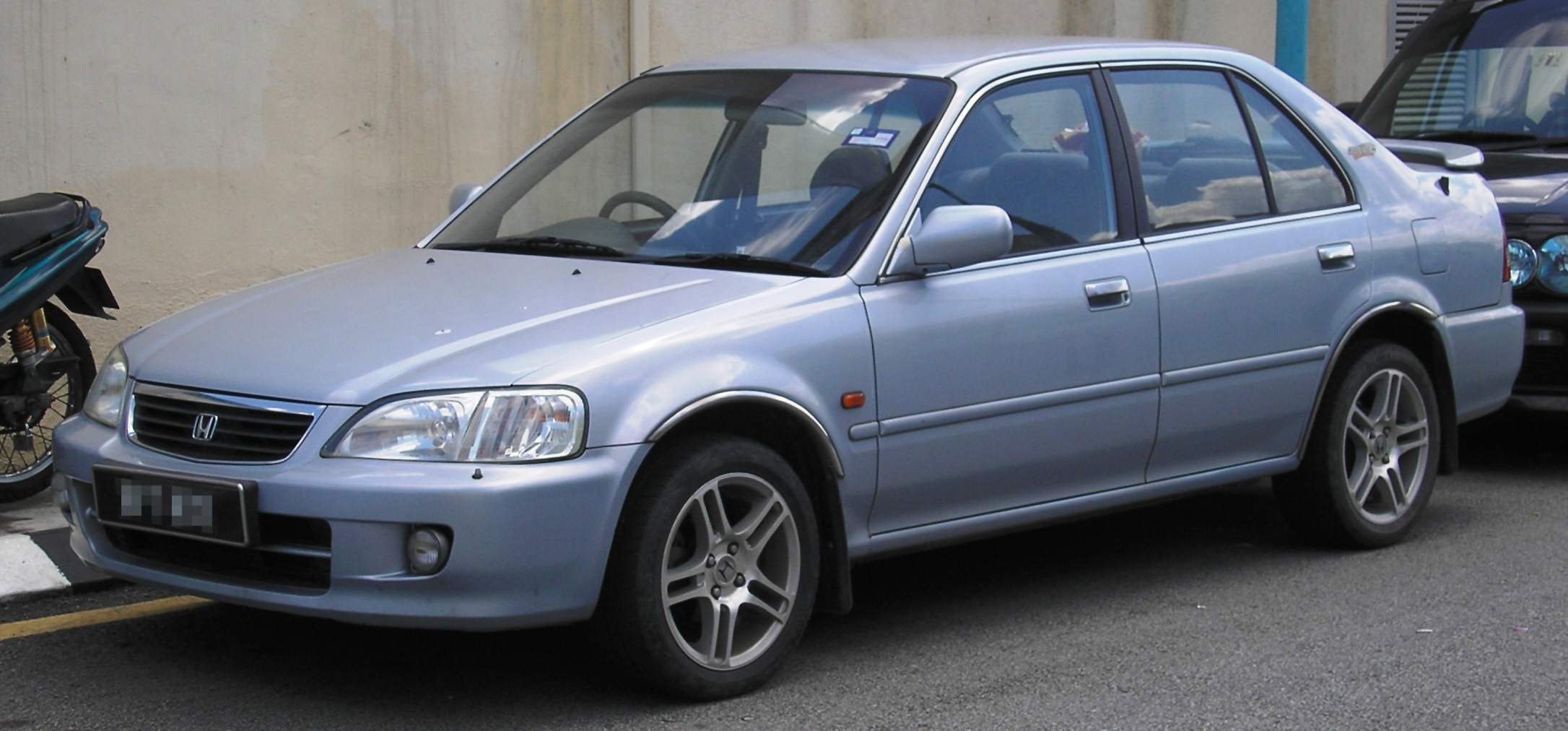

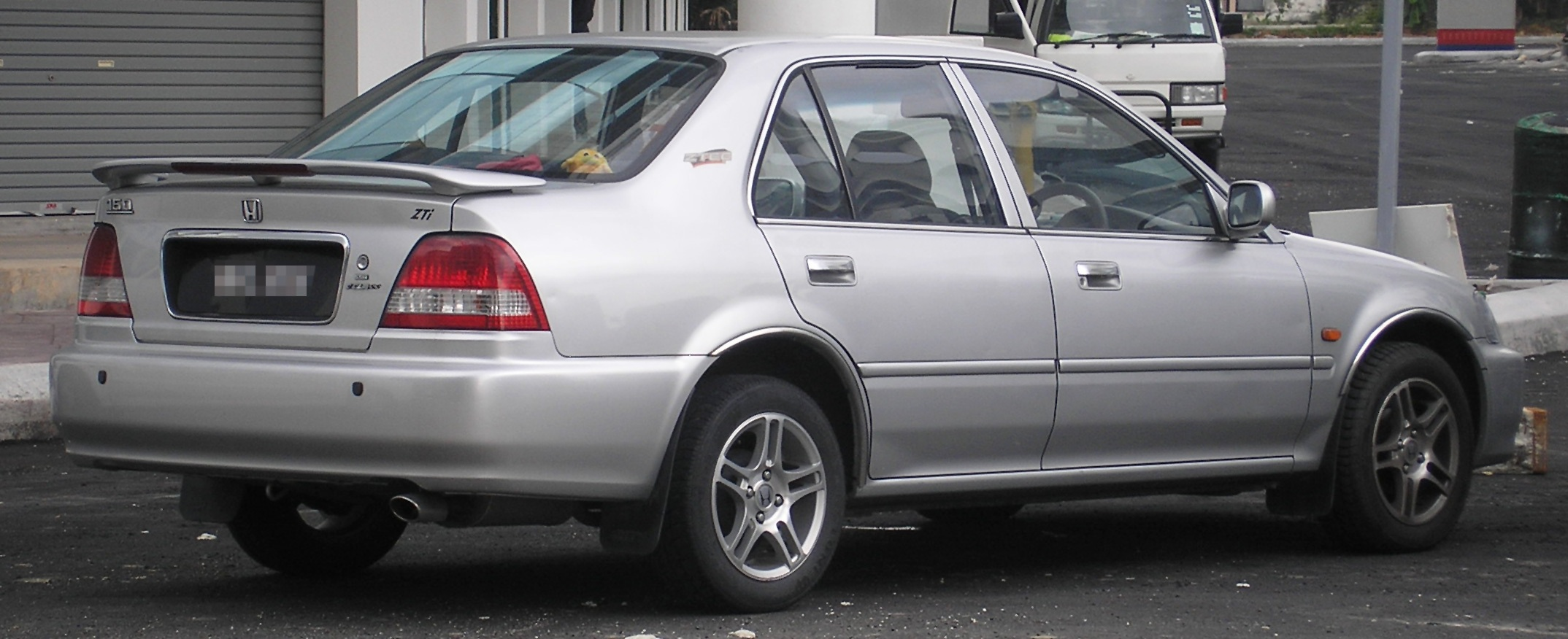
Honda City Type-Z (facelift, Malaysia)

The City was revived as a subcompact four-door sedan, slotting beneath the Honda Civic, for developing markets in Asia. The third-generation City (first-generation as a sedan), codenamed SX8 but with chassis codes 3A2 (1.3) and 3A3 (1.5), was based on the EF Civic platform to cut costs. It was designed for and sold in the Southeast Asian market only, and launched with the slogan "Smart for the new generation" for the 1.3-litre version and "Top-in-class smart" slogan for the 1.5-litre model. First production began in an all-new plant in Ayutthaya, Thailand, in April 1996. The car had a dominant position in the market. From the beginning, the Thai-made City models had more than 70% local content. The bumpers were constructed in three separate pieces to allow for easier shipping from Japan. There were originally a lower trim LXi and a higher-spec EXi available. The sedan also marked Honda's entrance in the Indian market in 1998 and it quickly became a success and one of the top selling cars in its segment.

The City was built in additional markets including: India, Indonesia, Malaysia, Pakistan, the Philippines and Taiwan. In Pakistan, the City received a lukewarm reception at first, but the third generation was a massive hit. A revised, facelifted third-generation City was released in 2000, called the "Type Z" in some markets. By 2001 a model powered by Honda's 1.5 L VTEC engines (VTI) appeared, with a rear-stabilizer for better handling. The facelift model received new front end tail lights, as well as one-piece bumpers.

The third-generation City had fuel-injected SOHC 16-valve D-series engines, namely variations of the D13B and D15B. The original 1.3 L (1,343 cc) D13B produced 95 PS (70 kW) at 6,400 rpm for a claimed top speed of 171 km/h and 0–100 km/h in 11.3 seconds. This was later complemented by the 1.5-litre D15B, which was reduced in power for the Asian markets where the car was sold. The D15B engine also arrived in a version with VTEC (B15C2 engine).

== Fourth generation (GD/GE; 2002) ==
Fourth generation
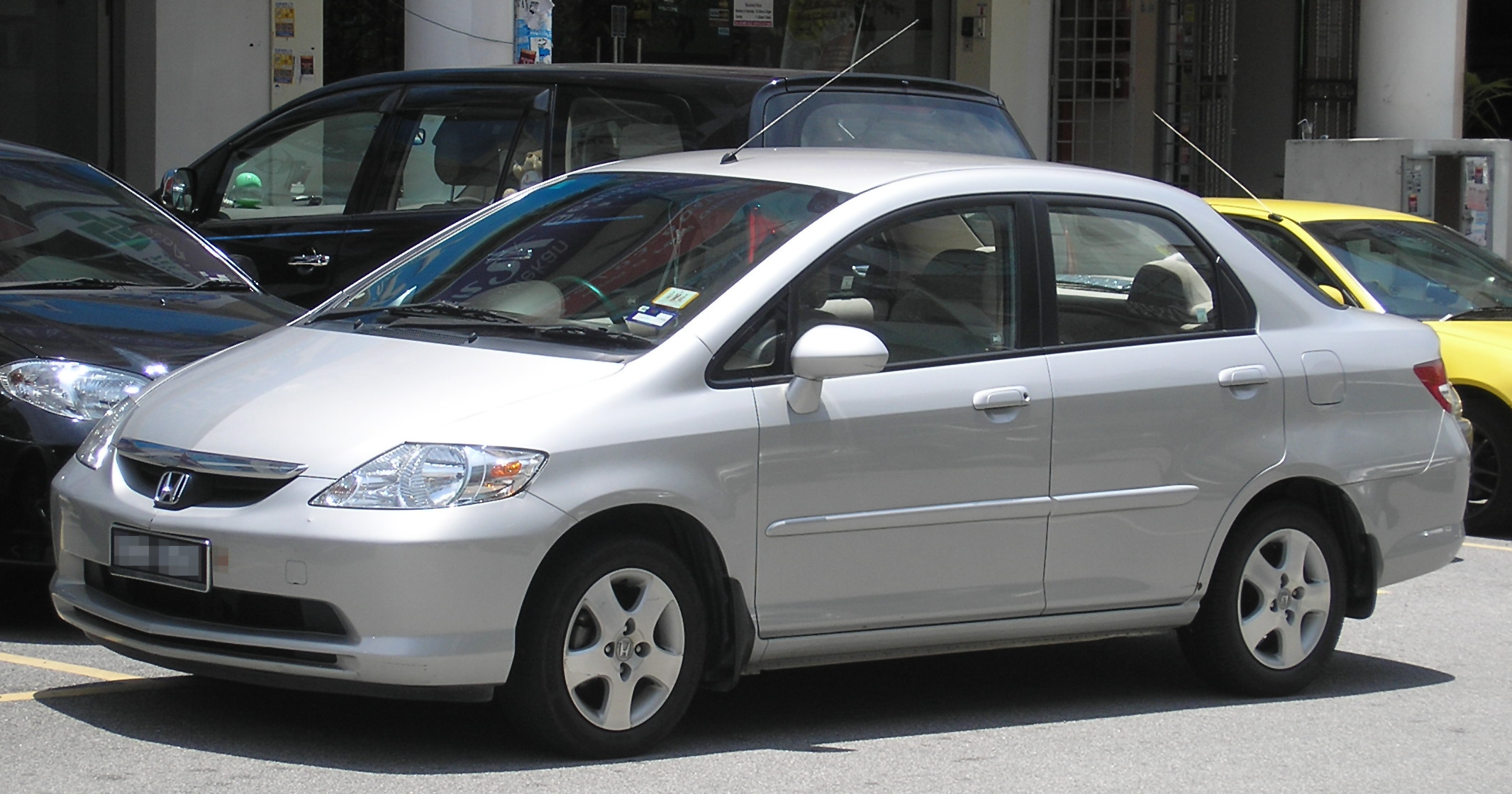
- Honda City (pre-facelift, Malaysia)

Overview
- Model code: GD6; GD7; GD8; GD9; GE1; GE4
- Also called: Honda Fit Aria (Japan); Honda Fit Saloon (China, 2003–2006); Everus S1 (China)
- Production: 2002–2008; 2011–2014 (Everus S1)
- Assembly: China: Guangzhou (Guangqi Honda, JDM and Far East models only); India: Greater Noida (HSCI, South Asia models only); Malaysia: Alor Gajah, Malacca (Oceanica models only); Pakistan: Lahore (HACP, West Asia and Middle East models only); Philippines: Santa Rosa, Laguna (East Asia models only); Thailand: Ayutthaya; Turkey: Şekerpınar, Çayırova, Kocaeli (Honda Türkiye, Europe and Turkey domestic market models only)

Body and chassis
- Body style: 4-door sedan
- Layout: Front-engine, front-wheel drive (GD6/GD8); Front-engine, all-wheel-drive (GD7/GD9)
- Related: Honda Fit/Jazz (first generation); Honda Airwave

Powertrain
- Engine: Petrol: 1.3 L L13A i-DSI I4; 1.5 L L15A2 i-DSI I4; 1.5 L L15A1 VTEC I4; 2.0 L K20A I4 (Type-S)
- Transmission: 5-speed manual; CVT (7-speed Multimatic)

Dimensions
- Wheelbase: 2,450 mm (96.5 in)
- Length: 4,390 mm (172.8 in)
- Width: 1,690 mm (66.5 in)
- Height: 1,485 mm (58.5 in)
- Curb weight: 1,190 kg (2,624 lb)

Chronology
- Predecessor: Honda Domani (Japan); Honda Integra SJ (1996–2001) / Isuzu Vertex (Thailand)
- Successor: Honda Insight (second generation) (Japan)

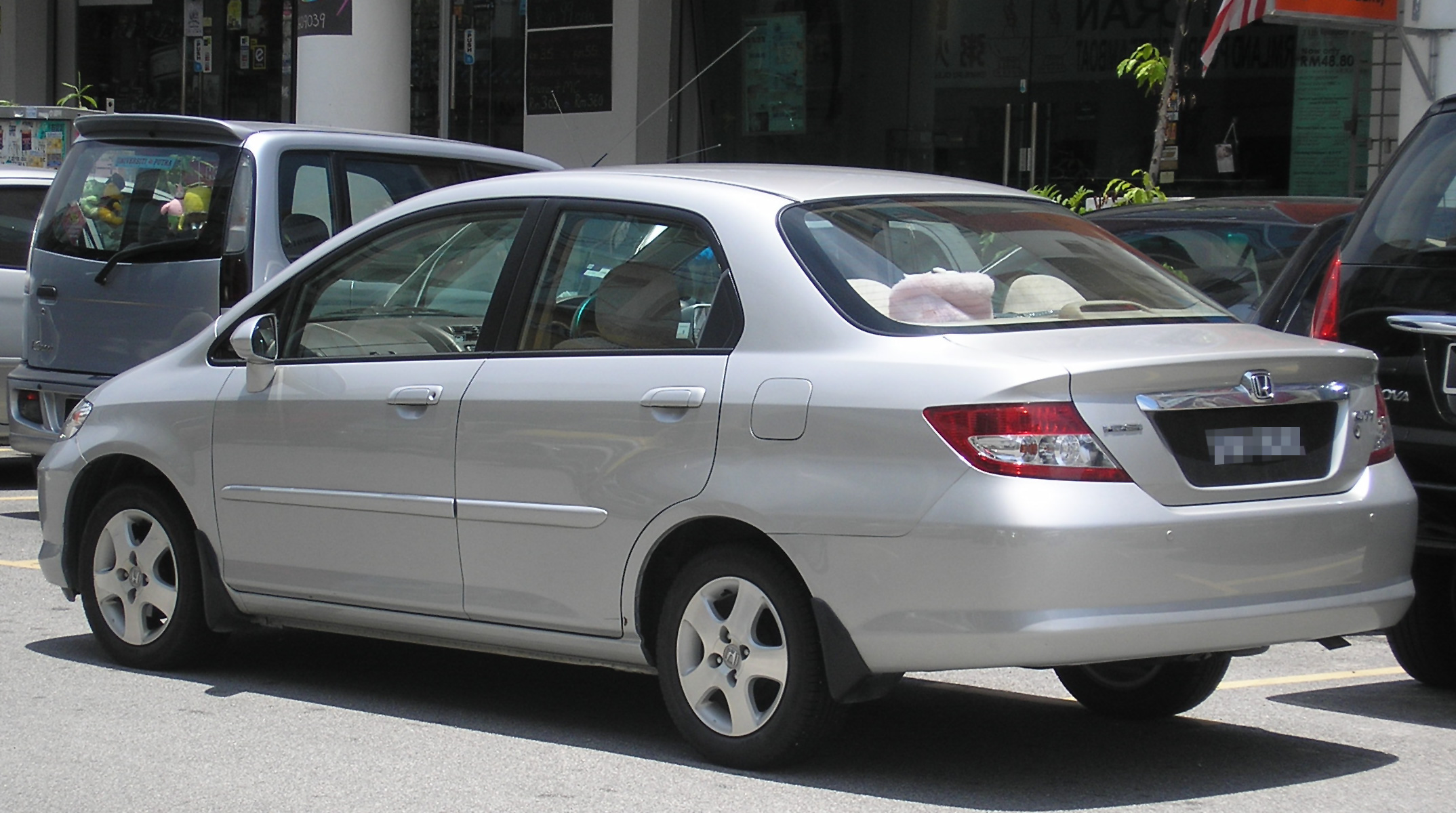
Honda City (pre-facelift, Malaysia)

The fourth-generation City (second-generation as a sedan) made its world debut at the Thailand International Motor Expo in Bangkok in November 2002. Development of the vehicle continued to be handled by Honda Thailand. It was launched in Japan as the Fit Aria on 20 December 2002, as a captive import sourced from Thailand. The word "aria" is a type of expressive melody, usually heard in opera. Honda chose the word, continuing its musical naming tradition used with the Honda Prelude, the Honda Accord, the Honda Ballade, the Honda Quint, and the Honda Concerto. It was offered as a four-wheel drive version.

The City was initially launched with a twin-spark, lean burn ‘i-DSI’ engine producing 88PS that was primarily designed to provide outstanding fuel economy. The VTEC version was unveiled late in the fourth-generation City's lifespan in 2004. The VTEC variant of the City is offered with 15-inch alloy wheels compared to the 14-inch offered in the i-DSI and the rear brakes are solid discs on the VTEC variant instead of drums in the i-DSI. Also, the VTEC model uses a 7-speed Multimatic CVT automatic transmission.

=== Facelift ===
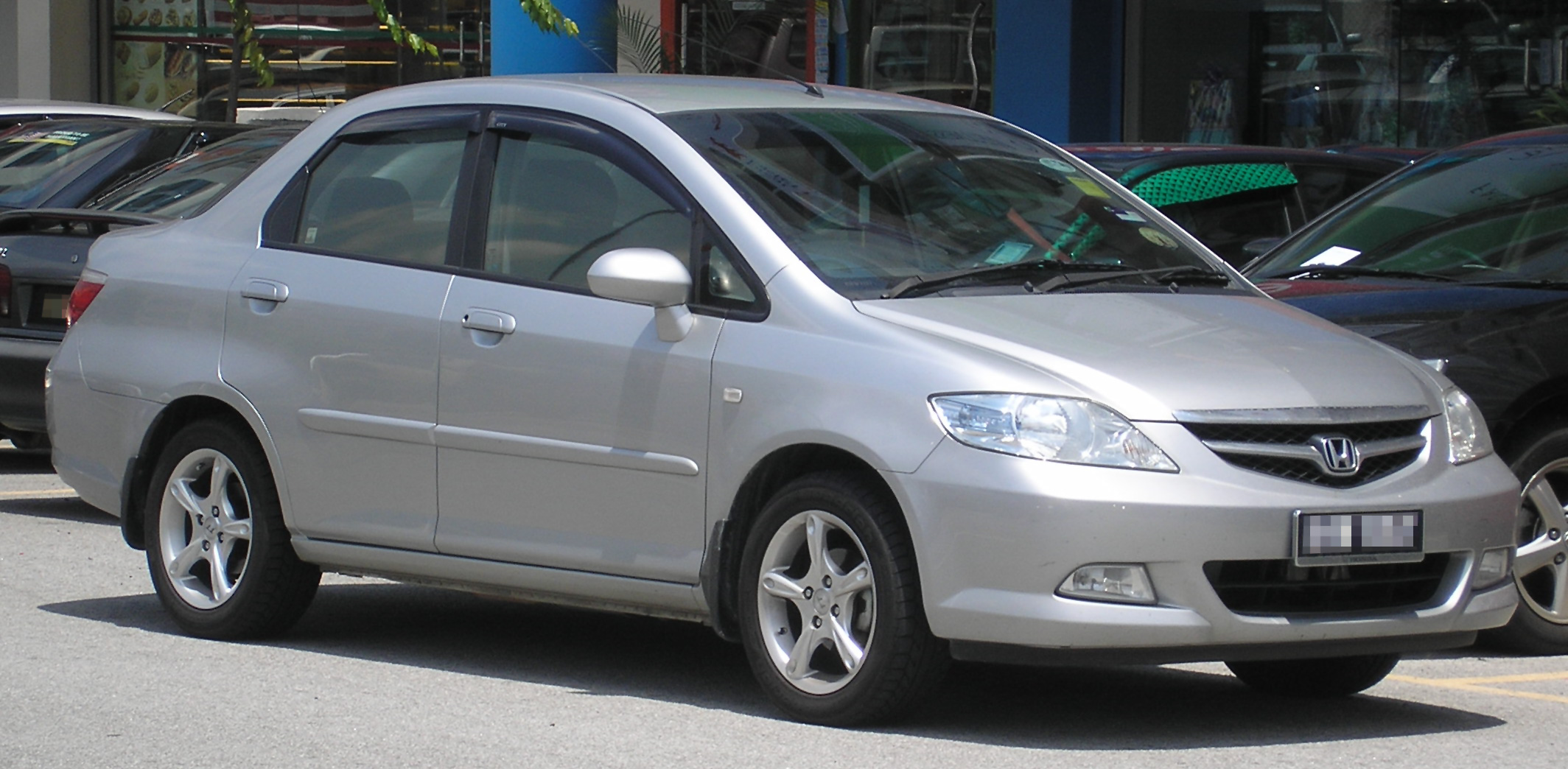

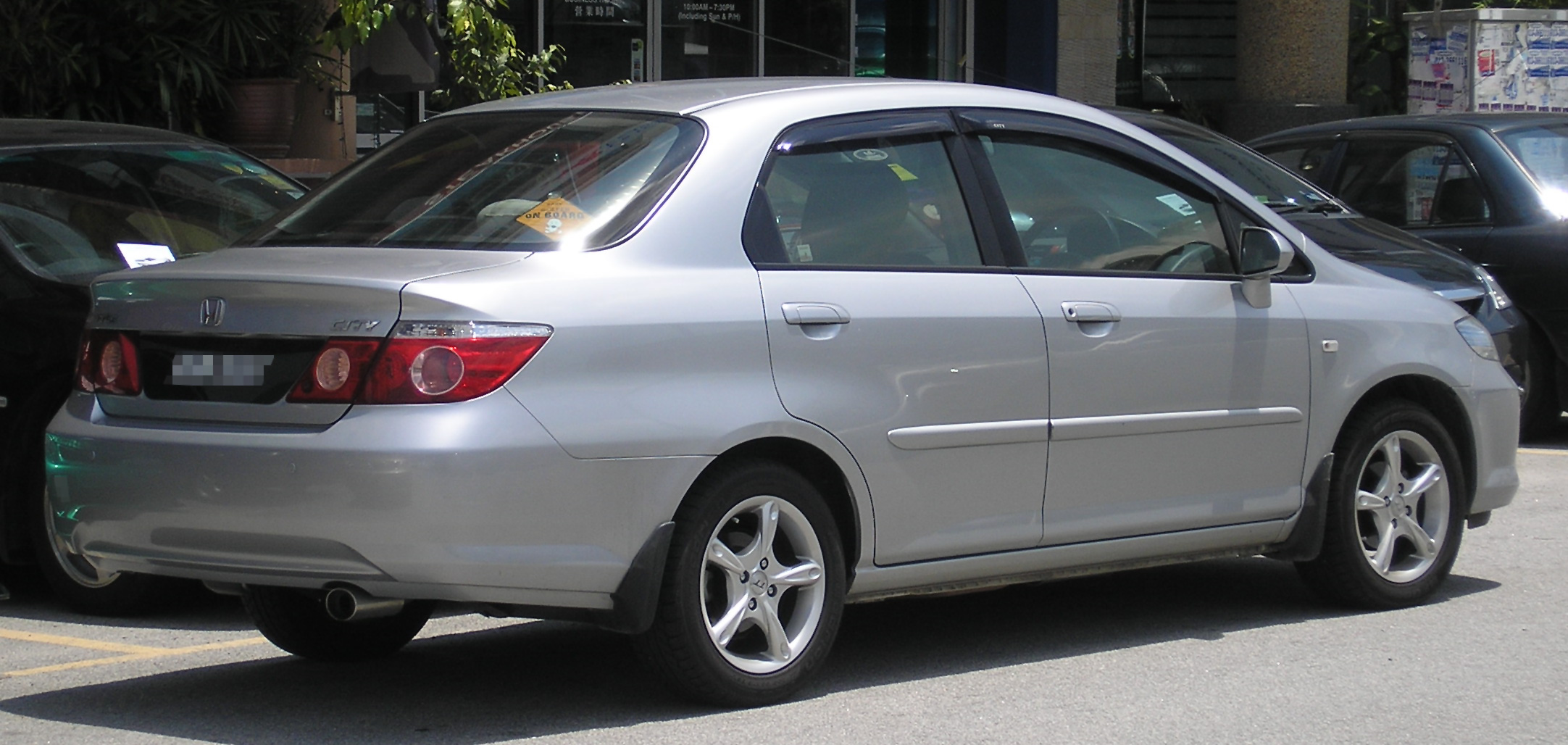
Honda City (first facelift, Malaysia)

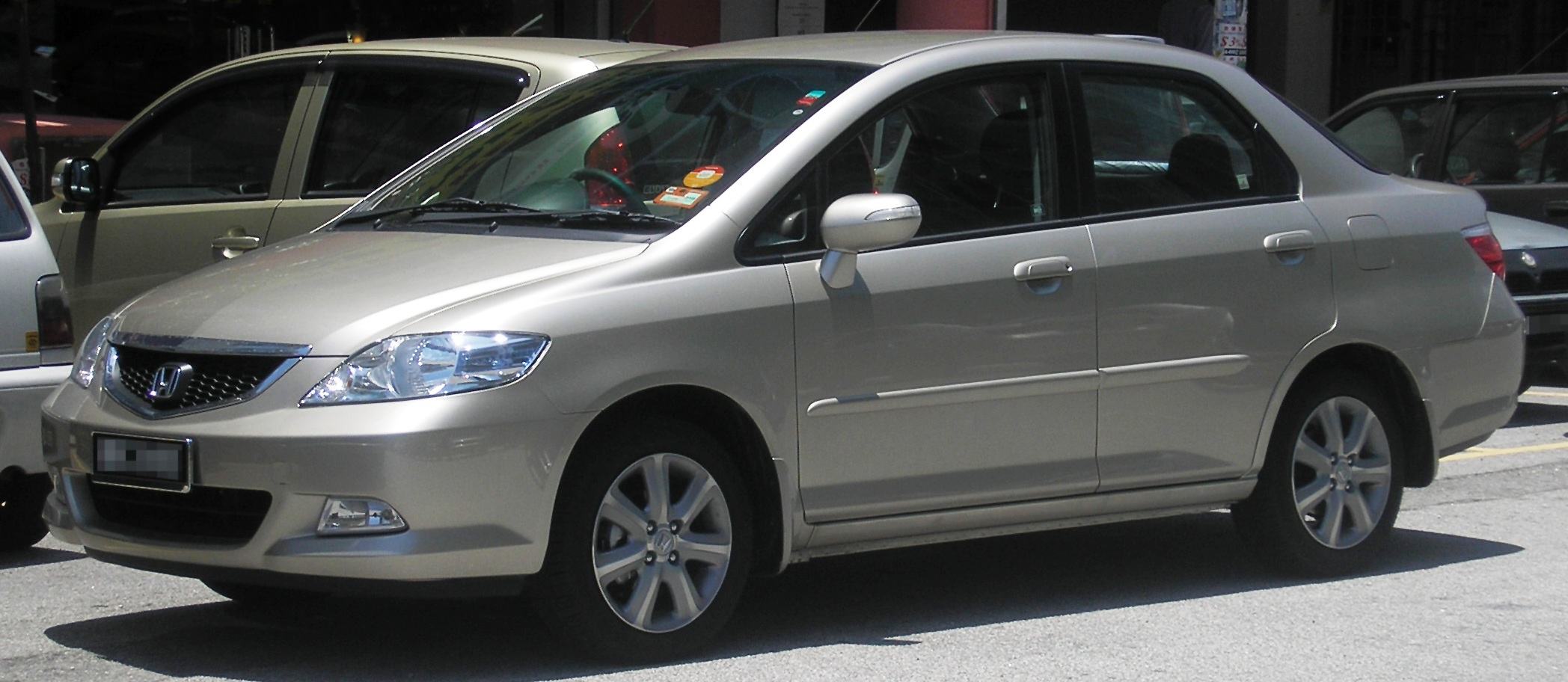
Honda City (second facelift, Malaysia)

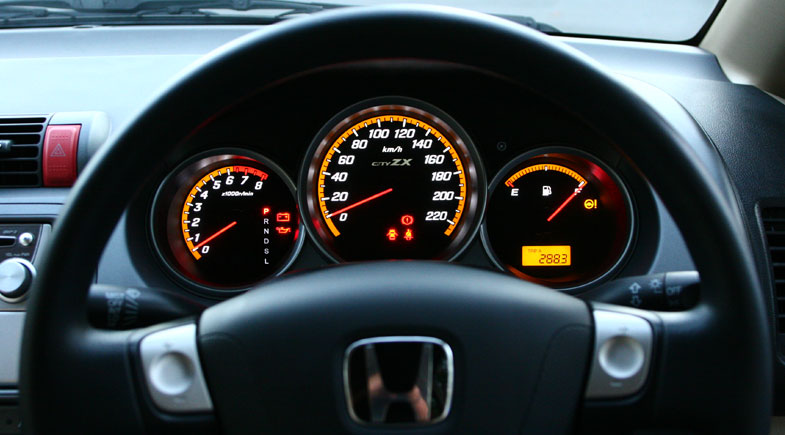
Speedometer dials on a Honda City VTEC model.

In September 2005, a facelifted version of the City was launched in Thailand, in October 2005 in Malaysia, and in November 2005 in Indonesia. In Thailand, it is known as the City ZX. The most significant changes are a new exterior (new front grille, new headlamps, new fog lights, new tail lights and bumpers). The front end has been extended forward by 65 mm (2.6 in) while the rear has been extended by 15 mm (0.6 in). The side mirror is electronically foldable. Both the i-DSI and VTEC trim levels have 15-inch alloy wheels as standard equipment. The changes in interior are minor but it does include an armrest for the driver and additional map lights. The interior colour tone of the VTEC variant is black.

The L-series engine remained but the intake manifold has been repositioned, resulting in a 6 °C drop in the intake air temperature, the suspension has been upgraded as well.

The City in India, Indonesia, Malaysia, Pakistan, the Philippines, Singapore and Thailand uses the CVT gearbox for both i-DSI and VTEC variants. The CVT gearbox for the VTEC simulates a 7-speed automatic transmission with Tiptronic style override using paddle shift buttons on the steering wheel itself.

The fourth generation was resurrected in China as the Everus S1, a new budget car brand for Honda models discontinued elsewhere. The S1 stopped production in 2014.

Models

City/Fit Aria:

- GD6: 1.3 L L13A i-DSI I4 2WD (Fit-Aria)
- GD7: 1.3 L L13A i-DSI I4 4WD (Fit-Aria)
- GD8: 1.5 L L15A i-DSI/VTEC I4 2WD (Fit-Aria)
- GD9: 1.5 L L15A i-DSI/VTEC I4 4WD (Fit-Aria)

=== Everus S1 (China) ===
In 2011, Chinese joint venture Guangqi Honda released a badge-engineered version of the fourth-generation City under their new Everus brand, called the S1. With the release of Everus, Honda became the first foreign automaker to develop vehicles under a brand owned by its local joint venture automaker in China.

The S1 is the first Everus car available for sale. It shares most of the characteristics found in the fourth-generation City. Dimensions and powertrains are identical as well with the S1 sporting the same 4,420 mm length and 1.3-litre i-DSi or 1.5-litre VTEC L-series petrol engine. The engines are paired to either a 5-speed manual or 5-speed automatic transmission. The S1 concluded production in 2014.

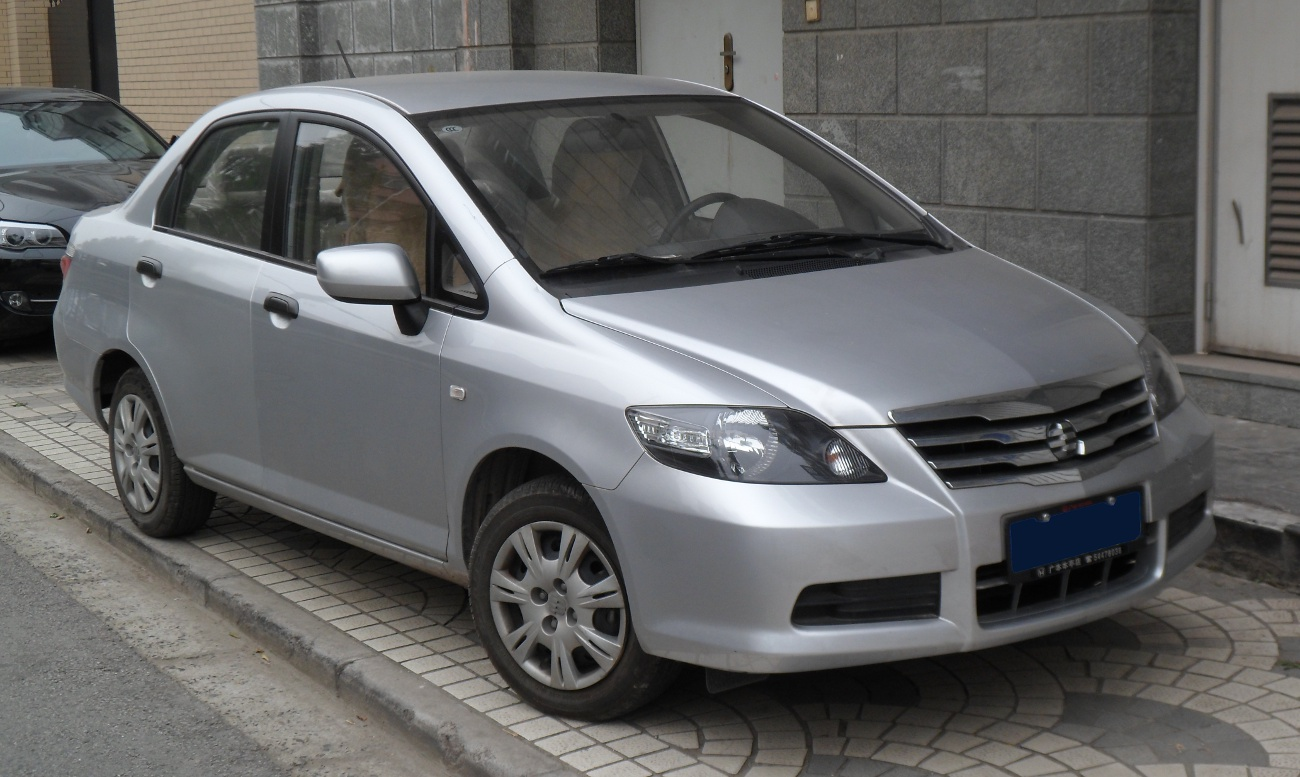
Everus S1 (pre-facelift)

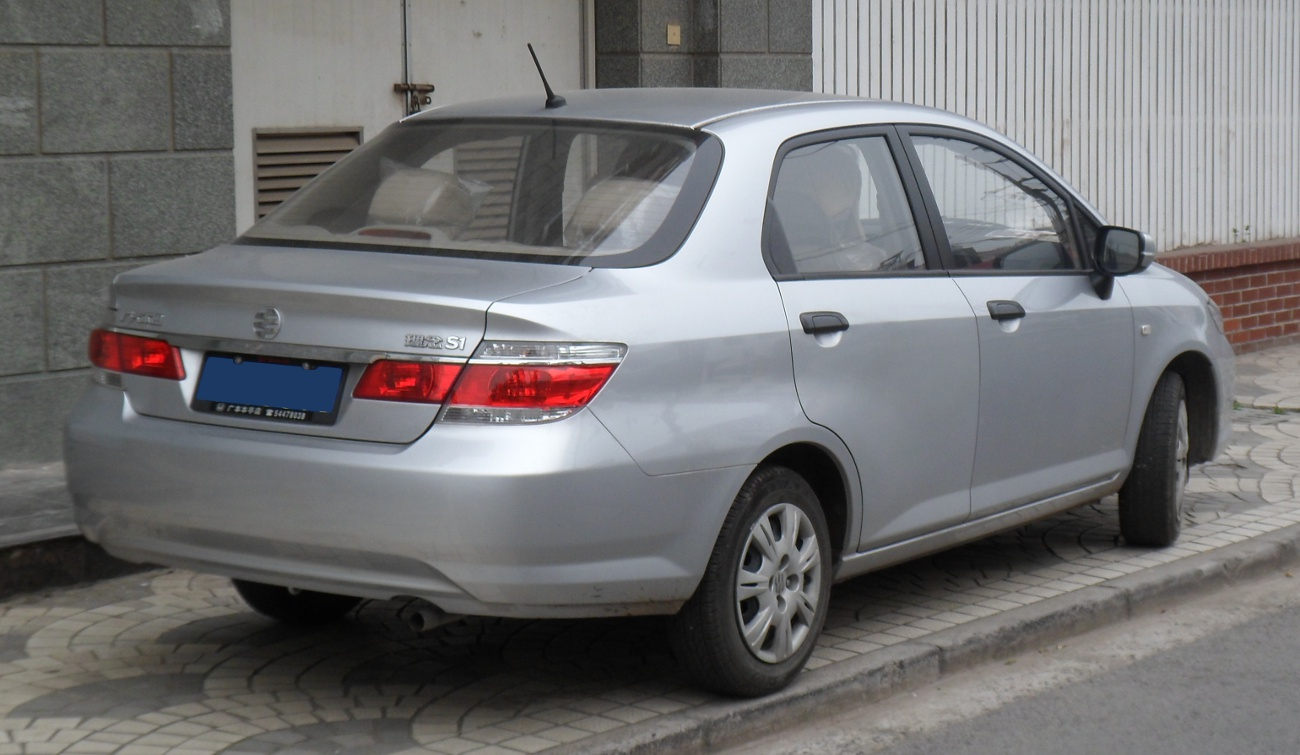
Everus S1 (pre-facelift)

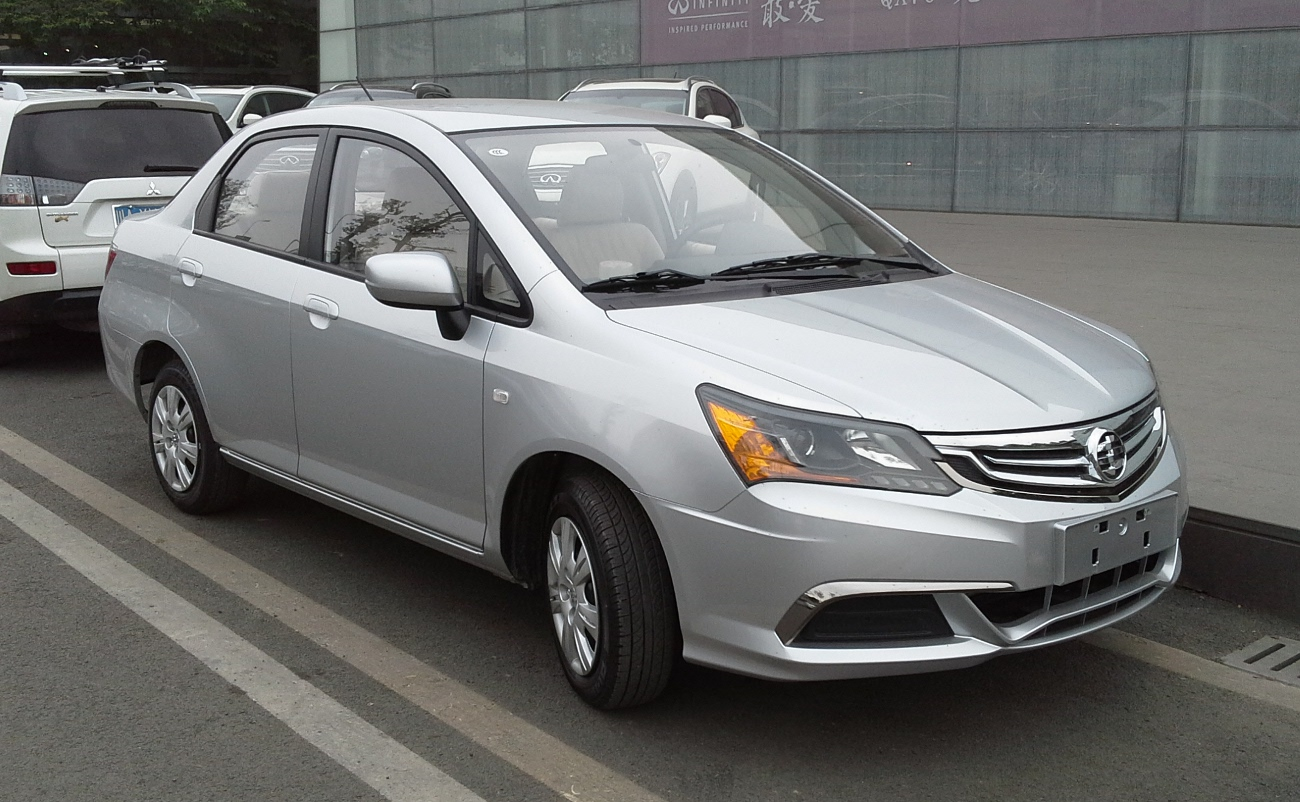
Everus S1 (facelift)

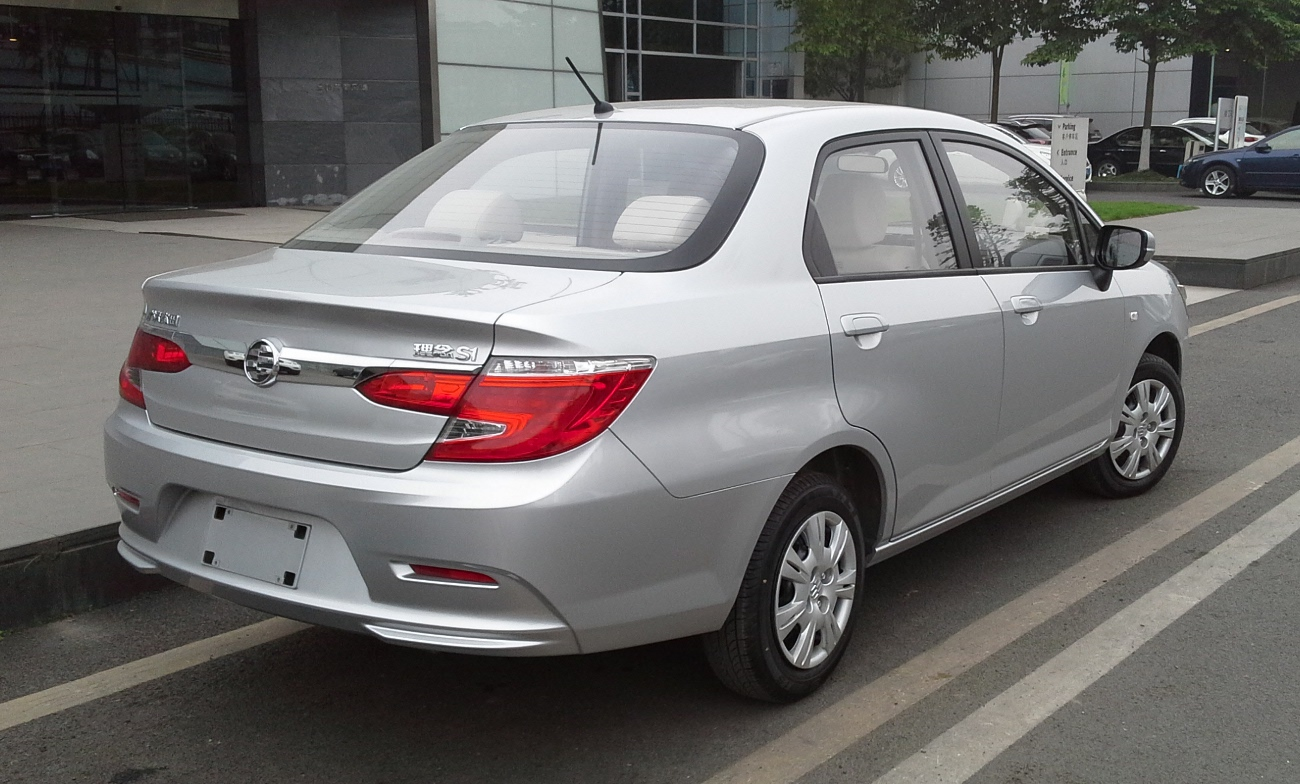
Everus S1 (facelift)

== Fifth generation (GM2/3; 2008) ==
Fifth generation
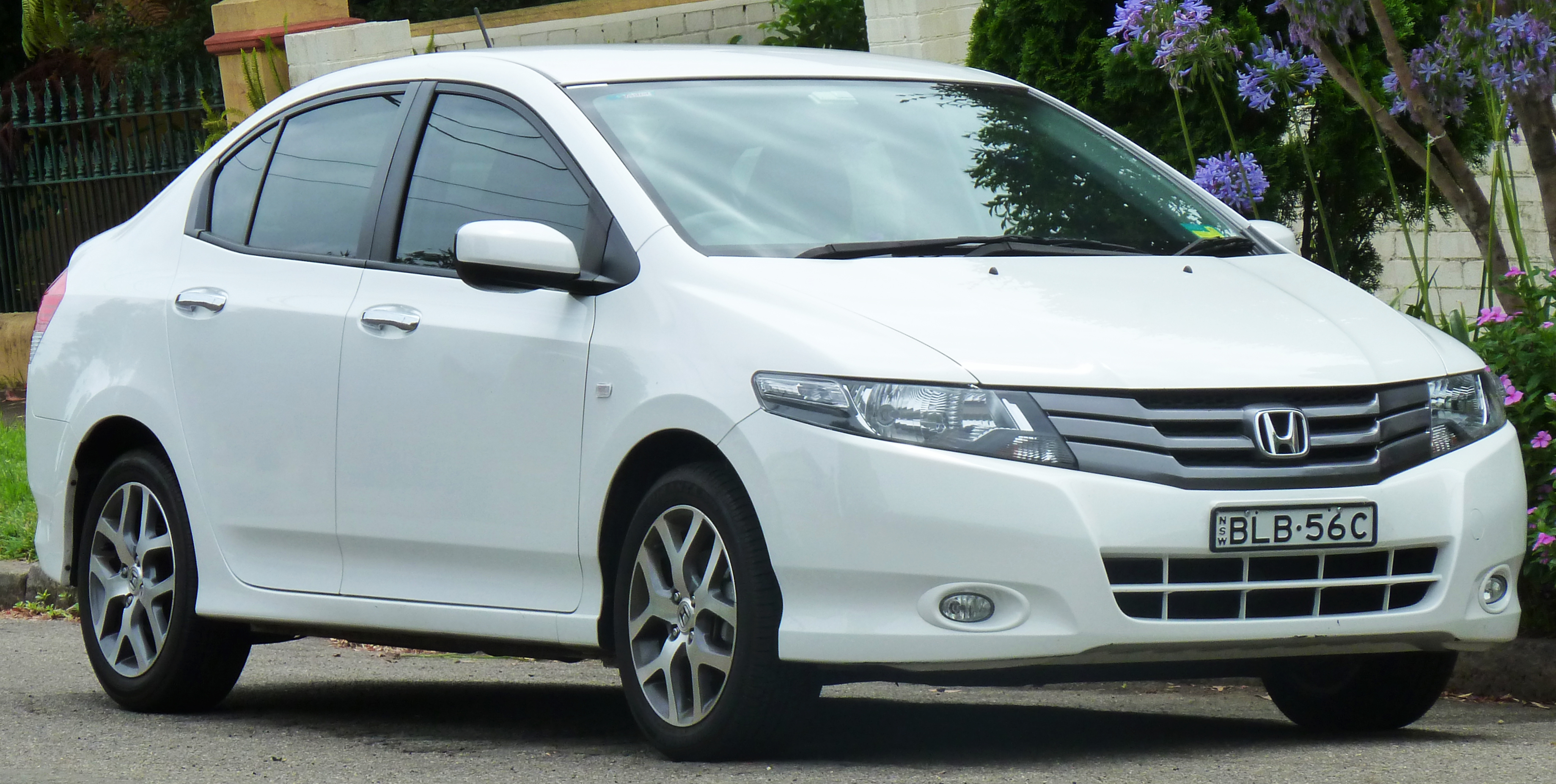

Overview
- Model code: GM2; GM3
- Also called: Honda Ballade (South Africa)
- Production: 2008–2013; 2011–2014 (Argentina); 2009–2021 (Pakistan)
- Assembly: Thailand: Ayutthaya; Malaysia: Alor Gajah, Malacca; Philippines: Santa Rosa, Laguna; China: Guangzhou (Guangqi Honda, JDM and Far East models only); India: Greater Noida (HSCI/HCIL, South Asia models only); Pakistan: Lahore (HACP, West Asia and Middle East models only); Turkey: Çayırova, Kocaeli (Honda Türkiye, Europe and Turkey models only); Brazil: Sumaré, São Paulo (Central America models only); Argentina: Campana, Buenos Aires (South America models only)

Body and chassis
- Body style: 4-door sedan
- Layout: Front-engine, front-wheel-drive
- Related: Honda Fit/Jazz (second generation); Honda Freed (first generation); Honda Insight (second generation)

Powertrain
- Engine: Petrol: 1.3 L L13Z1 I4; 1.5 L L15A7 I4; 1.8 L R18A I4; Petrol/CNG: 1.5 L L15A I4; Diesel: 1.5 L N15 I4 turbo
- Transmission: 5-speed manual 5-speed automatic

Dimensions
- Wheelbase: 2,550 mm (100.4 in)
- Length: 4,420 mm (174.0 in)
- Width: 1,695 mm (66.7 in)
- Height: 1,470 mm (57.9 in)
- Curb weight: 1,095–1,155 kg (2,414–2,546 lb)

The fifth-generation City (third-generation as a sedan) was unveiled in Bangkok, Thailand in September 2008 followed by launches in India, Pakistan, Malaysia, Indonesia, the Philippines, Singapore and China (Guangzhou Honda) in the following months. For the third-generation of the City, Honda has given the car a longer front overhang and wheelbase as well as a lower roof than the hatchback to give it more of an ideal sedan proportions compared to its predecessor.

The City was available with a range of four-cylinder engines include a 1.3-litre engine producing 73 kW (98 hp) at 6,000 rpm, a 1.5-litre engine L15A7 putting out 120 PS (88 kW) (118 hp), which both are available in manual and automatic transmissions with a paddle shifters variant (India, Malaysia, Thailand and Indonesia) For the 1.8-litre R18A engine only produce in (China markets only). In South America the range is offered with the i-VTEC 1.5-litre flex-fuel engine that is shared with the Brazilian Honda Fit. The power output is 115 hp with petrol and 116 hp using ethanol. Manual and automatic gearboxes are available.

The City was also briefly offered in selected European countries including Poland with a 1.4-litre i-VTEC engine mated to either a 5-speed manual or a 6-speed i-SHIFT automated manual transmission.

In the Philippines, the fifth-generation City was launched in 2009 available in two variants: 1.3 S and 1.5 E. The 1.3 S was offered in either 5-speed manual transmission or 5-speed automatic while the E trim was only available in 5-speed automatic transmission with paddle shifters.

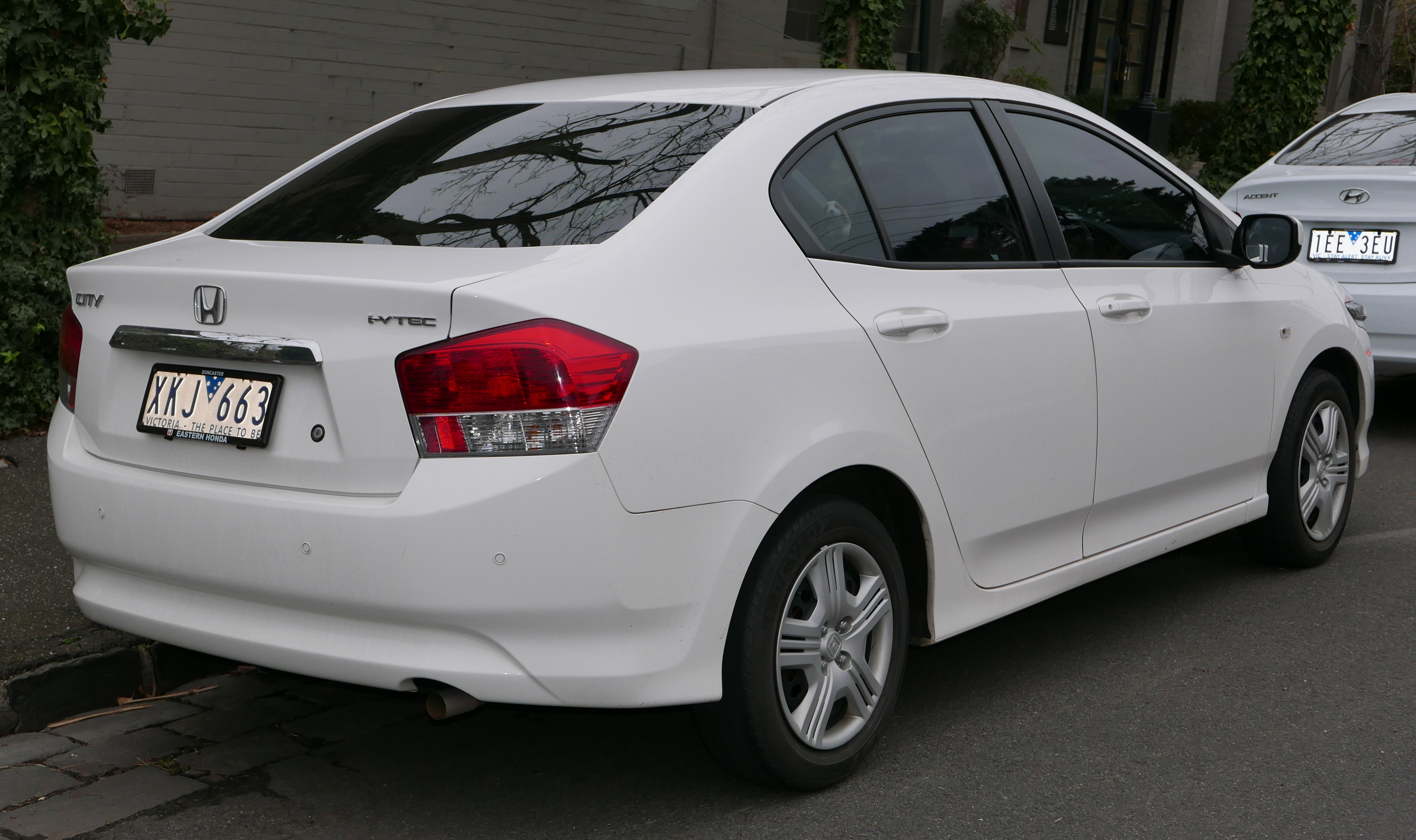
Honda City VTi (Australia; pre-facelift).

It was released in India in November 2008. The City became the best-selling model of the company in the country, with sales volume even surpassing that of Thailand, previously the best selling market for the City. The City has been the leader in the mid-sized sedan segment for a decade, with 35% market share in 2010. In India it came with a 1.5-litre petrol engine mated to a manual transmission or a 5-speed automatic.

In Pakistan, the City was launched on 31 January 2009, just four months after its international debut. It was only offered in 1.3-litre variant but then 1.5 was launched after a few years. It was available with either a manual or an automatic transmission, with engine options of 1.3L and 1.5L. It was available in aspire and non aspire variants

In February 2009, Honda Australia released the Thai-made City into the Australian market in two 1.5-litre variants (VTi and VTi-L). According to a Honda Australia executive, Yasuhide Mizuno, the City would compete with other light sedans such as the Japanese built Toyota Yaris, the Korean-made Holden Barina and the Nissan Tiida. This was the first City released in Australia since the 1980s. It replaced the formerly smaller-sized Civics.

The City was launched in 2011 in South Africa as the Ballade, to fit below the Civic and above the Jazz sold there.

=== Facelift ===
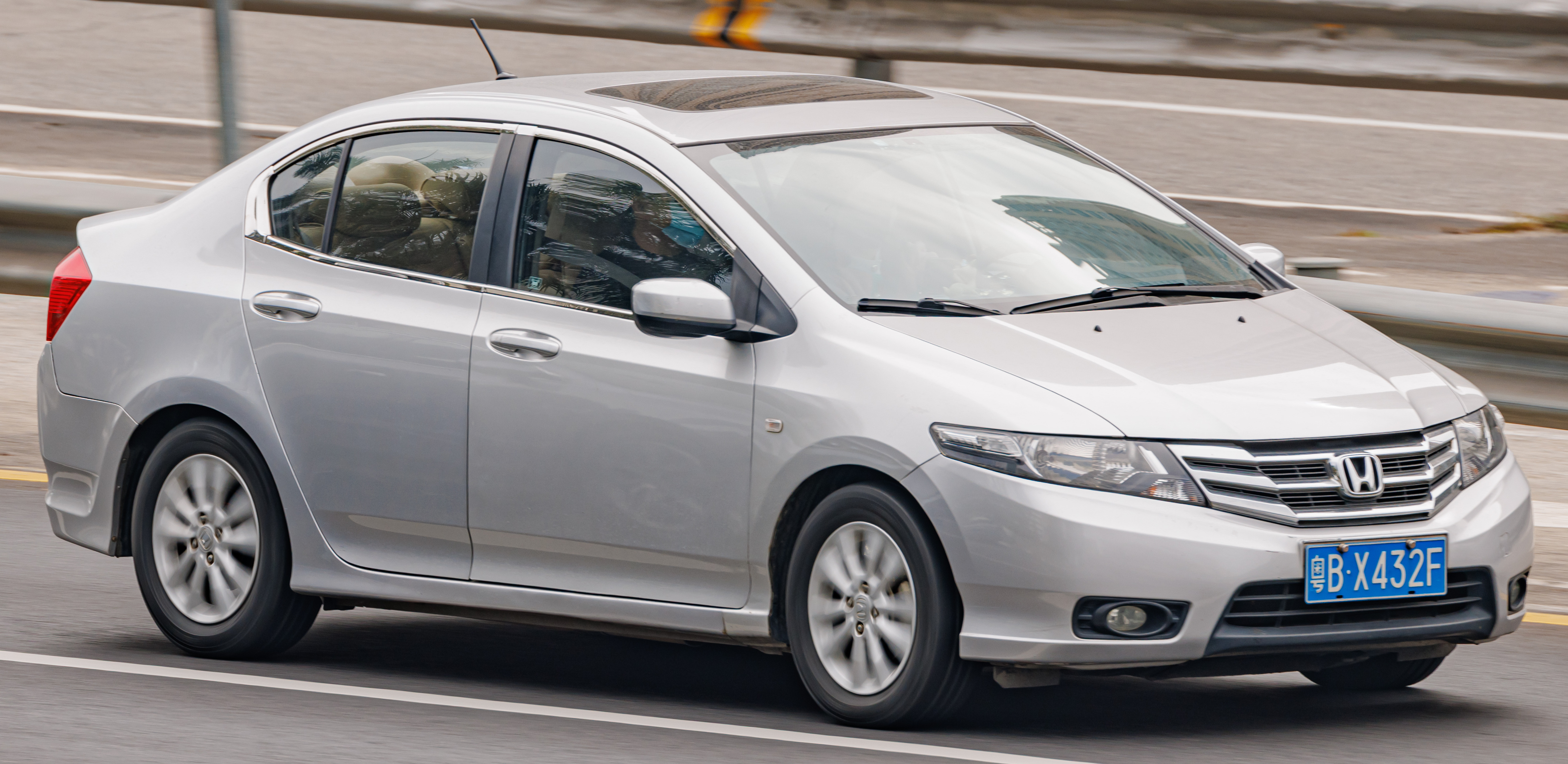

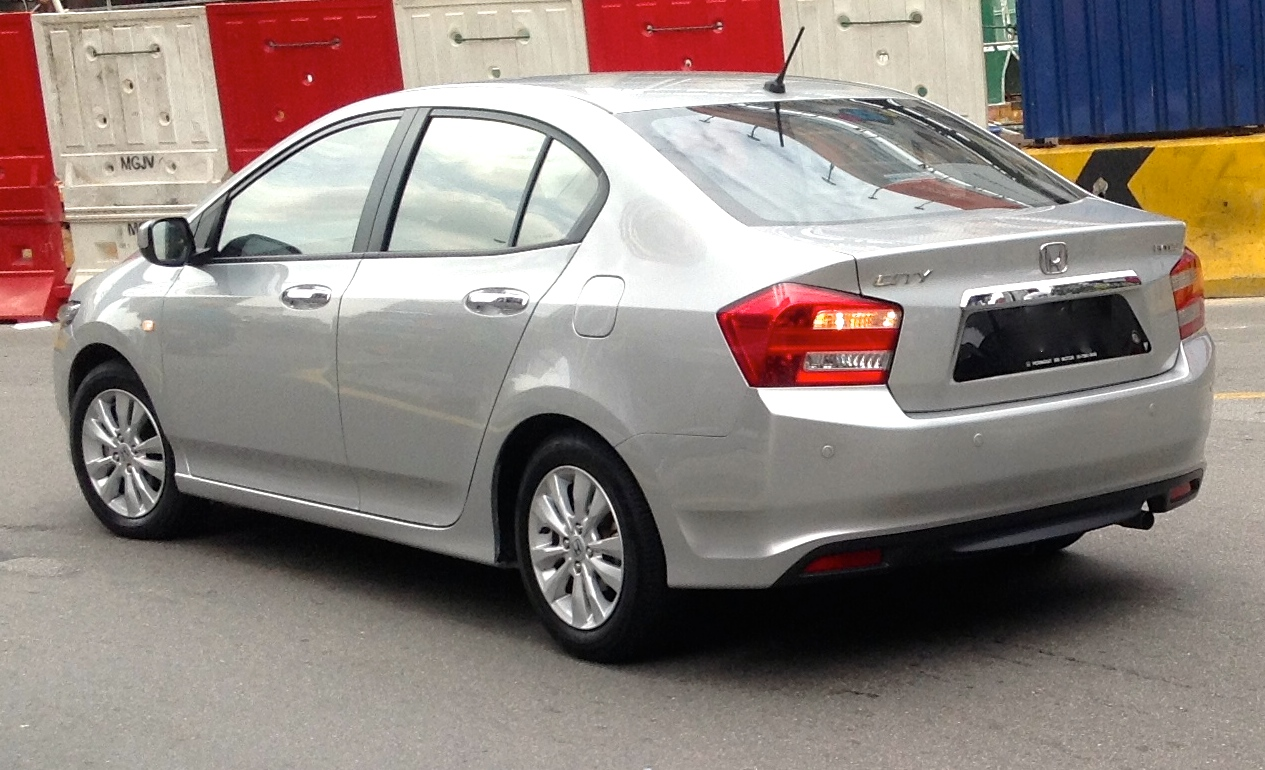
Honda City (facelift)

In September 2011, Honda Thailand revealed the revamped City, with new front grille design, new front and rear bumpers, new taillamps design, new alloy wheels, eco driving indicator and dual front airbags to every model. The revised model was launched in India in December 2011 including five variants – Corporate, E, S, V and V (Sunroof) – and increased ground clearance to 165 mm (previously 160 mm) and also length increased by 20 mm.

In August 2012, Honda Thailand released the City CNG.

The facelifted City was also launched in the Philippines in early 2012. It had a redesigned front grille, front and rear bumper and new alloy wheels for the 1.5 E model, blue illumination gauge and silver accent air conditioning switch. In 2013, a new designed alloy wheels was introduced for both 1.3 and 1.5 variants. A Modulo version was available in both models and in 2013 a Mugen version was available for the 1.5 model only.

Honda Cars India launched the facelifted fifth-generation City in India. All variants were powered by the same 1.5-litre i-VTEC petrol engine which delivers 118 PS (87 kW; 116 hp) of power with 146 Nm of maximum torque.

The diesel version of the City was launched in India in early January 2014, powered by the 1.5-litre Earth Dreams i-DTEC turbodiesel engine. It was only manufactured in a limited numbers and were distributed to some selected dealers in some states of India.

Honda Atlas (Pakistan) resumed the production of City on 1 May 2012, after it was halted due to supply chain disruption caused by massive flooding in Thailand. This resumption of production was marked by Honda as it comes with the range of facelifted City under the banner of City Aspire. In October 2014, Honda Atlas launched the facelifted City, with new features including new taillights, revamped chrome grille, blinkers on side mirrors, rear window brake light, keyless entry system and new bumpers. The interior also received some changes. The speedometer dials were changed from orange to blue optitron. This generation of City remained in production in Pakistan until 2021.

=== Production ===
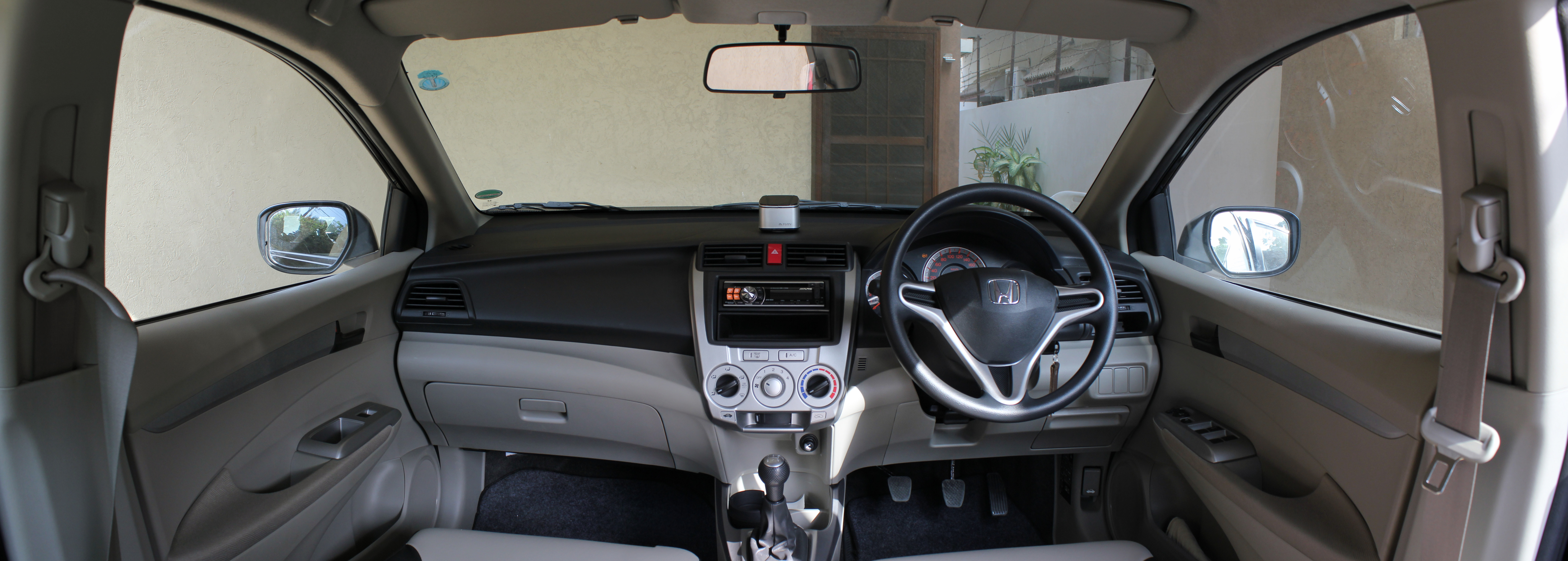
Interior

The City is produced in a number of locations around the world including Brazil, India, Pakistan, the Philippines, Turkey and Thailand.

In July 2009, the City was for the first time to be built and marketed (in large numbers) outside Asia, with production commenced in Sumaré, Brazil. The car was first available for sale in the Brazilian market, with exports to Mexico and other markets in Latin America from September 2009.

Since March 2011, with the opening of a new factory, the City began to be manufactured in Argentina. It is the first car built by Honda in Argentina (and the first Japanese passenger car made in Argentina) and will be exported to all the countries in South America along with the Citys built in the Brazilian Sumaré plant.

=== Safety ===
Latin NCAP 1.0 test results 2012 Honda City sedan (2 airbags) (2012, based on Euro NCAP 1997)
Test	Points	Stars
Adult occupant:	12.03/17.0	4 /5 stars
Child occupant:	37.99/49.00	4 /5 stars

ANCAP test results* Honda City variant(s) as tested (2009)
Test	Score
Overall	4 /5 stars
Frontal offset	14.47/16
Side impact	15.02/16
Pole	Not Assessed
Seat belt reminders	2/3
Whiplash protection	Not Assessed
Pedestrian protection	Adequate
Electronic stability control	Not Available

ANCAP test results* Honda City variant(s) as tested (2009)
Test	Score
Overall	5 /5 stars
Frontal offset	14.47/16
Side impact	15.02/16
Pole	2/2
Seat belt reminders	2/3
Whiplash protection	Not Assessed
Pedestrian protection	Adequate
Electronic stability control	Standard

ASEAN NCAP test results Honda City (2012)
Test	Points	Stars
Adult occupant:	15.44	5 /5 stars
Child occupant:	81%	0 /5 stars
Safety assist:	NA	

== Sixth generation (GM4–9; 2013) ==
Sixth generation
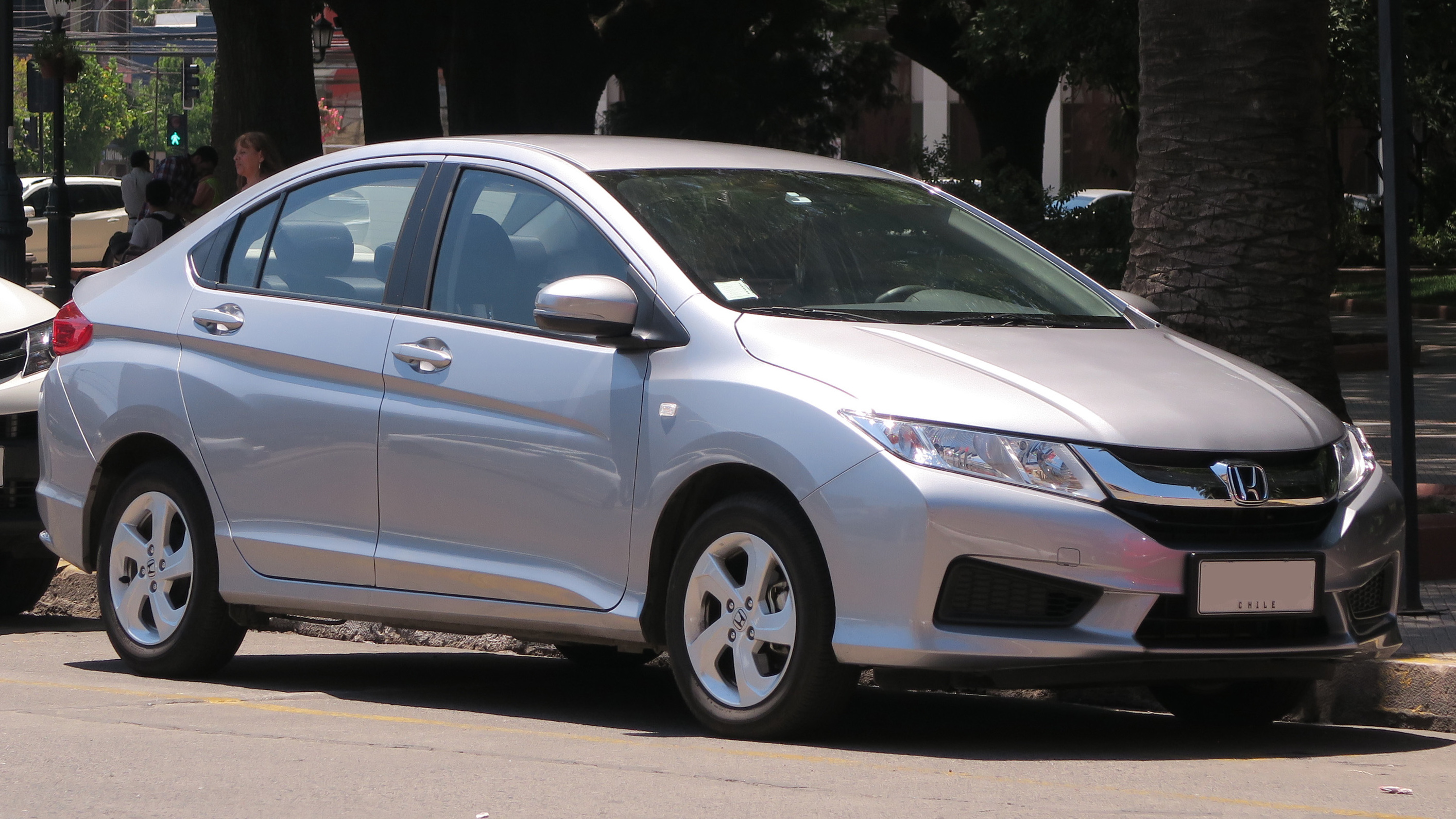
- 2016 Honda City LX (pre-facelift, Chile)

Overview
- Model code: GM4; GM5; GM6; GM8; GM9
- Also called: Honda Grace (Japan); Honda Ballade (South Africa); Honda Greiz (China); Honda Gienia (China, liftback variant)
- Production: November 2013 – 2023; 2014 – August 2020 (Japan); 2015–2019 (China); 2021–present (Pakistan)
- Assembly: Japan: Yorii, Saitama; Thailand: Ayutthaya; Malaysia: Alor Gajah, Malacca; Philippines: Santa Rosa, Laguna; Vietnam: Vĩnh Phúc; China: Guangzhou (Guangqi Honda) (City, domestic); Guangzhou (CHAC) (City, export); Wuhan (Dongfeng Honda) (Greiz/Gienia); Taiwan: Pingtung; India: Greater Noida (HCIL); Pakistan: Lahore (HACP); Brazil: Sumaré, São Paulo
- Designer: Jun Goto and Toshinobu Minami (pre-facelift)

Body and chassis
- Body style: 4-door sedan 5-door liftback (Gienia)
- Layout: Front-engine, front-wheel-drive Front-engine, all-wheel-drive (Grace, Japan only)
- Related: Honda Fit/Jazz (third generation); Honda HR-V (second generation); Honda Freed (second generation); Honda WR-V (first generation); Honda Crider (first generation)

Powertrain
- Engine: Petrol: 1.2 L L12B I4 (Pakistan); 1.5 L L15Z1 I4; 1.5 L L15Z1 FFV I4 (Thailand); Petrol hybrid: 1.5 L LEB-H1 I4; Petrol/CNG: 1.5 L L15A I4; Diesel: 1.5 L N15A I4 turbo
- Electric motor: 29.5 PS (22 kW; 29 hp) Honda H1 Electric Motor Sport Hybrid i-DCD
- Transmission: 5-speed manual 6-speed manual 7-speed DCT; CVT
- Hybrid drivetrain: Honda's Intelligent-Dual Clutch Drive (i-DCD) (City / Grace Hybrid)

Dimensions
- Wheelbase: 2,600 mm (102.4 in)
- Length: 4,442 mm (174.9 in); 4,495 mm (177.0 in) (Greiz); 4,517 mm (177.8 in) (Gienia)
- Width: 1,694 mm (66.7 in); 1,705 mm (67.1 in) (Greiz and Gienia)
- Height: 1,477 mm (58.1 in); 1,489 mm (58.6 in) (Gienia)
- Curb weight: 1,029–1,165 kg (2,269–2,568 lb); 1,109–1,178 kg (2,445–2,597 lb) (Gienia)

Chronology
- Predecessor: Honda Insight (second generation) (Japan)
- Successor: Honda Fit e:HEV (Japan); Honda Insight (third generation) (Japan)

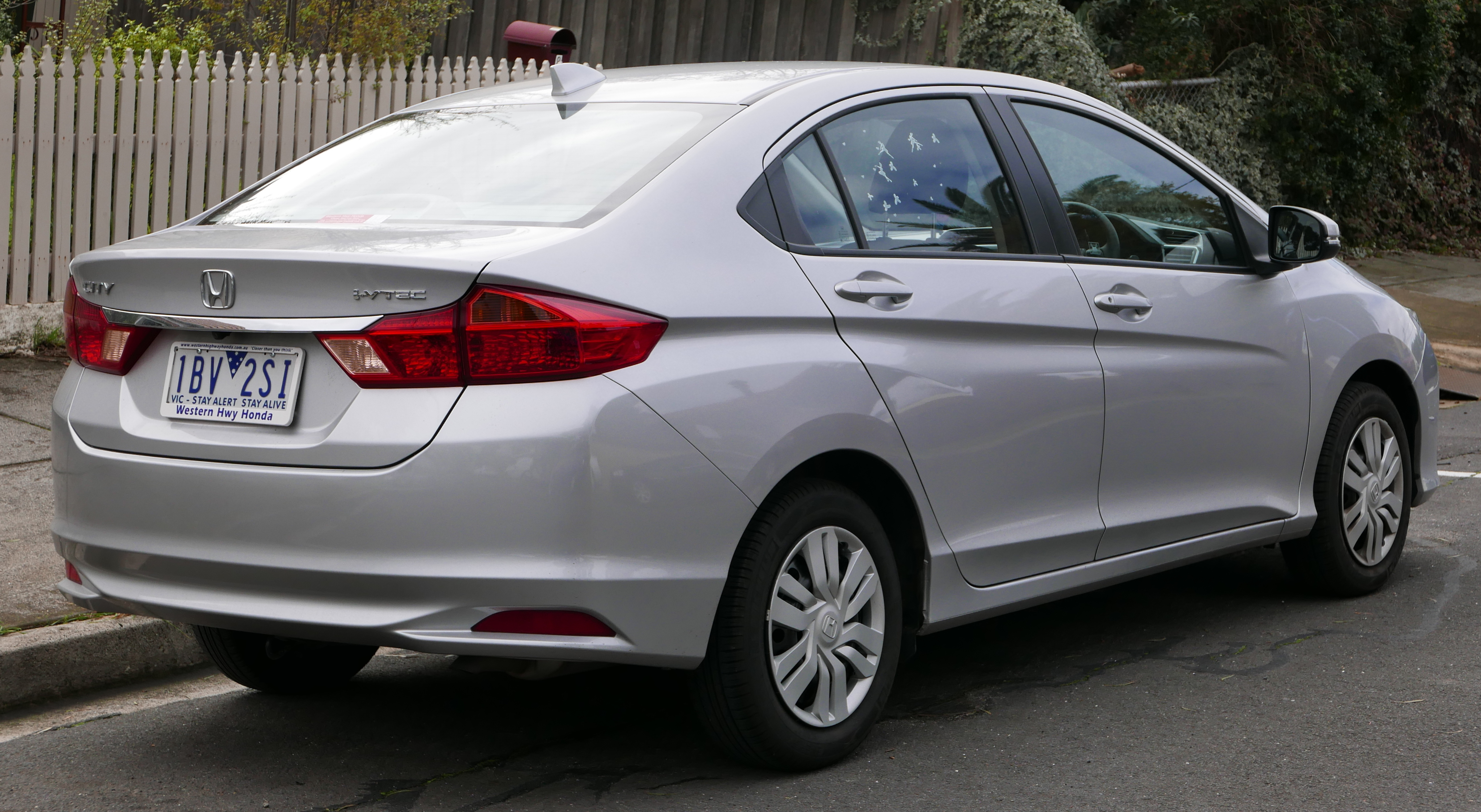
Honda City VTi (Australia; pre-facelift)

The sixth-generation City (fourth-generation as a sedan) is Honda's second model to incorporate the new "Exciting H" design which was first seen on the third-generation Fit/Jazz that launched in September 2013. It also won the award of 'Middle East Car of the Year 2014'. It is continued to be built on the Fit/Jazz platform.

The notable change of this generation is the repositioning of the fuel tank from the middle to the rear of the vehicle. This allowed the seating position to be lowered to give a sportier driving feel, while the height of the roof also lowered to achieve lower centre of gravity and sleeker exterior design.

The new City in its range topping trim features extensive premium equipment and kits, such as touch-panel auto climate control, rear AC vents, a 5-inch LCD screen with navigation, Bluetooth audio, a reverse camera, eight speakers, and four power outlets. Based on Honda's new "Exciting H-Design" philosophy, the sedan gave a more refreshing and a premium look than its predecessor. The overall height is increased by 10 mm, while rest of the dimensions remain the same.

A new hybrid variant was also introduced, though only exclusive to Japan (as the Grace) and Malaysia (as the City). It uses Honda's Intelligent-Dual Clutch Drive (i-DCD) Sport Hybrid system, paired with a 7-speed dual clutch transmission. It is powered by a hybridised version of the 1.5-litre SOHC i-VTEC engine, making a combined output of 132 PS (97 kW; 130 hp) and 178 N⋅m (131 lb⋅ft), equivalent to that of a conventional 1.8-litre engine. In Japan, range topping variant of the hybrid received a dual projector lens similar to the Honda Vezel, and receiving LED tail lamps in its hybrid models only.

=== Facelift ===
The mid-life facelift for the sixth-generation City was launched in Thailand on 12 January 2017. The facelift includes visual and equipment updates such as LED headlamps with daytime running lights and LED tail lights, while the revised chrome bar grille is similar to that of its bigger sibling, the Civic. The facelift model was also subsequently launched in India on 14 February 2017, in Malaysia on 2 March 2017, in Indonesia on 16 March 2017, in the Philippines on 22 May 2017 and in Japan as the Grace in July 2017.

The top-variant of the hybrid in Japan received minor changes to the exterior, receiving the same Daytime-running light in headlamp design as the petrol Honda City models.

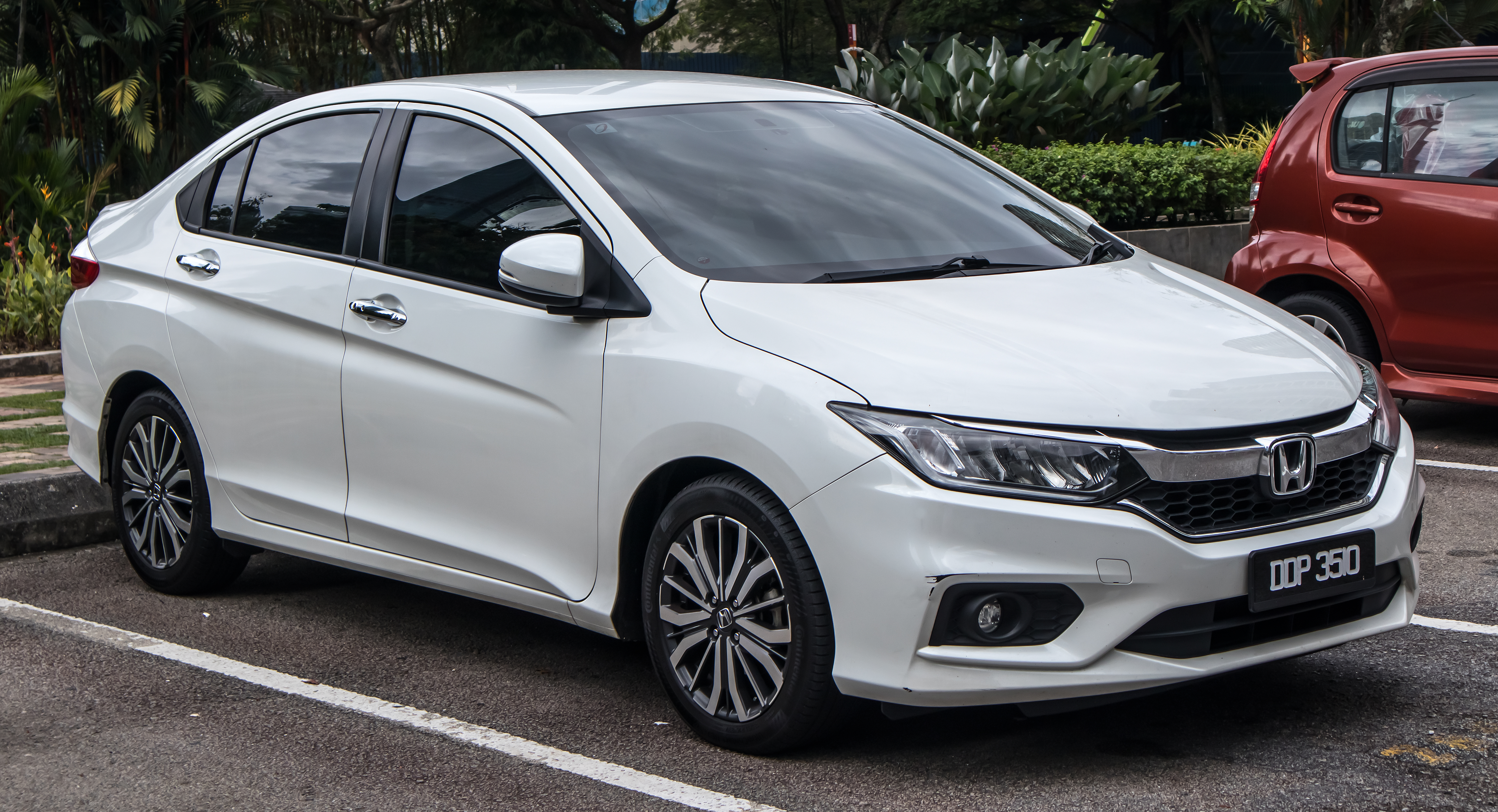
Honda City (Malaysia; facelift)

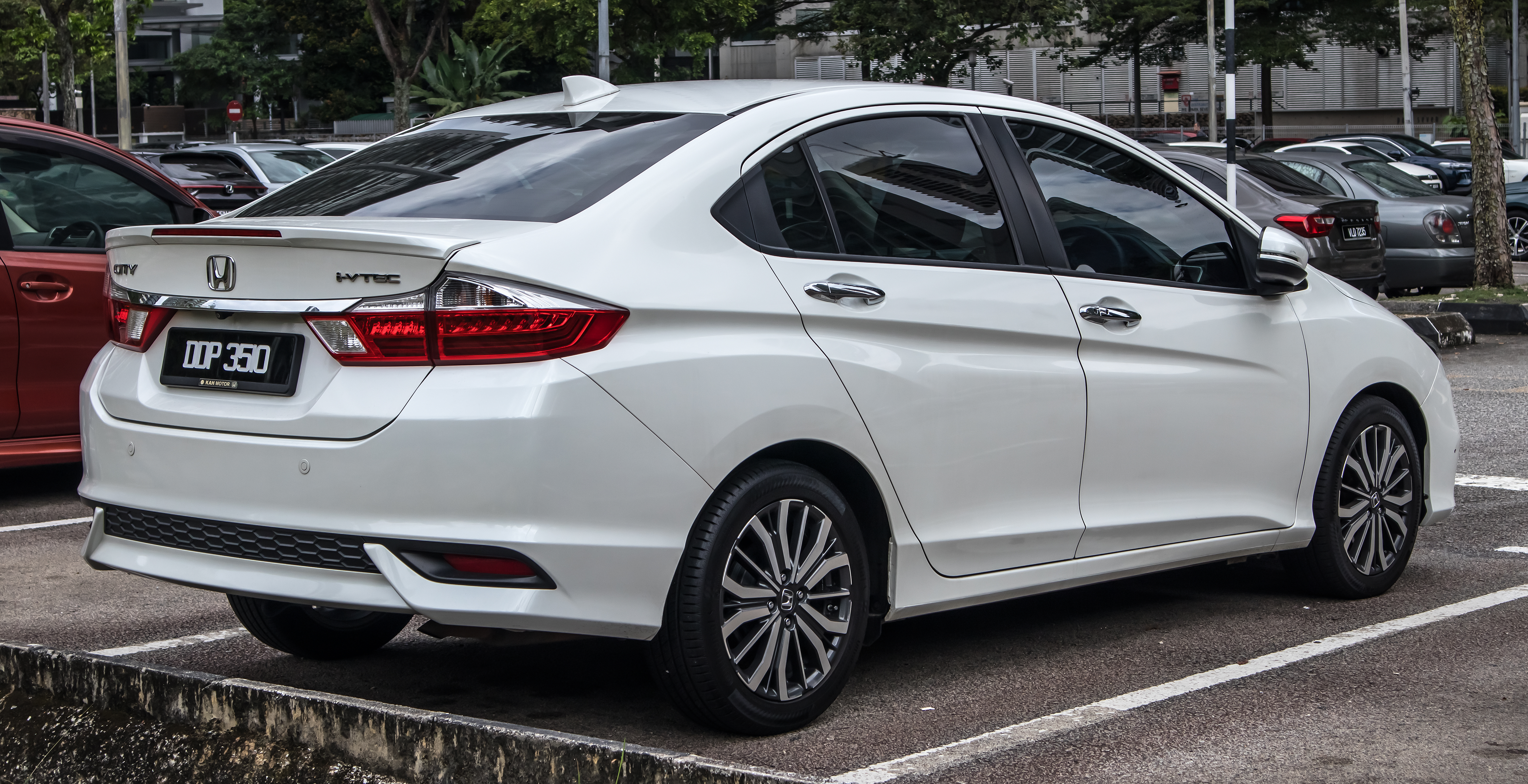
Honda City (Malaysia; facelift)

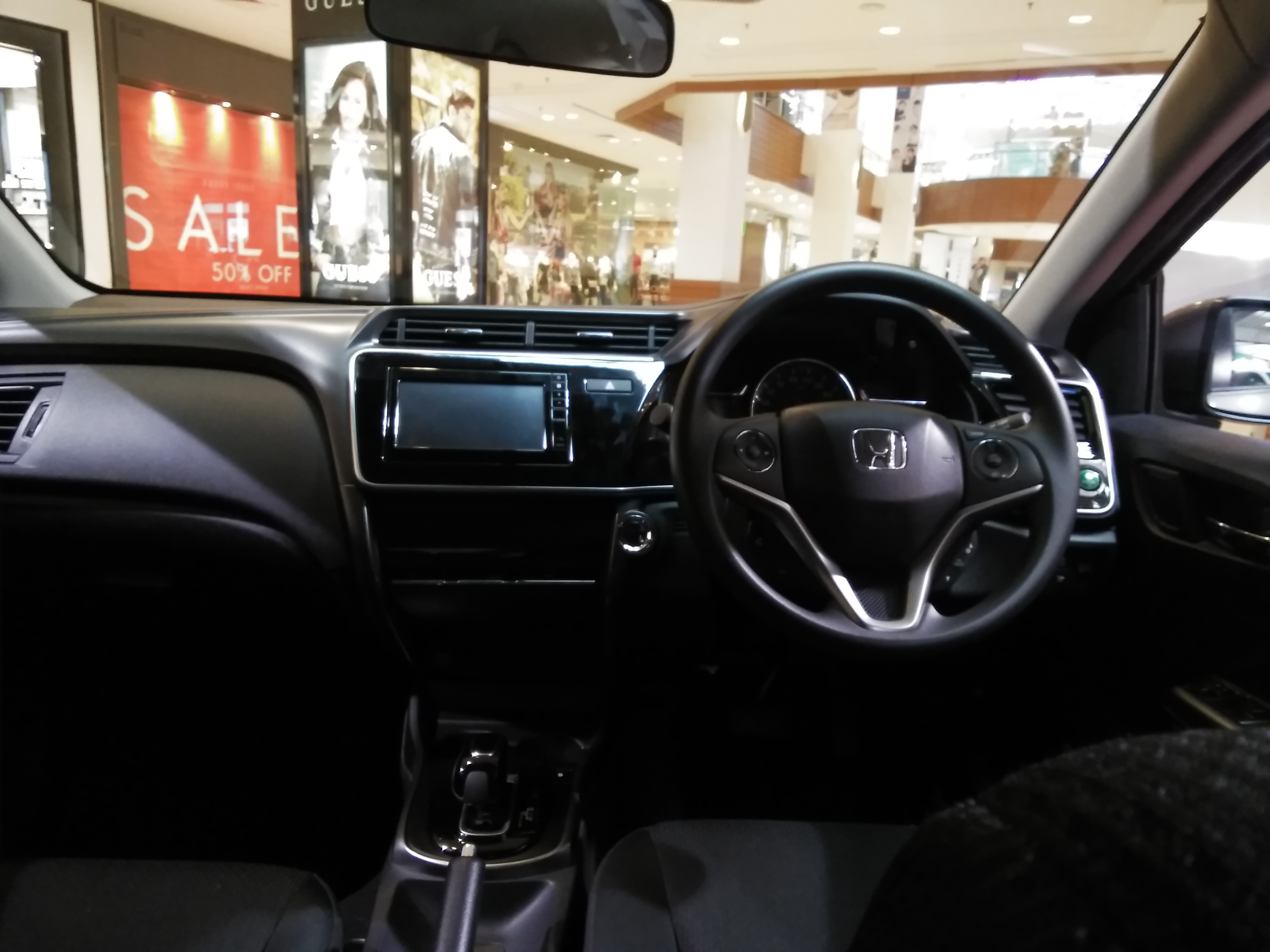
Interior (City Hybrid, Malaysia)

=== Markets ===
==== Brazil ====
The fifth-generation City was introduced in Brazil in 2015. Following the current Fit, both were produced at the Sumaré plant. Only the 1.5-litre petrol engine is available, with either manual transmission or CVT. It is not equipped with direct injection.

==== China ====
In China, the City is manufactured by Guangqi Honda, where there is another derived model, Honda Greiz (Chinese: 哥瑞; pinyin: Gēruì), manufactured by Dongfeng Honda, with different body lines, front and rear fascias. Another derivative called the Honda Gienia (Chinese: 竞瑞; pinyin: Jìngruì) is the City in liftback form. Production for the Greiz commenced in November 2015 while the Gienia commenced production in October 2016.

Trim levels for the Greiz are the Classic, Comfort, Fashion and Luxury all shared with the Gienia. The L15B is the only engine option available paired with a 5-speed manual (for Classic) or CVT gearbox.

Apart from Dongfeng Honda and Guangqi Honda, Honda Automobile (China) also manufactured the City for exports to Mexico.

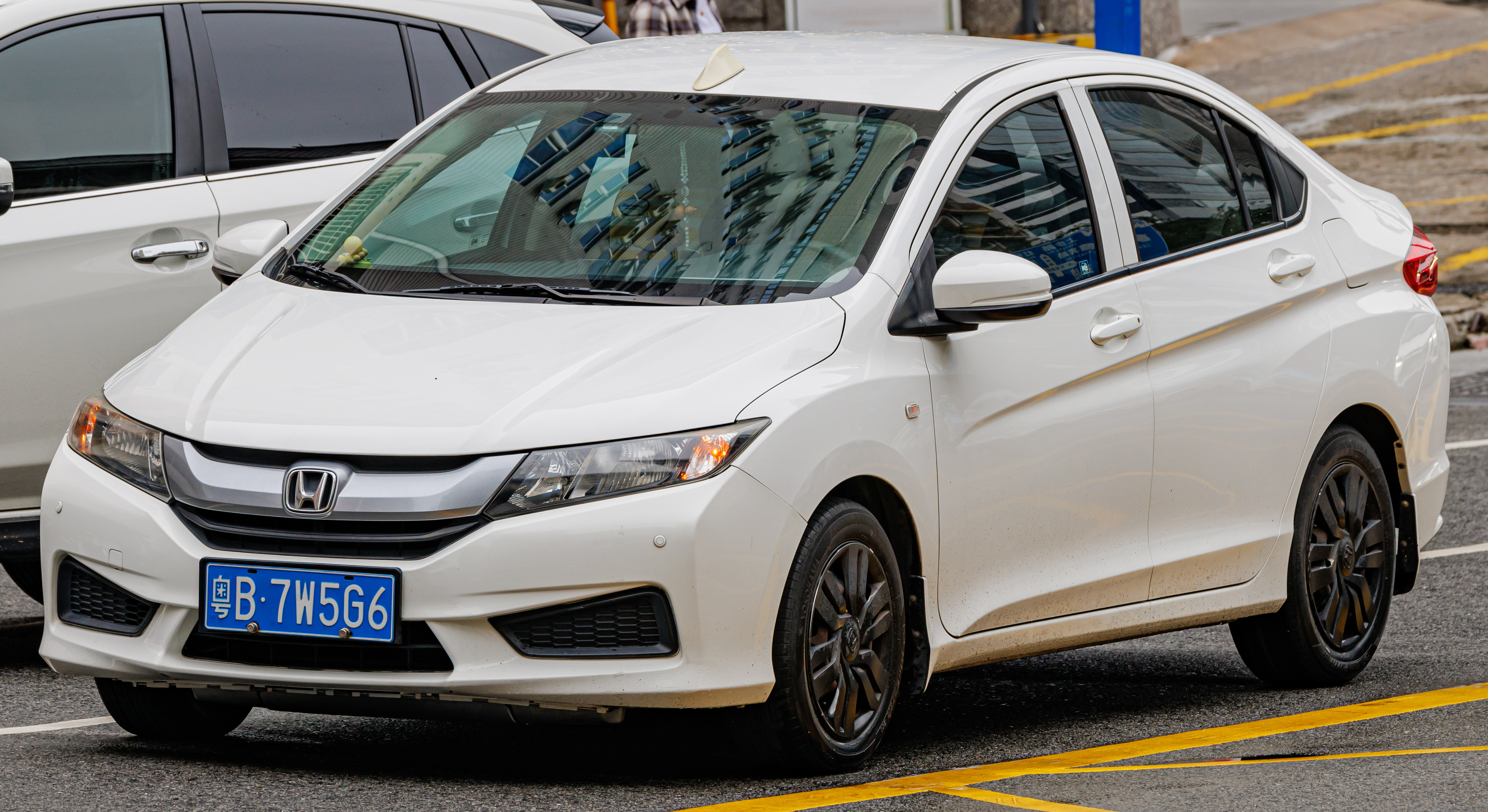
Honda City (China, pre-facelift)

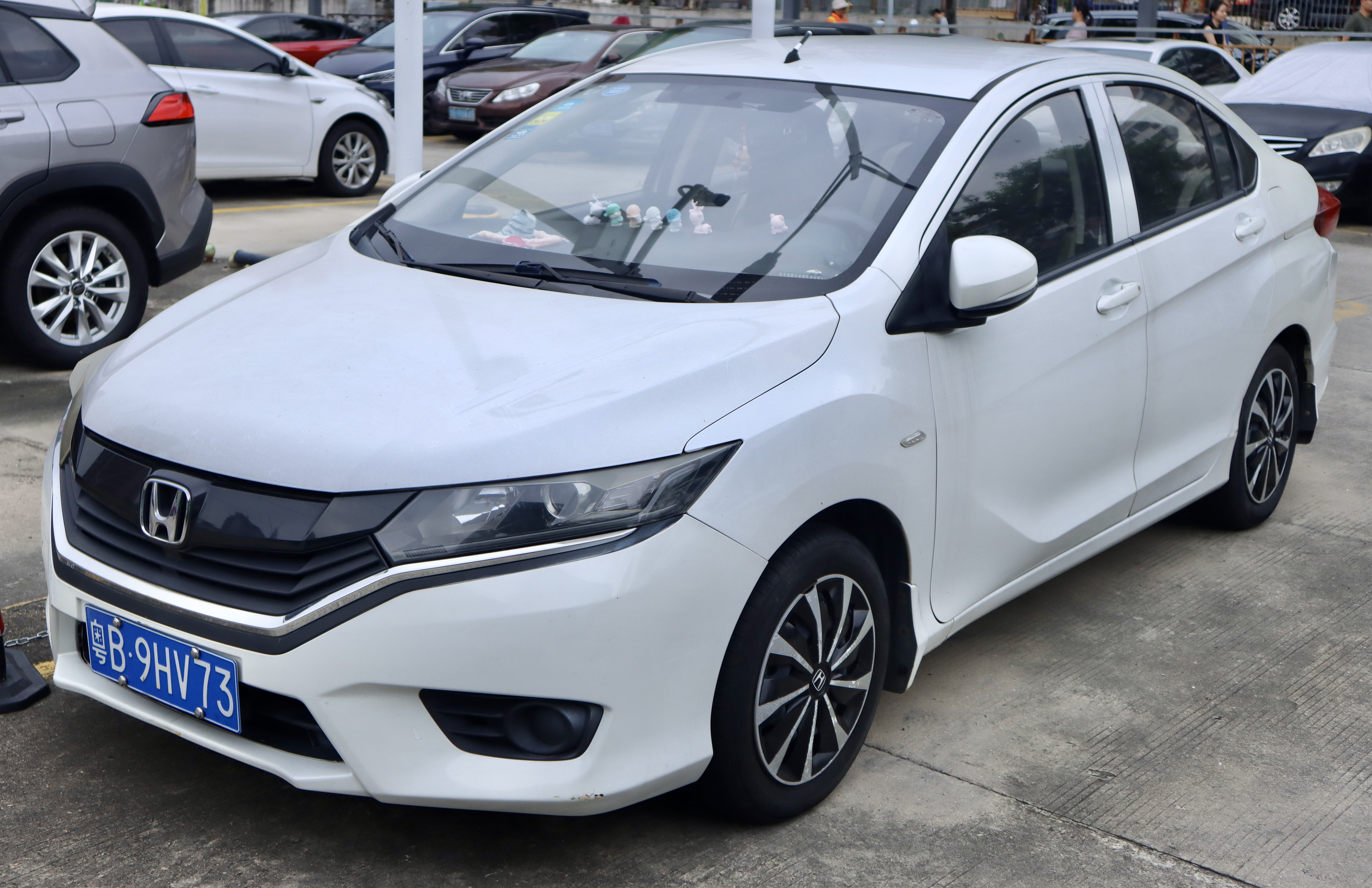
Honda Greiz (China)

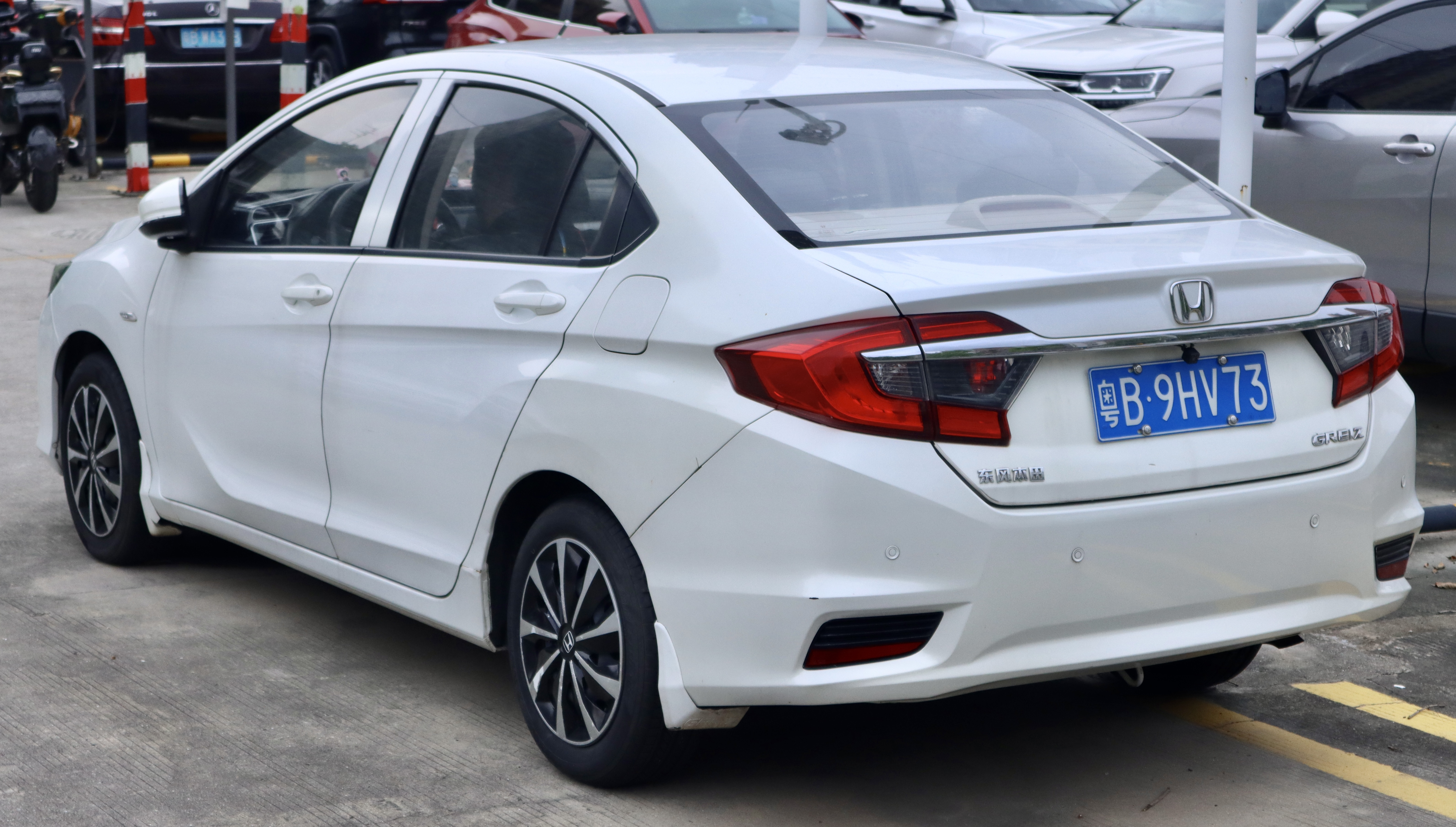
Honda Greiz (China)

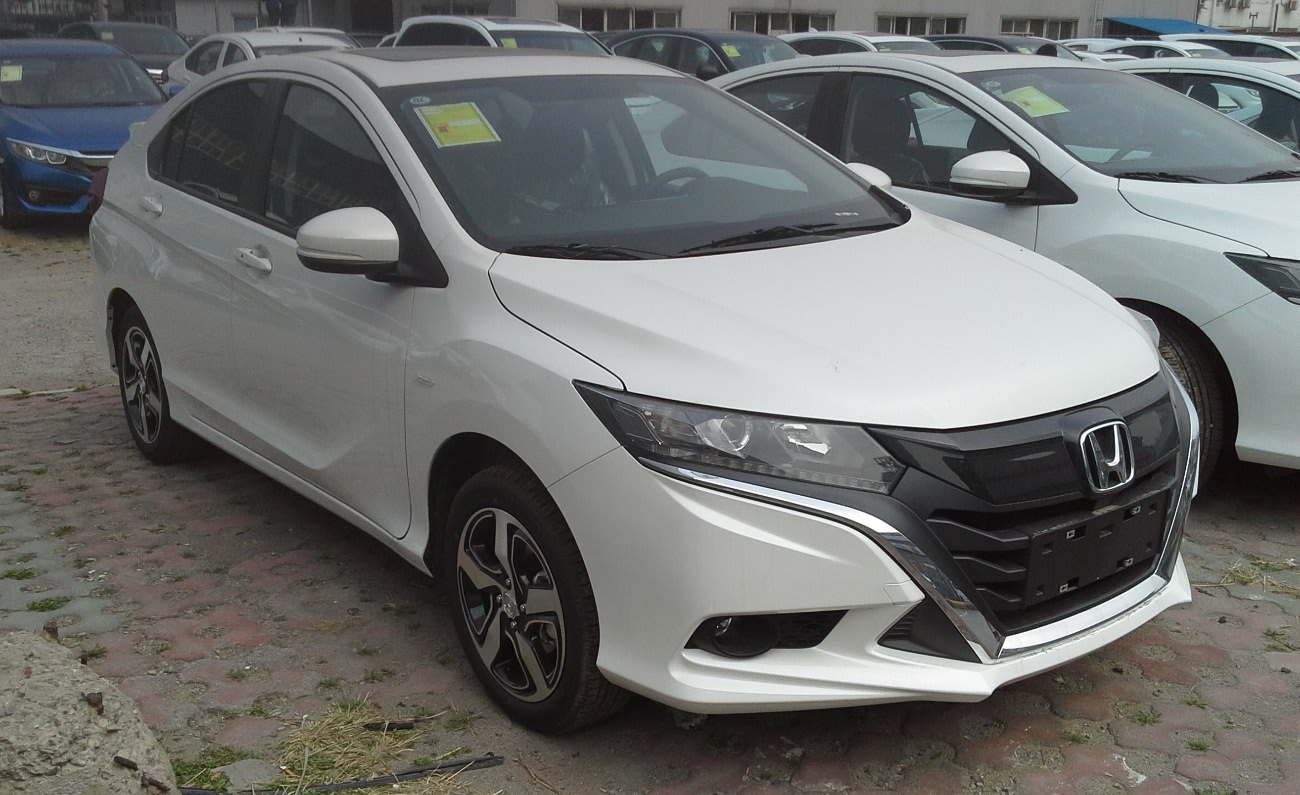
Honda Gienia (China)

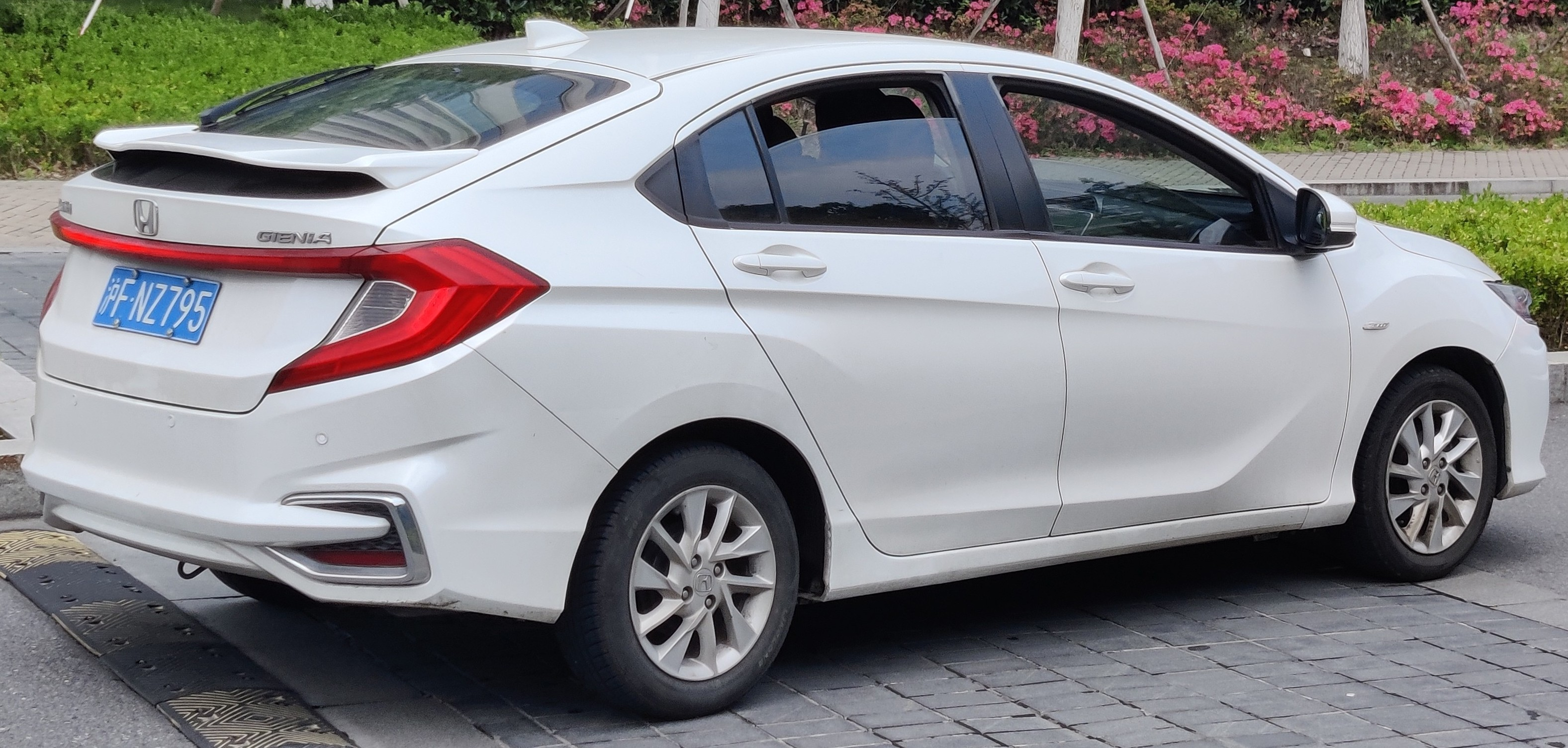
Honda Gienia (China)

==== India ====
The sixth-generation City was unveiled in India on 25 November 2013 and is available with a choice of two engines; a new 1.5-litre Earth Dreams i-DTEC turbodiesel and a refined version of the 1.5-litre i-VTEC petrol. The new 1.5-litre turbo-diesel engine, which also powers the Honda Amaze.

Honda launched the sixth-generation City in India on 7 January 2014. The sixth-generation City is available in five trim levels – E, S, SV, V and VX for both petrol and diesel. The petrol automatic is available in SV and VX trim levels. While the City has always been a popular offering of Honda in India, its sales doubled after it was launched with a diesel engine.

In March 2015, the City became the fastest selling compact sedan to reach the 100,000 mark in just 15 months and is locally assembled with roughly 90% local parts.

From April 2015, the City is available with an additional trim levels: VX (O). It is positioned above the VX.

In 2017, with the facelift, Honda launched a new top-of-the-line ZX trim in India which comes with 6 airbags, rear parking camera and Honda's digipad infotainment system. The facelifted City also comes with full LED headlamps and tail lamps and also a sunroof. Over 10,000 orders were received in less than a month after the facelifted 2017 City was released in mid-February 2017. The City became India's best selling compact sedan for the first half of 2017.

==== Japan ====
The City is offered and sold as Honda Grace in Japan starting from December 2014, with both petrol and hybrid versions, and an all-wheel-drive option. trim levels range from LX, Hybrid EX, Hybrid LX and Hybrid DX. Hybrid versions can be differentiated from its LED rear lamp clusters and on the Hybrid LX and Hybrid DX only, LED projector headlamps come as standard. The exterior dimensions are compliant with Japanese government dimension regulations and the engine displacement incurs a nominal annual road tax obligation. The Grace was discontinued in the Japanese market in August 2020 alongside the Civic sedan and Jade, due to decreasing sales.

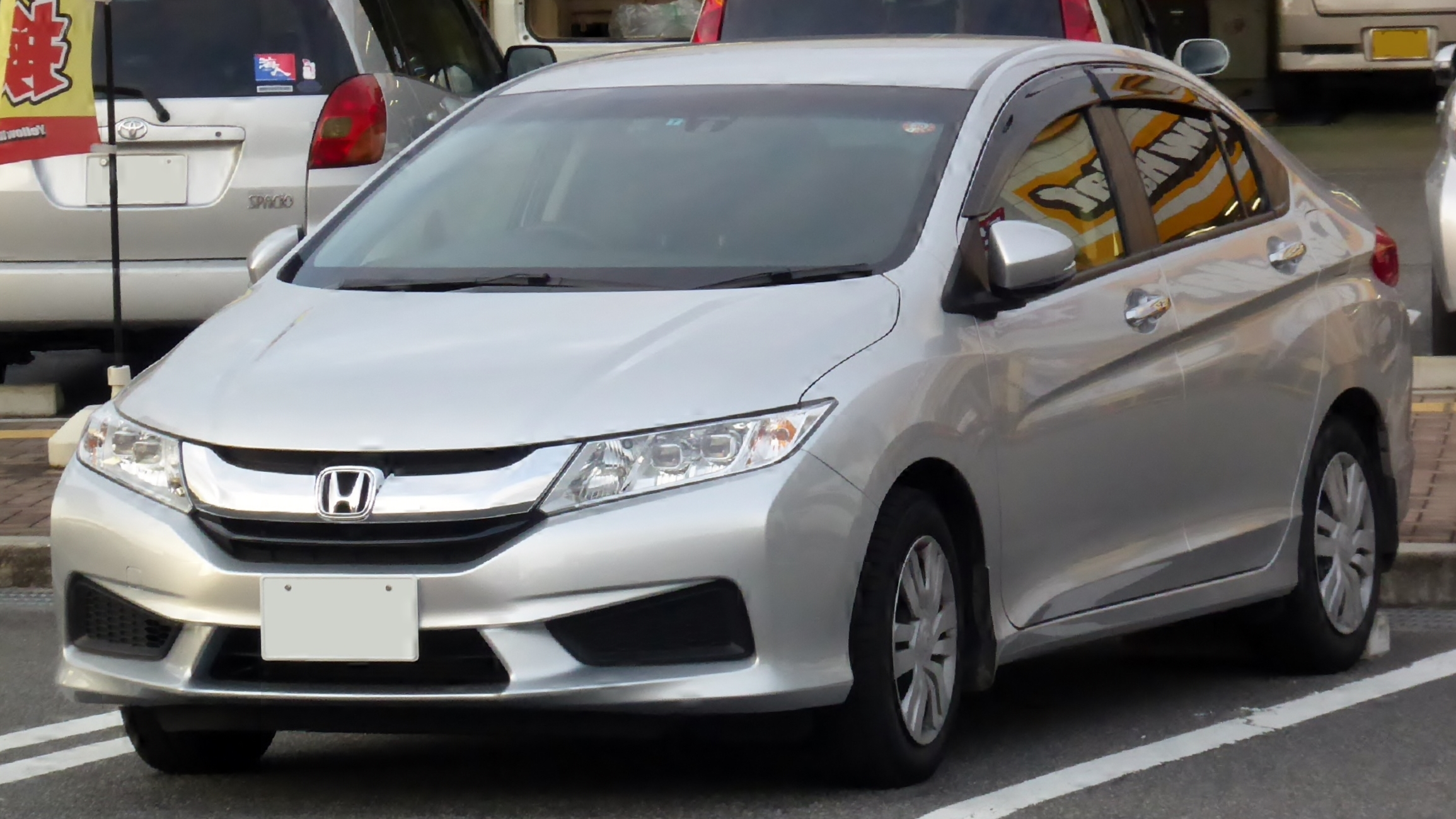
Honda Grace (Japan; pre-facelift)

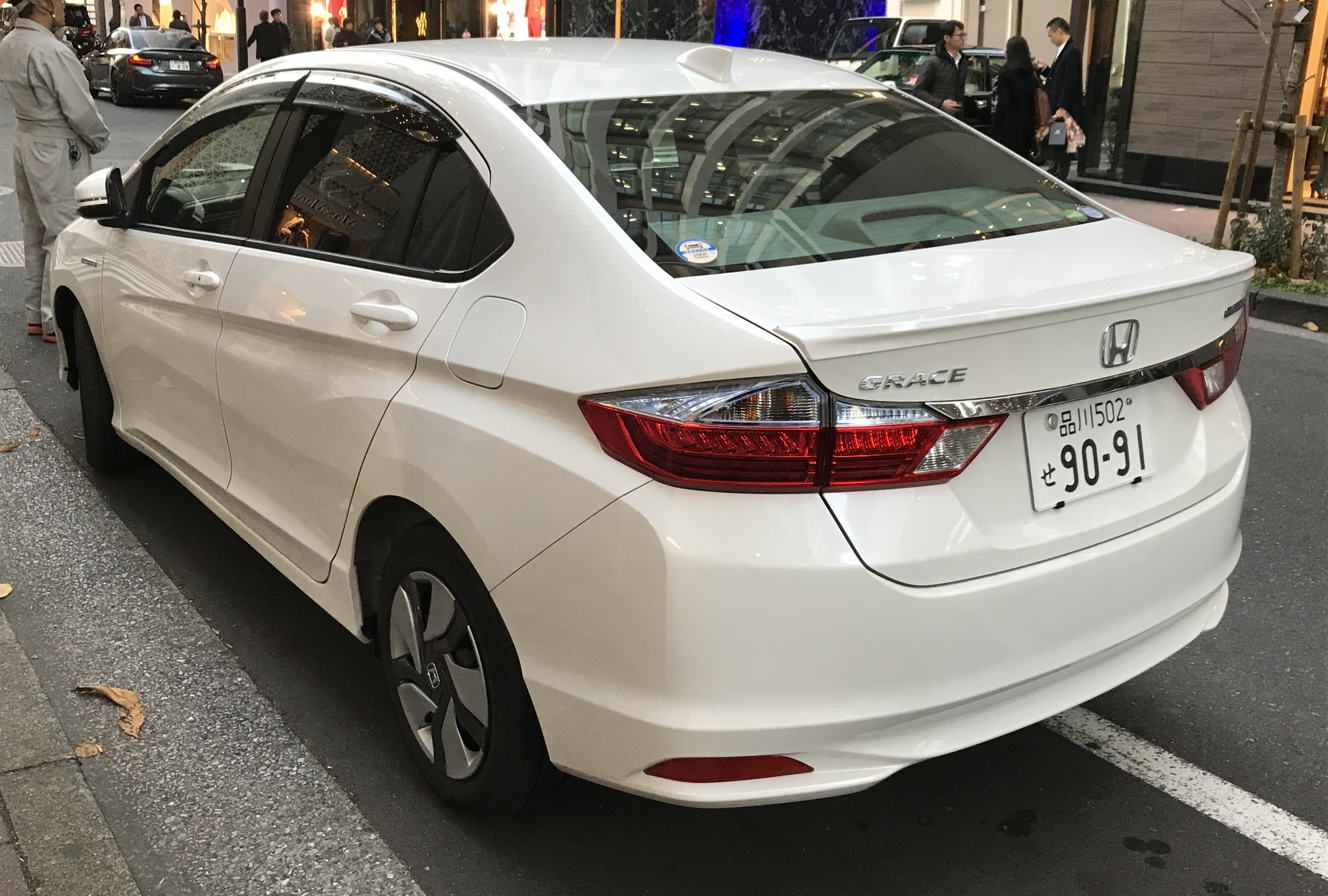
Honda Grace Hybrid (Japan; pre-facelift)

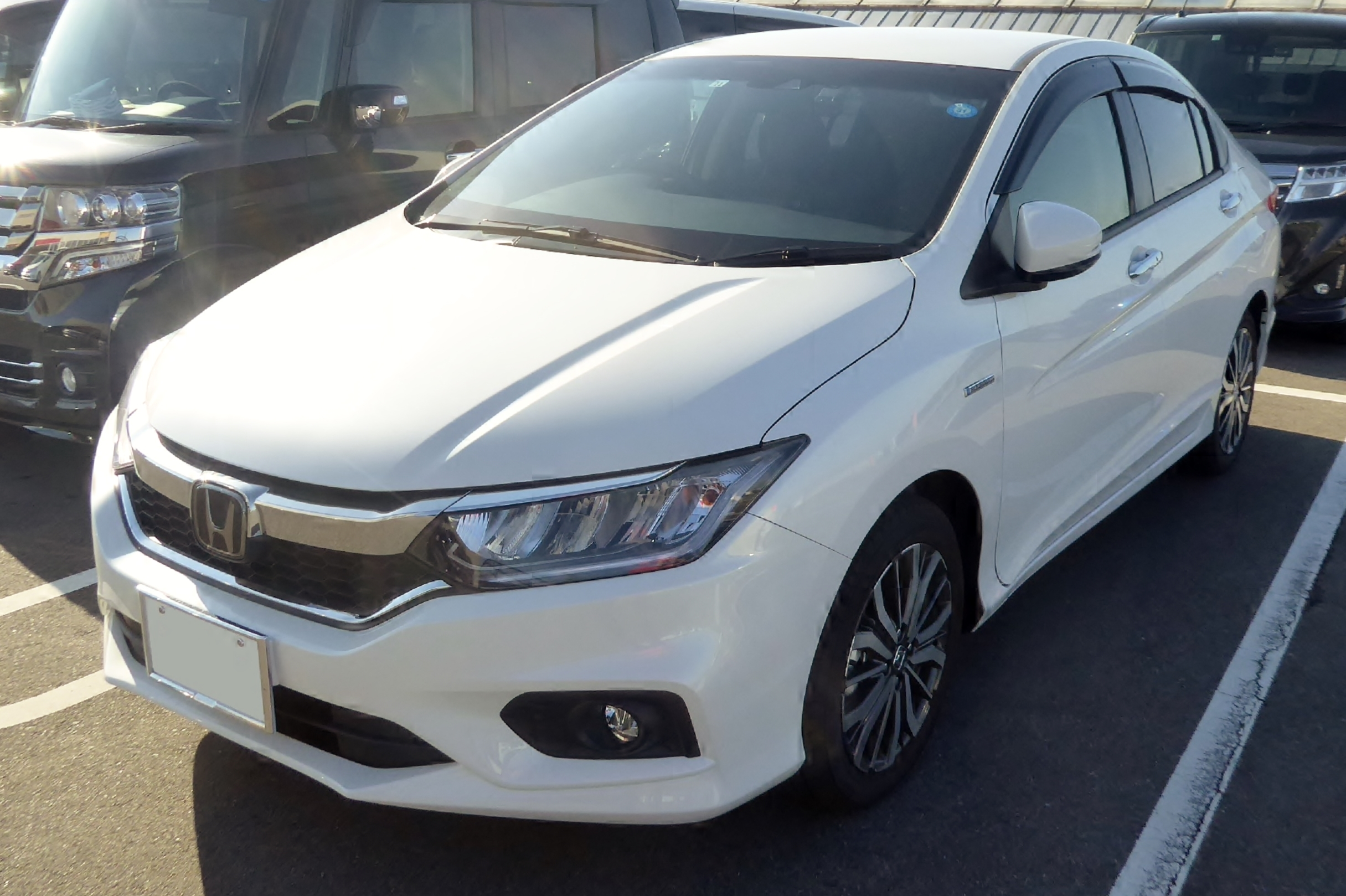
Honda Grace Hybrid (Japan; facelift)

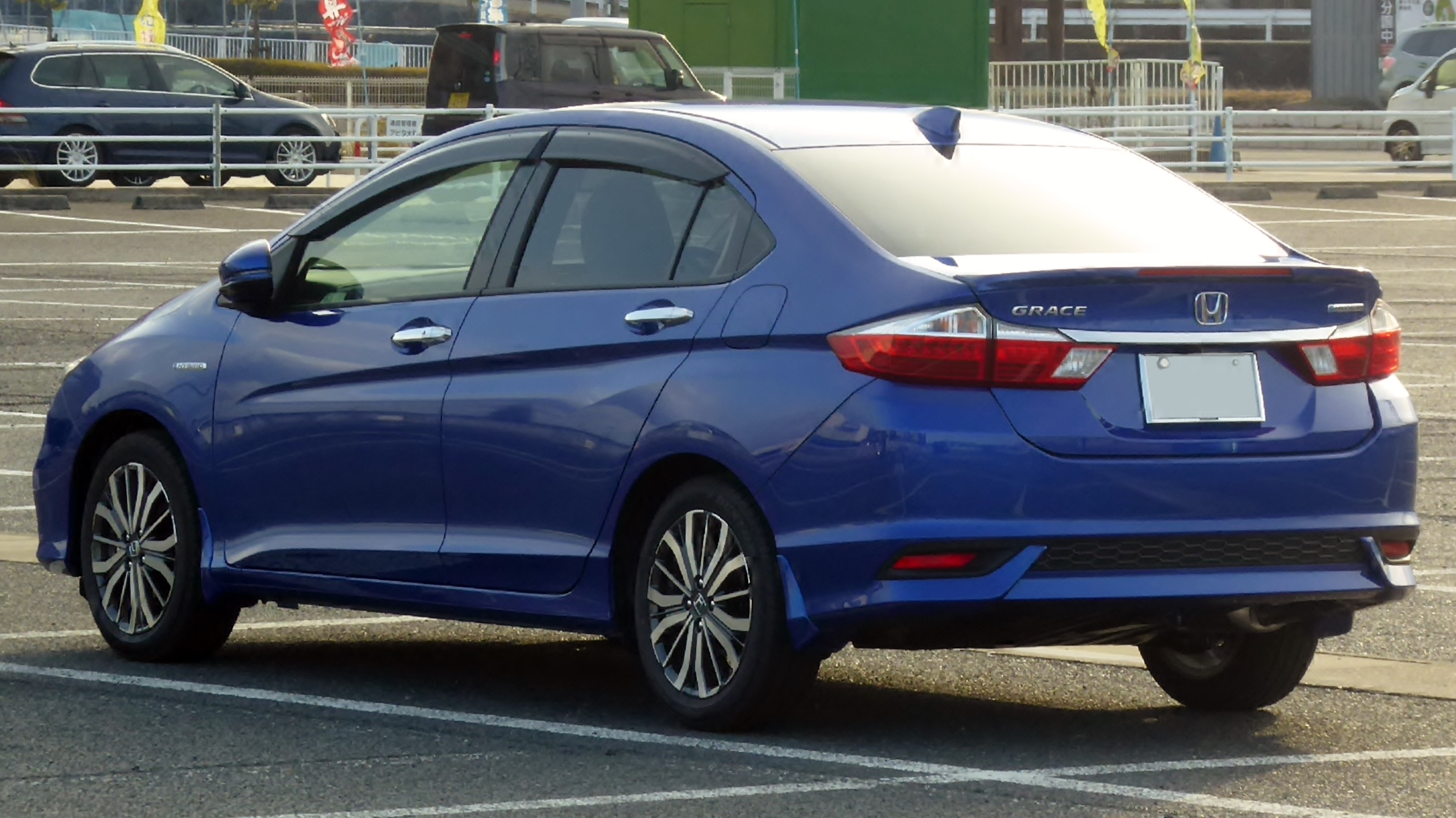
Honda Grace Hybrid (Japan; facelift)

==== Malaysia ====
In Malaysia, the sixth-generation City was launched on 20 March 2014 available in four trim levels (all powered by 1.5-litre engine with CVT) are offered: S, S+, E and V.

On 2 March 2017, the facelifted City was introduced with 3 trim levels available: S, E and V.

In July 2017, the S+ trim was discontinued to make way for the Hybrid version, with Malaysia being only the second country after Japan to have the City Hybrid on sale. The locally assembled hybrid uses Honda's intelligent-Dual Clutch Drive (i-DCD) Sport Hybrid system. It has an Atkinson cycle DOHC i-VTEC 1.5-litre engine with 110 PS (81 kW; 108 hp) and 134 N⋅m (99 lb⋅ft) of torque, mated to a 7-speed dual clutch transmission (DCT). Combined output is rated at 132 PS (97 kW; 130 hp) and 178 N⋅m (131 lb⋅ft) of torque.

The hybrid model was launched after an extensive two-year testing in Malaysia.

==== Philippines ====
In the Philippines, the sixth-generation City was launched on 22 April 2014 and is available in 3 trim levels. E, VX and VX+

In May 2017, a facelifted version of the City debuted in the Philippines with added LED headlights and fog lights for the VX+ and daytime running lights (DRLs) standard across the line.

==== Singapore ====
The City is available from Kah Motor (Honda's Singapore distributor) in 2 trim levels: V and SV. In 2018, with the facelifted City, the SV trim was further differentiated from the basic V trim with automatic climate controls, an aftermarket touchscreen head unit instead of a factory fitted one and boot spoiler, along with features previously offered prior to the facelift such as paddle shifters, push start, fog lamps and 16” rims.

It is also available as the Honda Grace through parallel import dealerships, in both petrol and hybrid versions, in basic DX and high spec LX trims.

==== Taiwan ====
Honda Taiwan first displayed the sixth-generation City at the 2014 Taipei Auto Show in which Honda also exhibited its NSX concept sports car. The Taiwanese market City was formally announced on 4 March 2014 and went on sale in the second quarter of the same year. This was the first time the City had been on sale in Taiwan since 2002, when the third-generation City ceased production. The model had ceased production in November 2020.

==== Thailand ====
The sixth-generation City received its ASEAN debut in Thailand on 23 January 2014. The 1.5-litre i-VTEC petrol engine, the only engine option for Thailand, has been tuned to comply with E85 fuel. The sixth-generation City is sold in six trim levels (S MT, S CVT, V CVT, V+ CVT, SV CVT and SV+ CVT). Certain Thai market variants are available with 2 airbags, Vehicle Stability Assist (VSA) and Hill Start Assist. 6 airbags is only available in top option SV+ trim (SV Plus).

==== Vietnam ====
The City, together with Honda CR-V, were Honda's top sellers in the country in 2014.

==== Pakistan ====
The sixth-generation City was launched in Pakistan in July 2021, replacing the long-running fifth-generation City. Assembled locally, it was launched with two engine option, which are 1.2-litre and 1.5-litre petrol engines.

=== Safety ===
==== Global NCAP ====
Global NCAP 1.0 test results (India) Honda City (4th Gen) – 2 Airbags (H1 2022, similar to Latin NCAP 2013)
Test	Score	Stars
Adult occupant protection	12.03/17.00	4 /5 stars
Child occupant protection	38.27/49.00	4 /5 stars

==== Latin NCAP ====
Latin NCAP 1.5 test results 2015 Honda City sedan, LHD (2 airbags) (2015, similar to Euro NCAP 2002)
Test	Points	Stars
Adult occupant:	16.07/17.0	5 /5 stars
Child occupant:	41.81/49.00	4 /5 stars

==== ASEAN NCAP ====
ASEAN NCAP test results Honda City (2014)
Test	Points	Stars
Adult occupant:	15.80	4 /5 stars
Child occupant:	83%	4 /5 stars
Safety assist:	NA	

ASEAN NCAP test results Honda City (2014)
Test	Points	Stars
Adult occupant:	15.80	5 /5 stars
Child occupant:	83%	4 /5 stars
Safety assist:	NA	

==== Australia ====
ANCAP test results* Honda City (2014)
Test	Score
Overall	5 /5 stars
Frontal offset	14.62/16
Side impact	16/16
Pole	2/2
Seat belt reminders	3/3
Whiplash protection	Good
Pedestrian protection	Adequate
Electronic stability control	Standard

== Seventh generation (GN; 2019) ==
Seventh generation
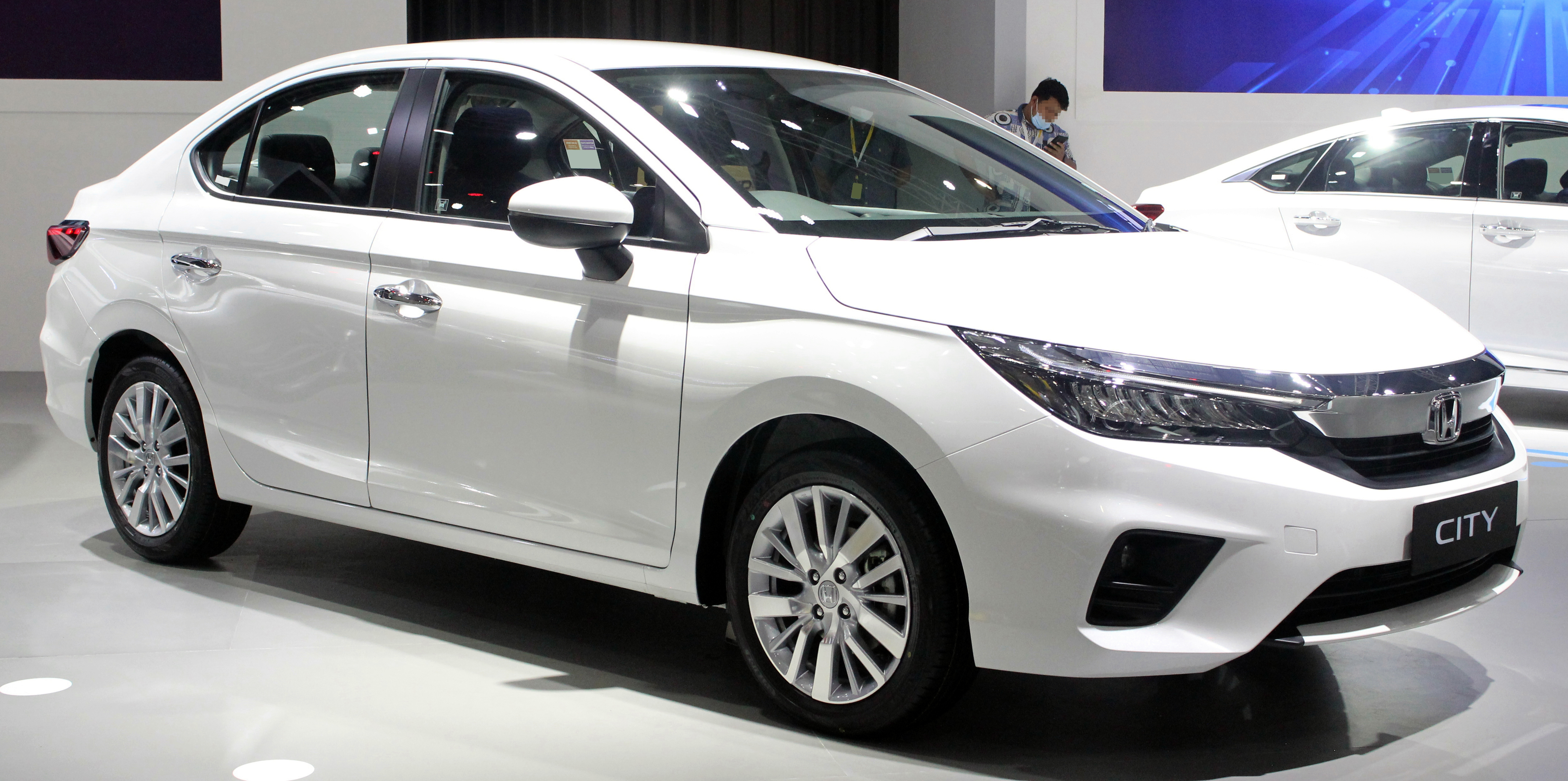
- 2022 Honda City (pre-facelift)

Overview
- Model code: GN1; GN2; GN3; GN5; GN6; GN7
- Also called: Honda Ballade (South Africa, sedan, until 2025)
- Production: 2019–present
- Assembly: Thailand: Ayutthaya; Prachinburi; India: Tapukara (HCIL); Malaysia: Alor Gajah, Malacca; Vietnam: Vĩnh Phúc (Honda Ô tô Vĩnh Phúc); Indonesia: Karawang, West Java (HPM, until 2025); Brazil: Sumaré, São Paulo
- Designer: Norihito Ōnuma; Taishi Ogawa (hatchback)

Body and chassis
- Body style: 4-door sedan; 5-door hatchback
- Layout: Front-engine, front-wheel-drive
- Platform: Honda Global Small Car
- Related: Honda Elevate/WR-V; Honda Fit/Jazz/Life (fourth generation); Honda HR-V/Vezel (third generation)

Powertrain
- Engine: Petrol: 1.0 L P10A6 I3 turbo (Thailand); 1.5 L L15Z1C I4; 1.5 L L15ZF I4; Petrol hybrid: 1.5 L LEB8 Atkinson cycle i-MMD I4; 1.5 L LEB-H5 Atkinson cycle i-MMD I4; Diesel: 1.5 L N15 I4 turbo (India)
- Electric motor: 79 kW (107 PS; 106 hp) AC PMSM
- Transmission: 6-speed manual; CVT; eCVT (hybrid)
- Hybrid drivetrain: Sport Hybrid i-MMD (City e:HEV)

Dimensions
- Wheelbase: 2,589–2,600 mm (101.9–102.4 in)
- Length: 4,553 mm (179.3 in) (sedan); 4,345 mm (171.1 in) (hatchback)
- Width: 1,748 mm (68.8 in)
- Height: 1,467–1,489 mm (57.8–58.6 in)
- Curb weight: 1,065–1,217 kg (2,348–2,683 lb)

Chronology
- Predecessor: Honda Fit/Jazz (third generation) (hatchback, Southeast Asia and South America)

The seventh-generation City (fifth-generation as a sedan) was unveiled in Bangkok, Thailand, on 25 November 2019 in its sedan form. It shared its platform with the fourth-generation Fit/Jazz. While its dimensions have grown to the point that it is slightly larger than the ninth-generation Civic sedan (2011–2016), the City continues to be marketed and priced as a subcompact or B-segment car.

=== Sedan ===
==== Pre-facelift ====
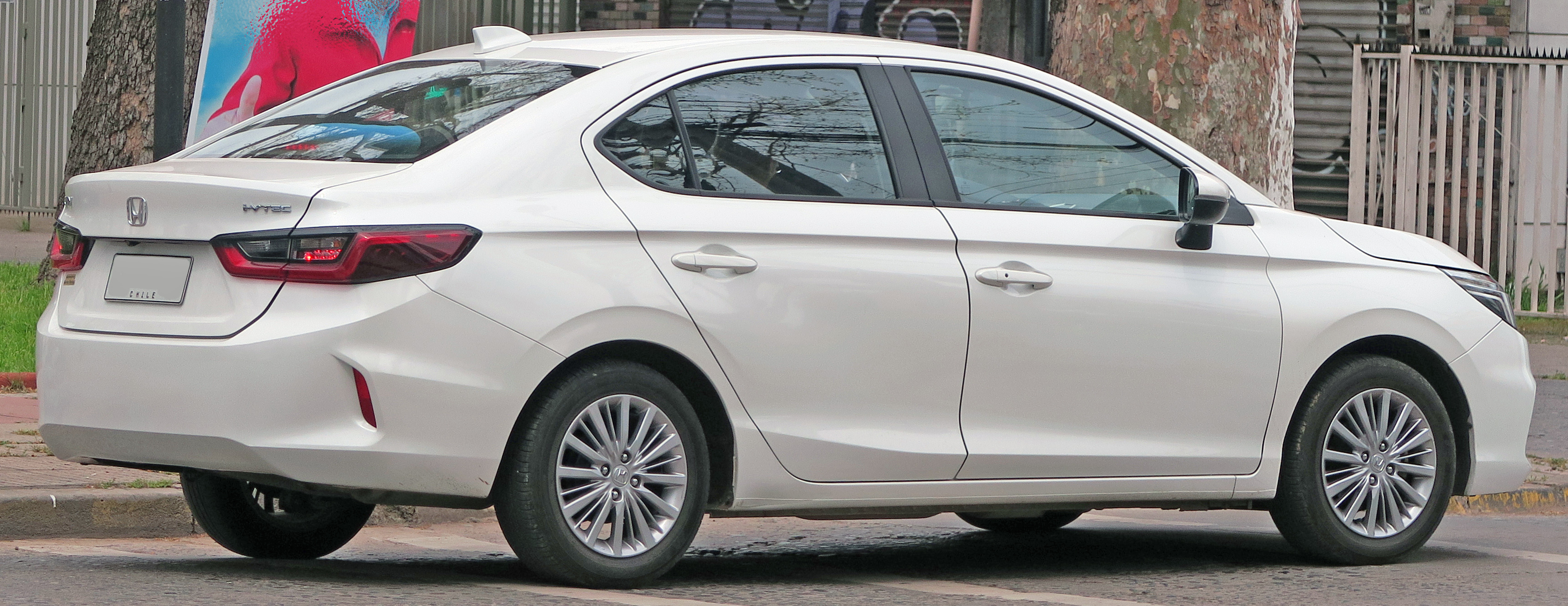
Rear view (sedan, pre-facelift)

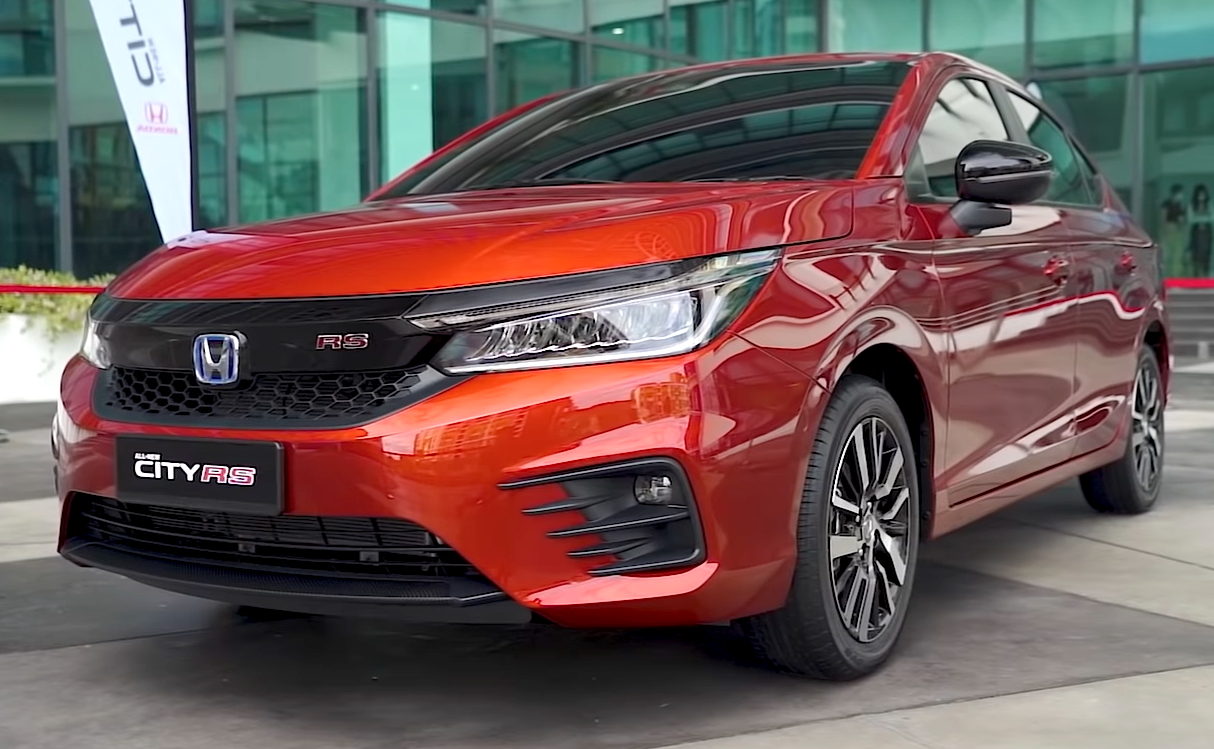
RS e:HEV sedan (pre-facelift)

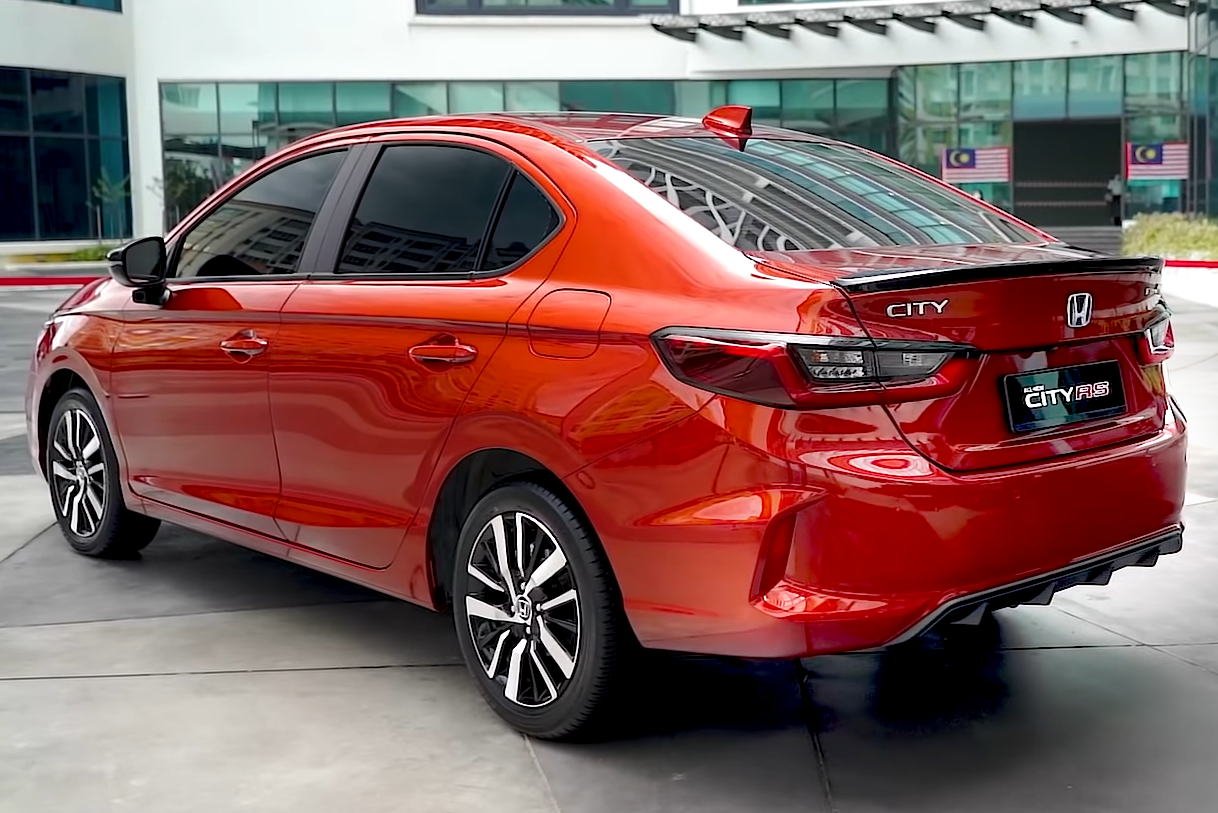
RS e:HEV Rear view (sedan, pre-facelift)

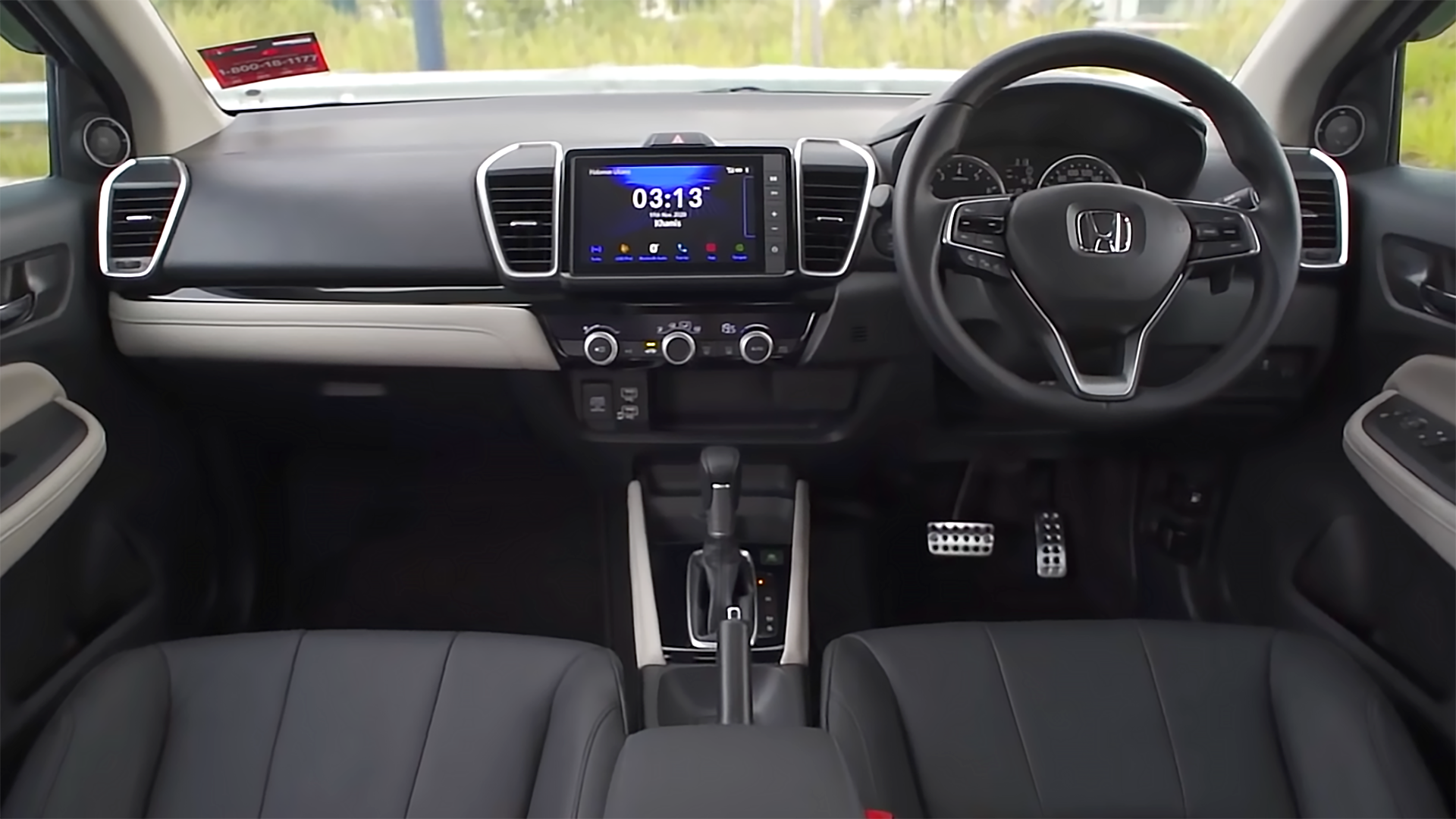
Interior (pre-facelift)

==== First facelift ====
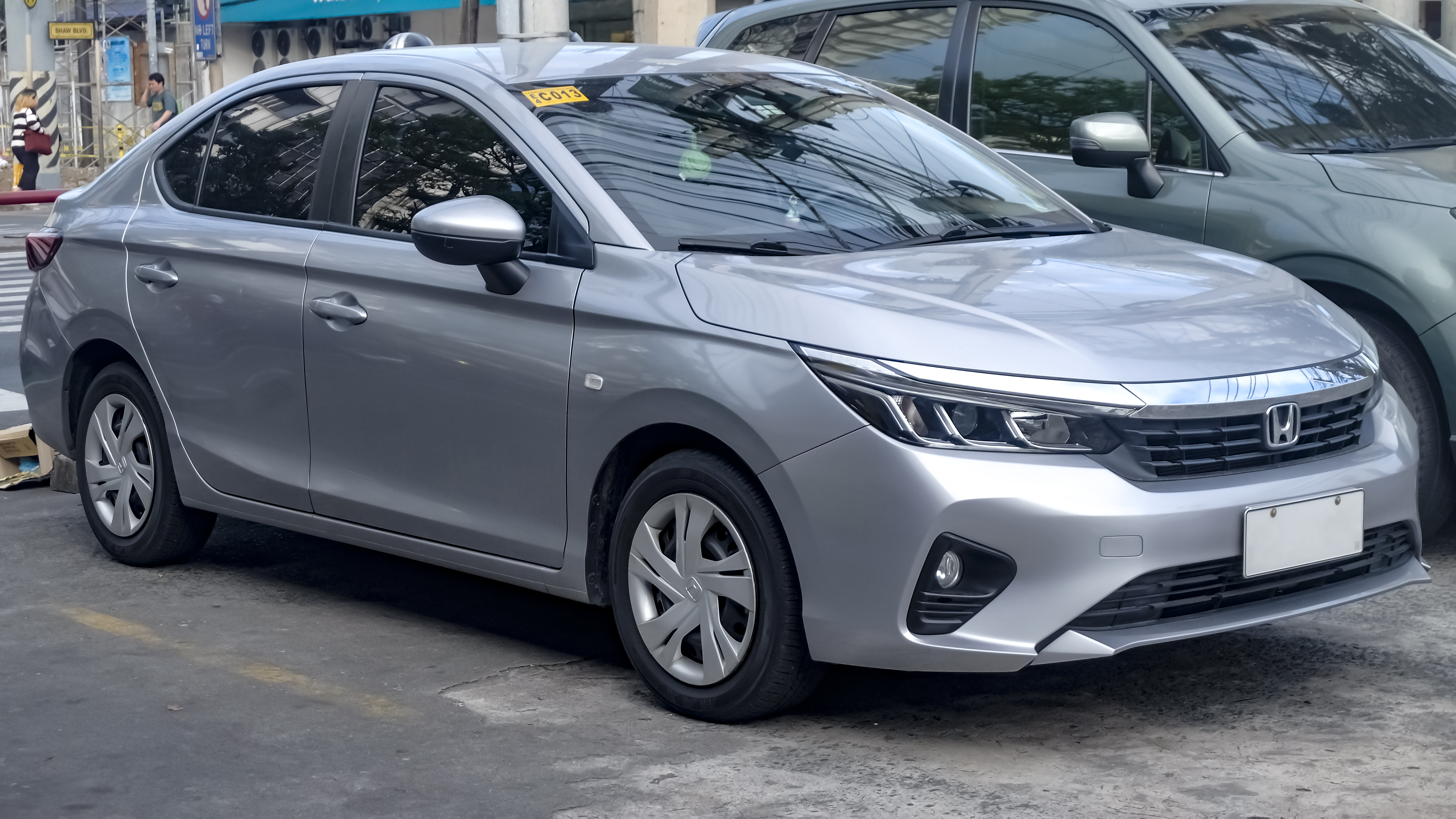
City sedan (first facelift)

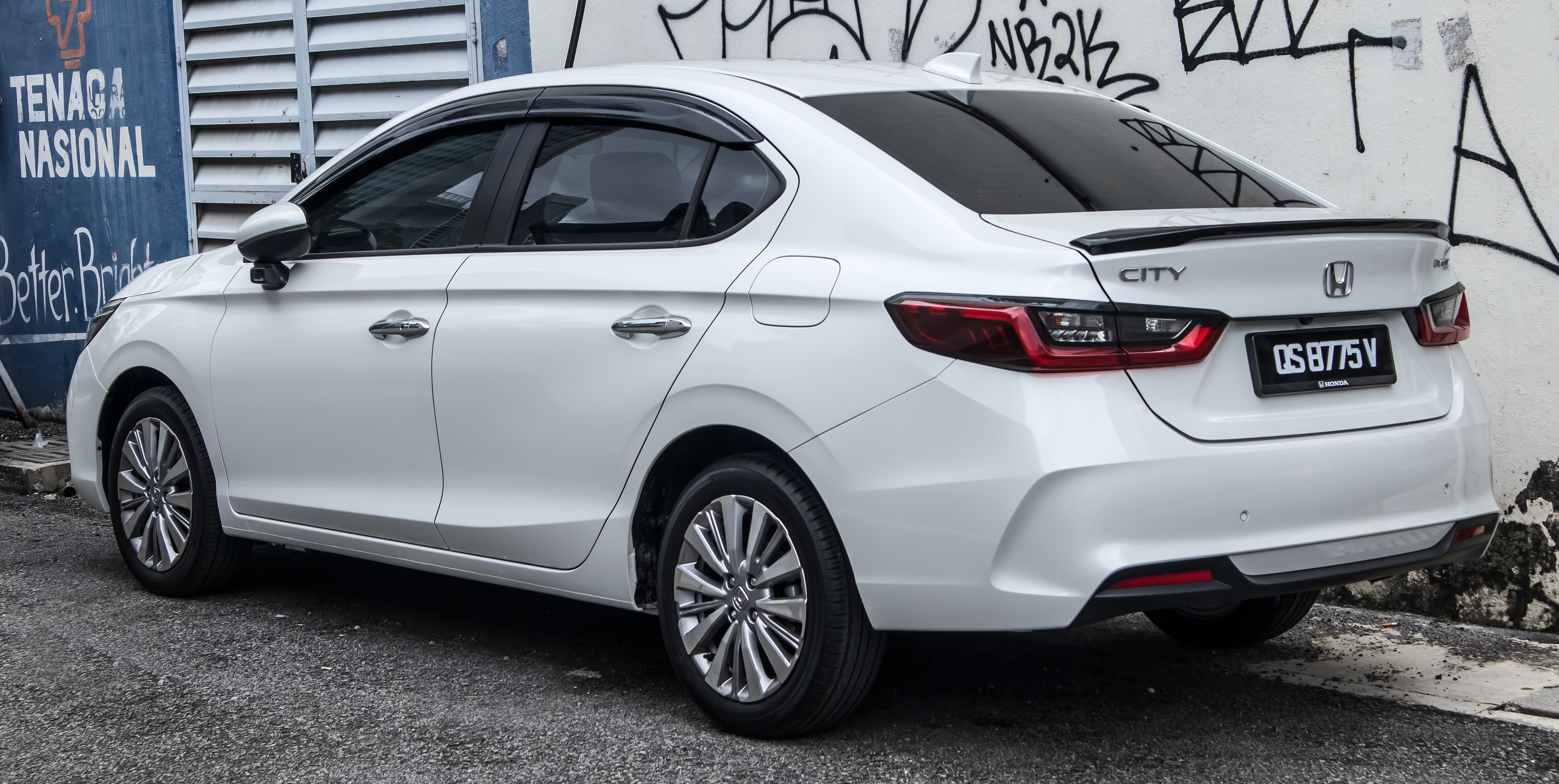
Rear view (sedan, first facelift)

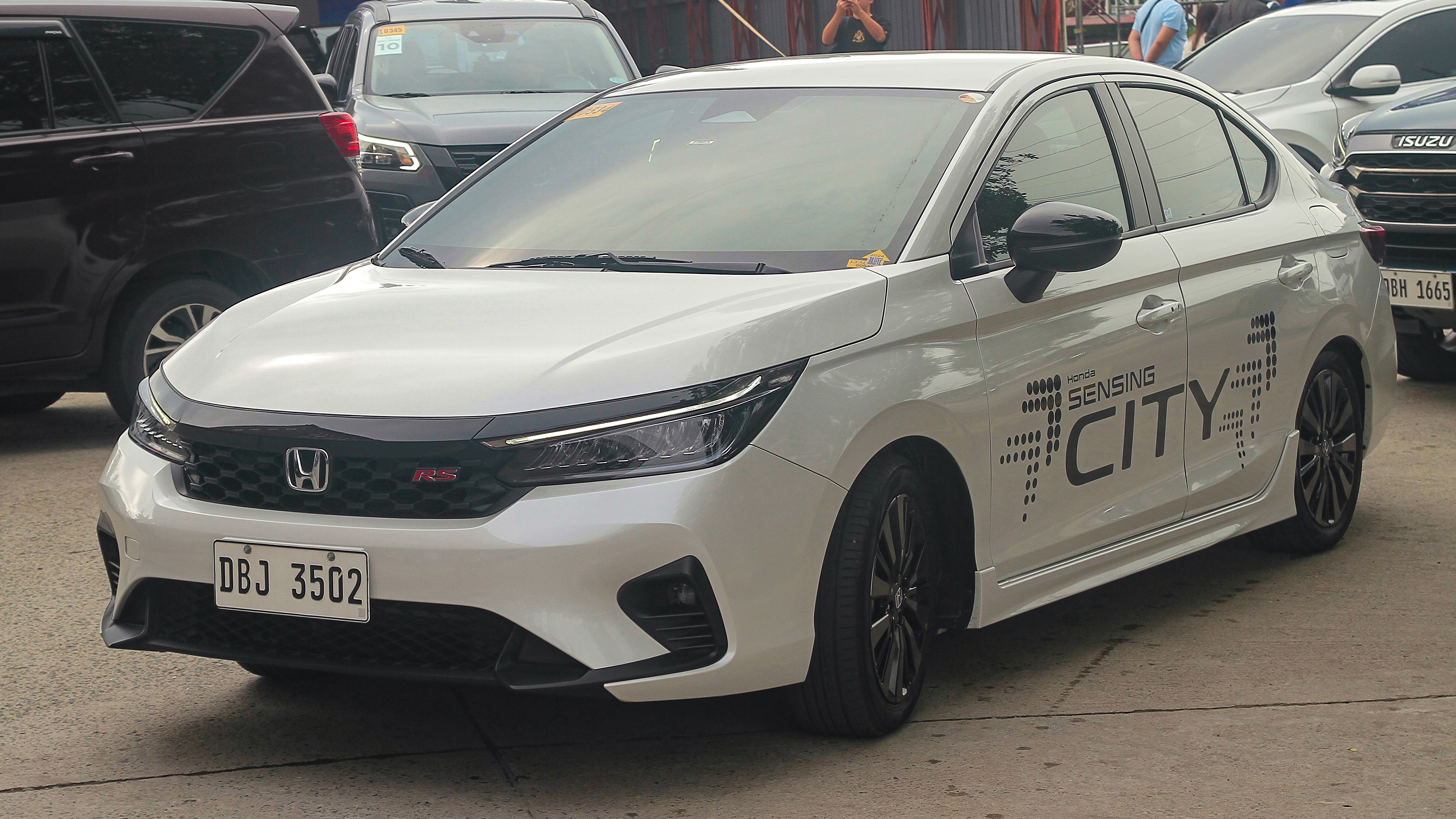
City RS sedan (first facelift)

==== Second facelift ====
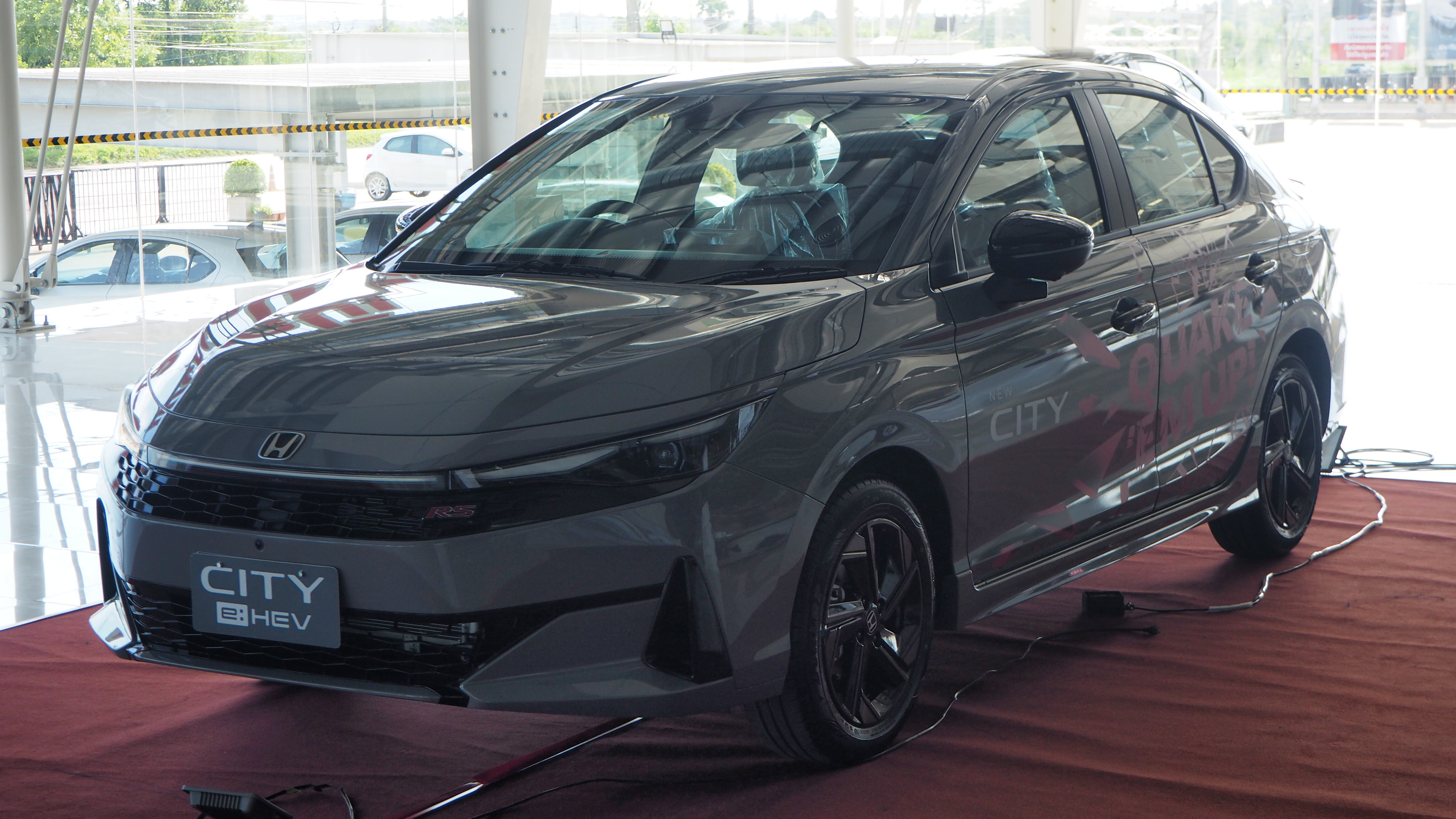
RS e:HEV sedan (second facelift)

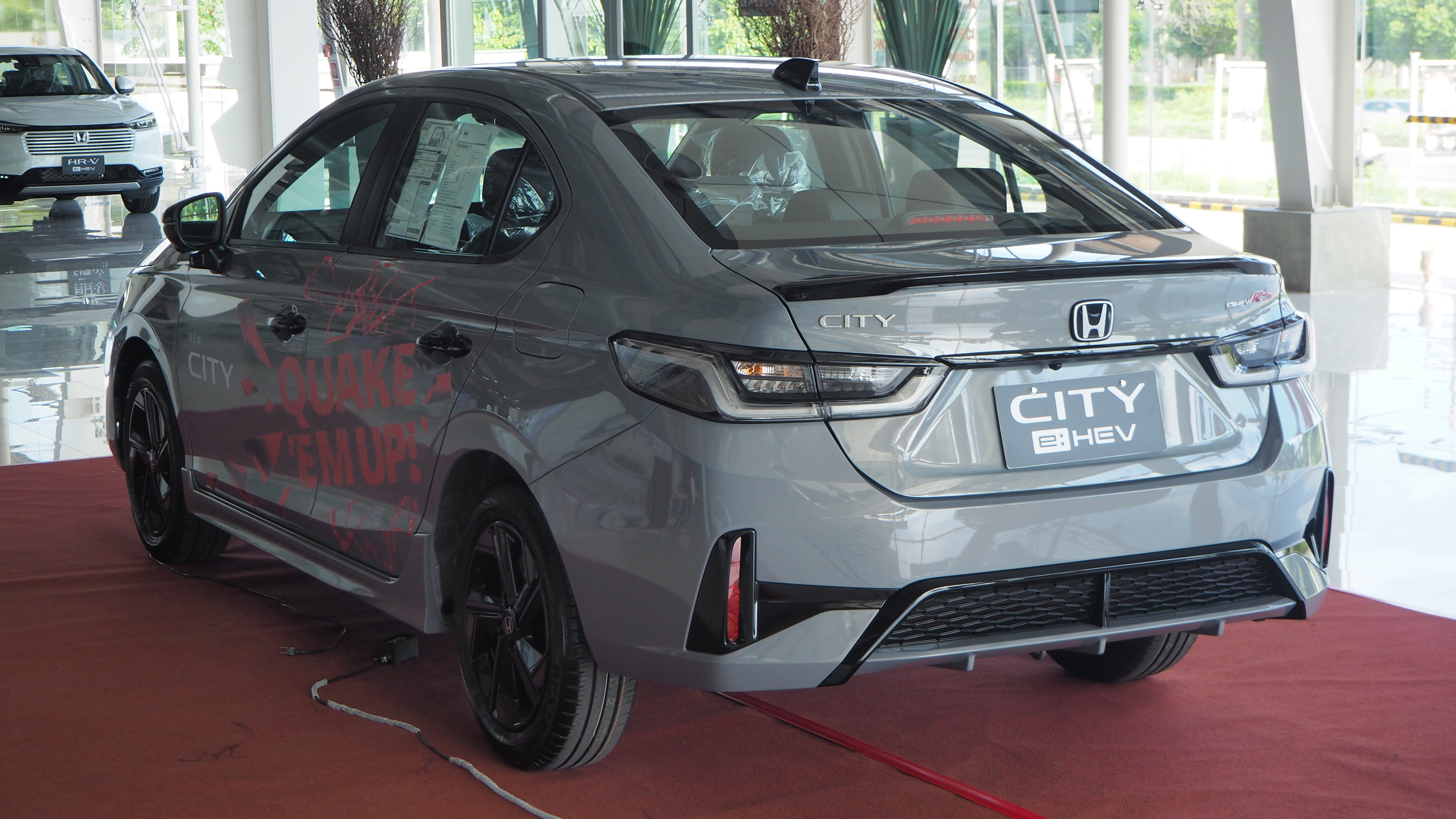
RS e:HEV Rear view (sedan, second facelift)

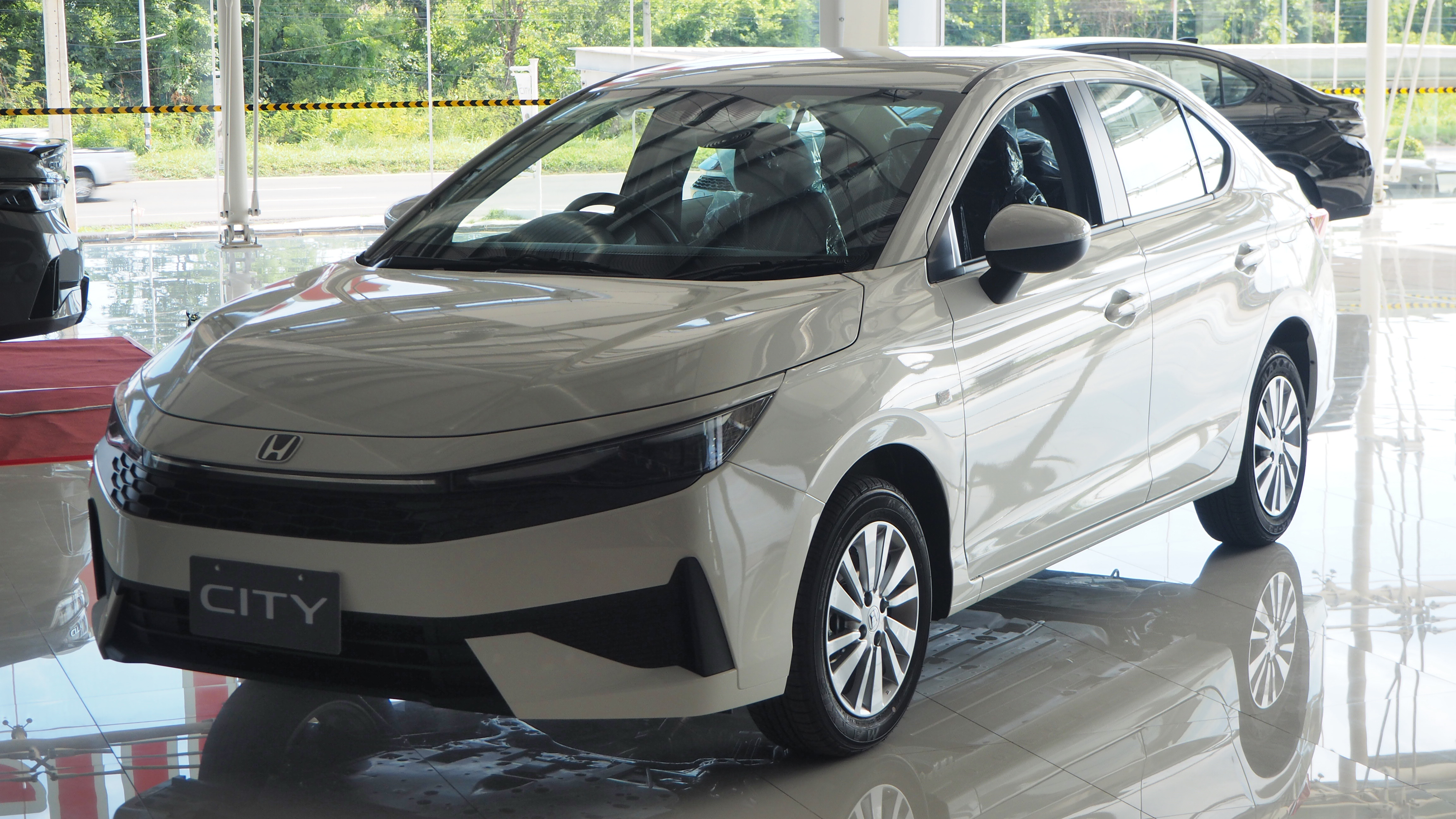
S sedan (second facelift)

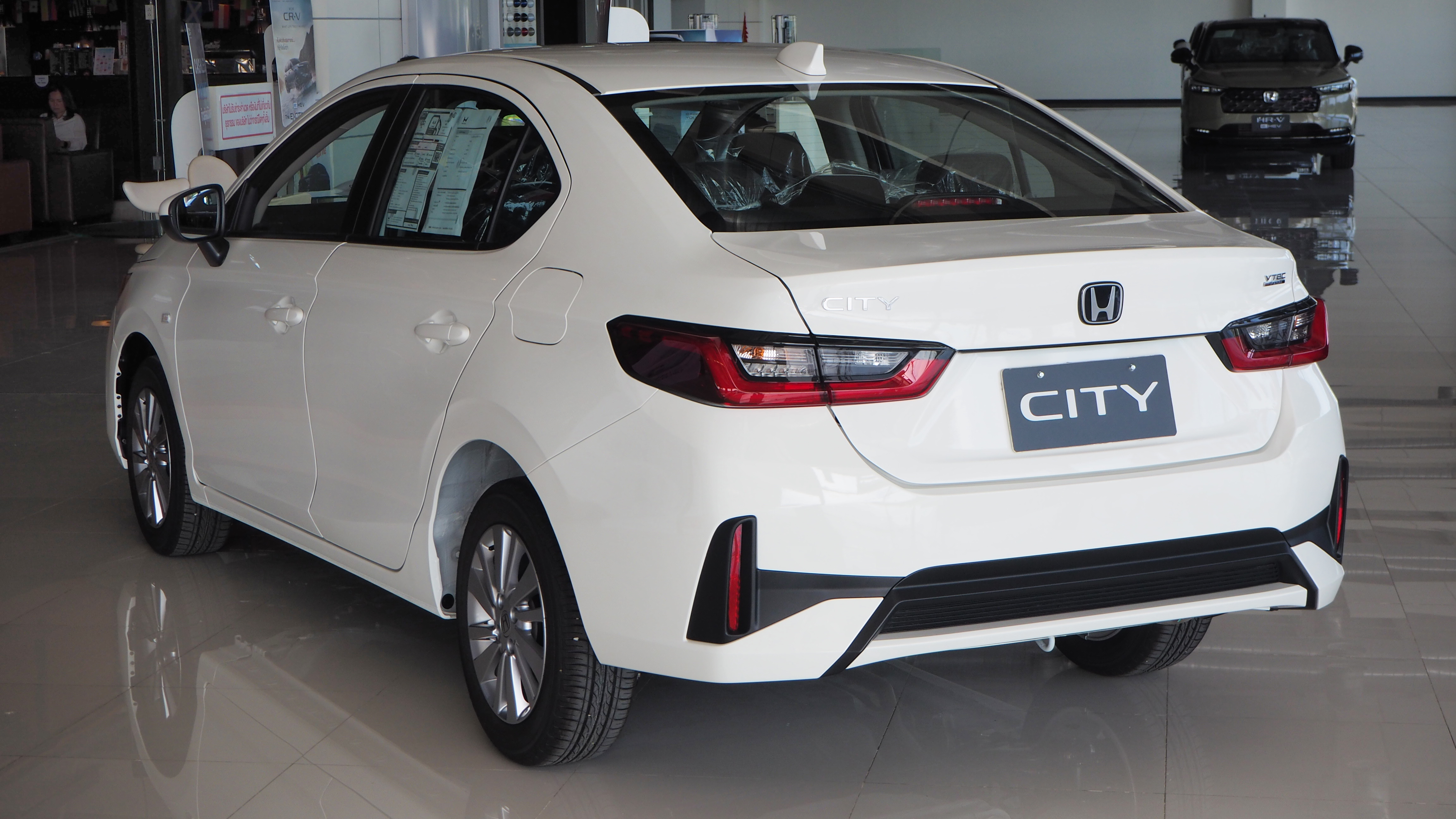
S rear view (sedan, second facelift)

=== Hatchback ===
The hatchback version was launched in November 2020; 26 years after the body style was last used in 1994. Dimensions-wise, the hatchback is 208 mm (8.2 in) shorter than the sedan at 4,345 mm (171.1 in), which means it is close in size compared to the European ninth-generation Civic hatchback. Honda claimed hatchback offers more legroom than the sedan and offers the Ultra Seats carried from the Fit/Jazz and HR-V, allowing for four rear seat arrangements – utility, long, tall and refresh modes. The City Hatchback serves as a replacement to the Fit/Jazz in several emerging markets (except in South Africa, Singapore and Brunei where the Fit/Jazz is sold), and has been produced in Thailand, Indonesia, Malaysia, and Brazil.

The first-facelifted City hatchback was revealed on 8 February 2024.

==== Pre-facelift ====
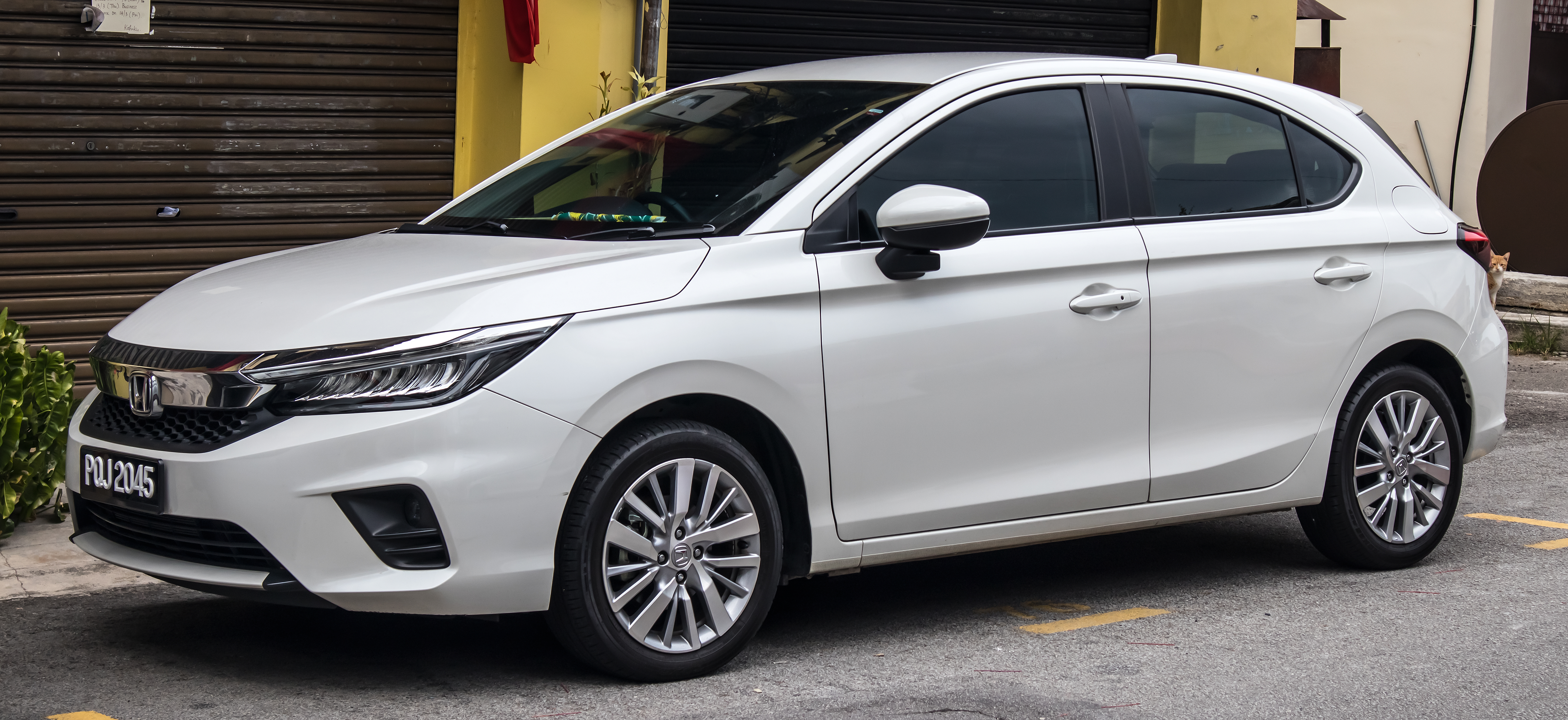
City Hatchback (pre-facelift)

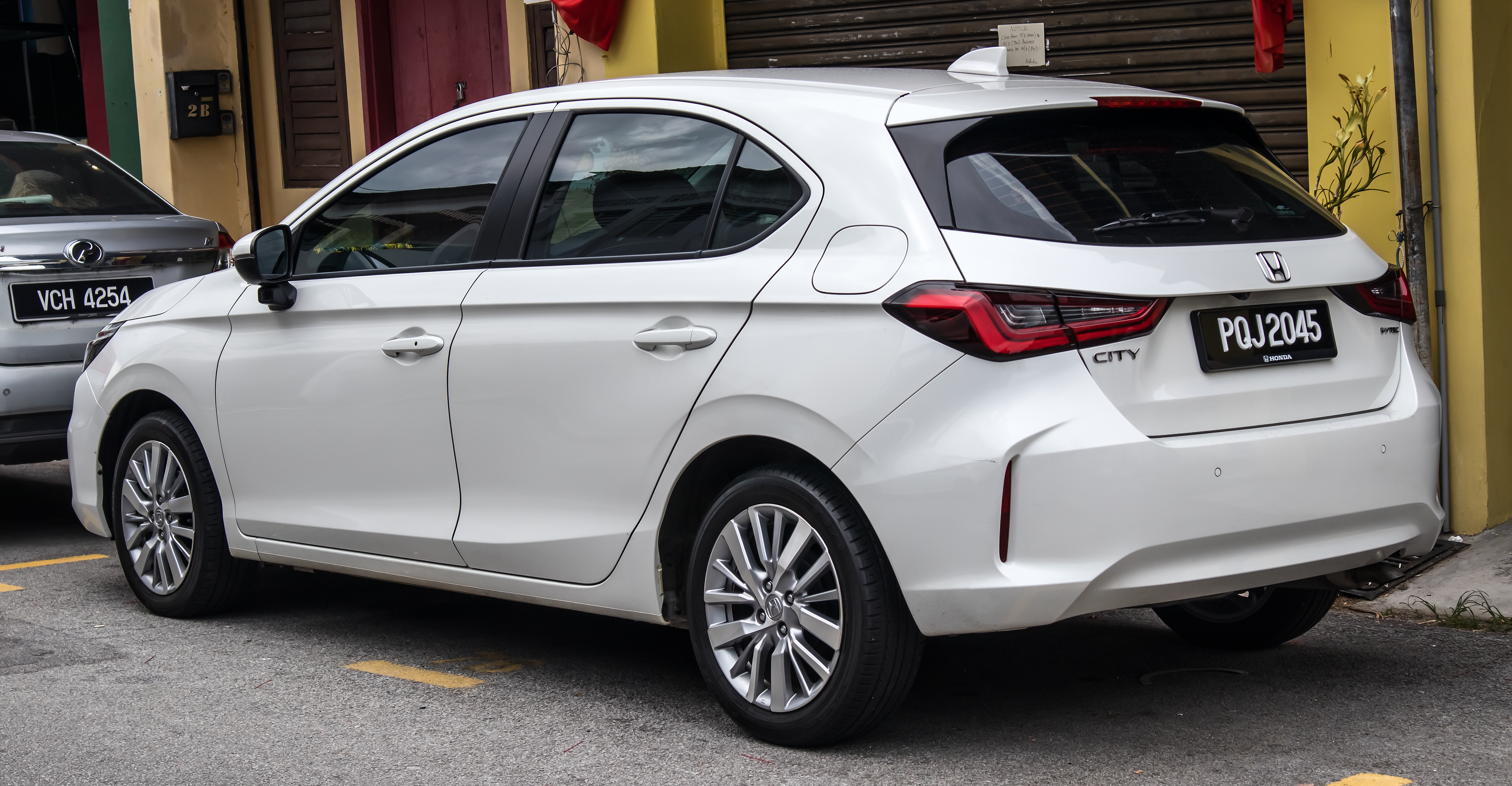
Rear view (pre-facelift)

==== First facelift ====
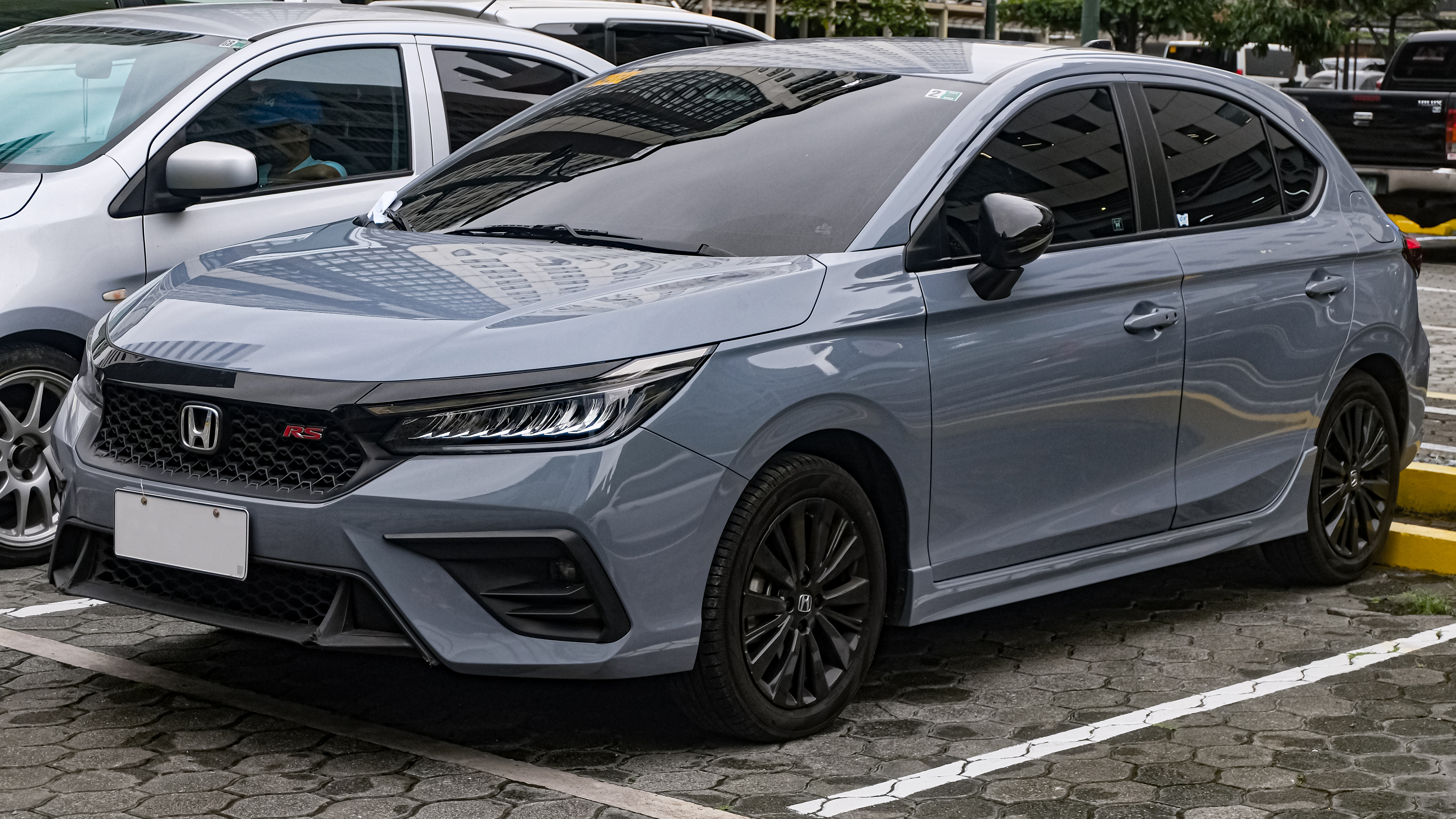
City Hatchback RS (first facelift)

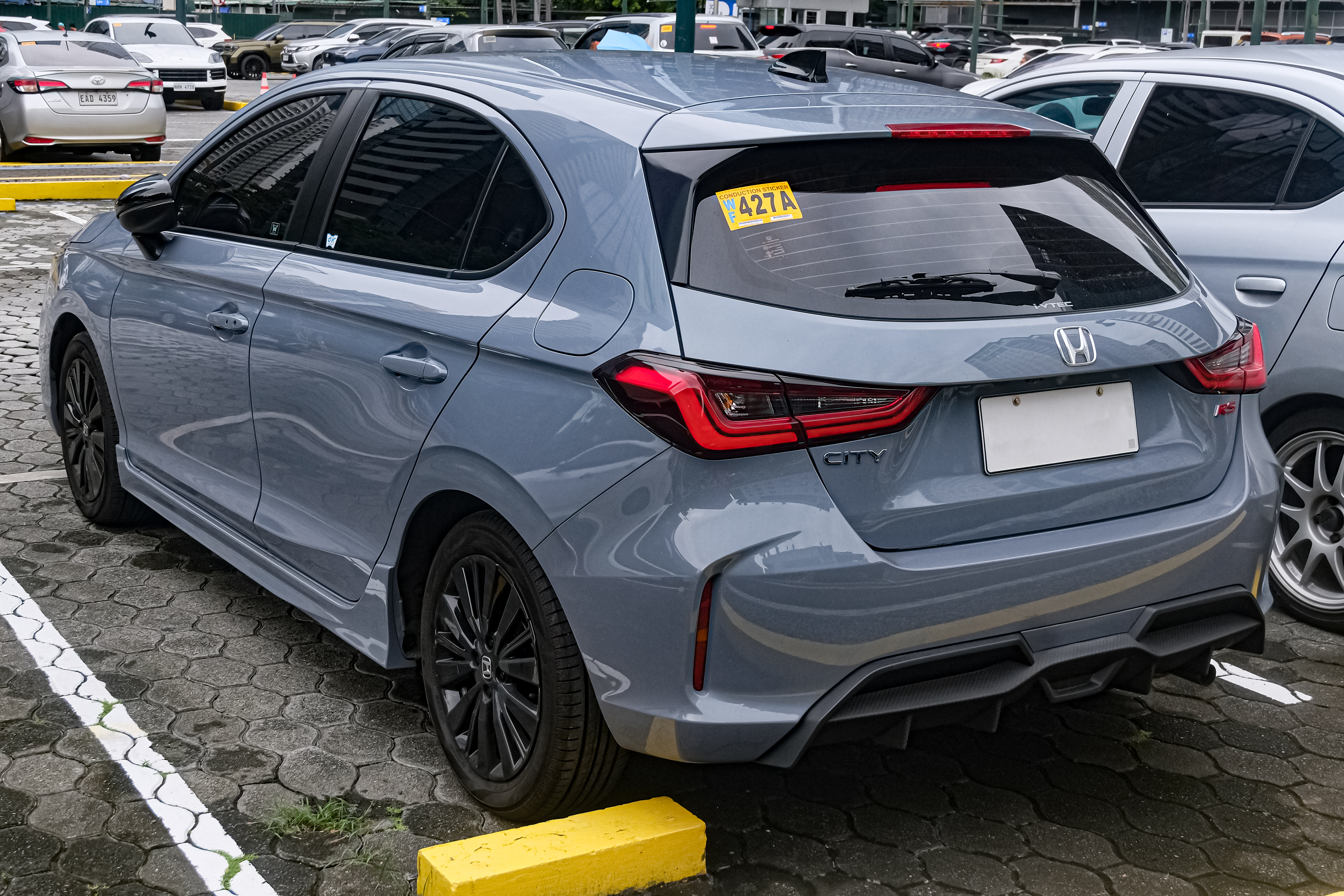
Rear view (first facelift)

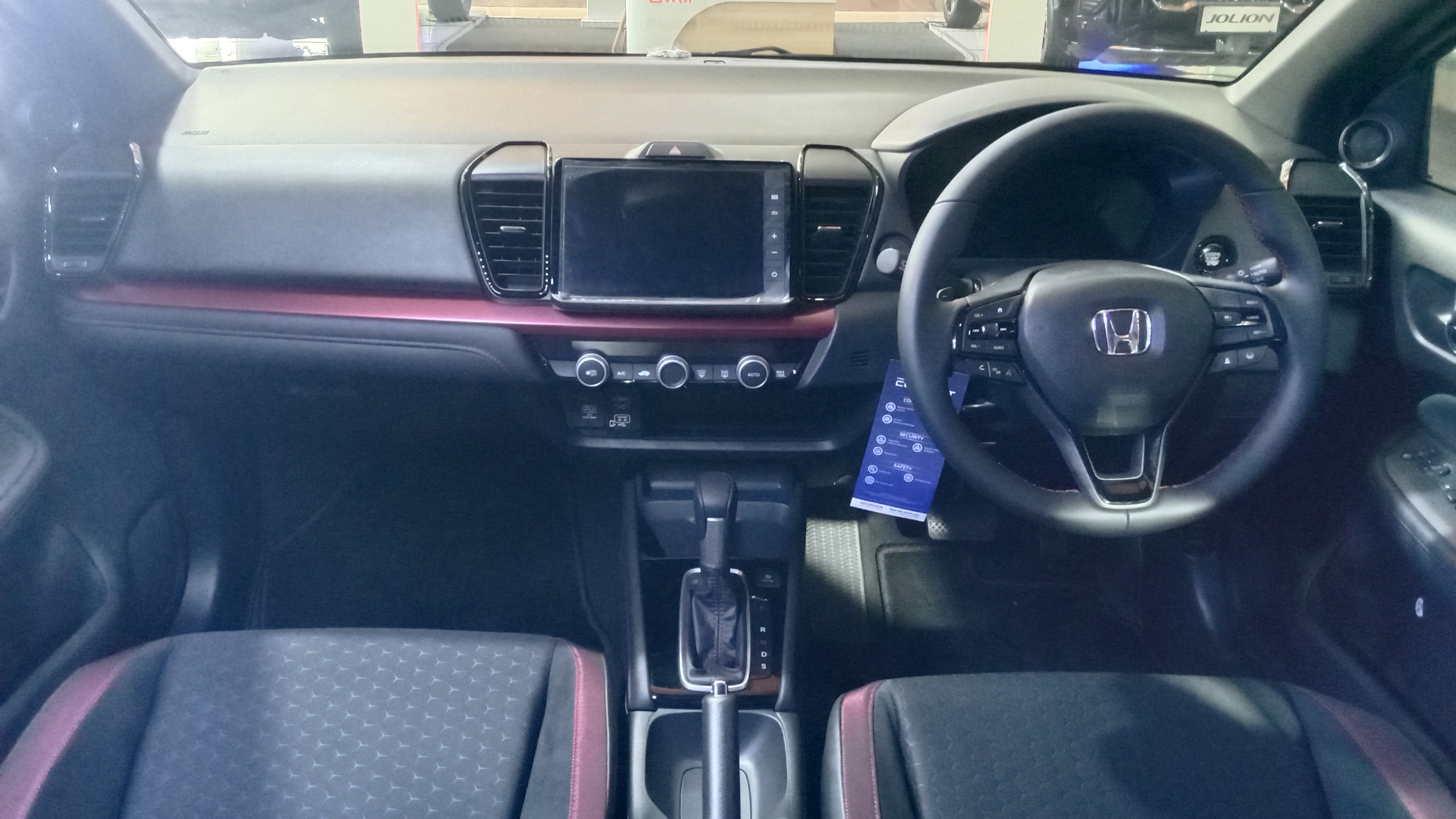
Interior (first facelift)

==== Second facelift ====
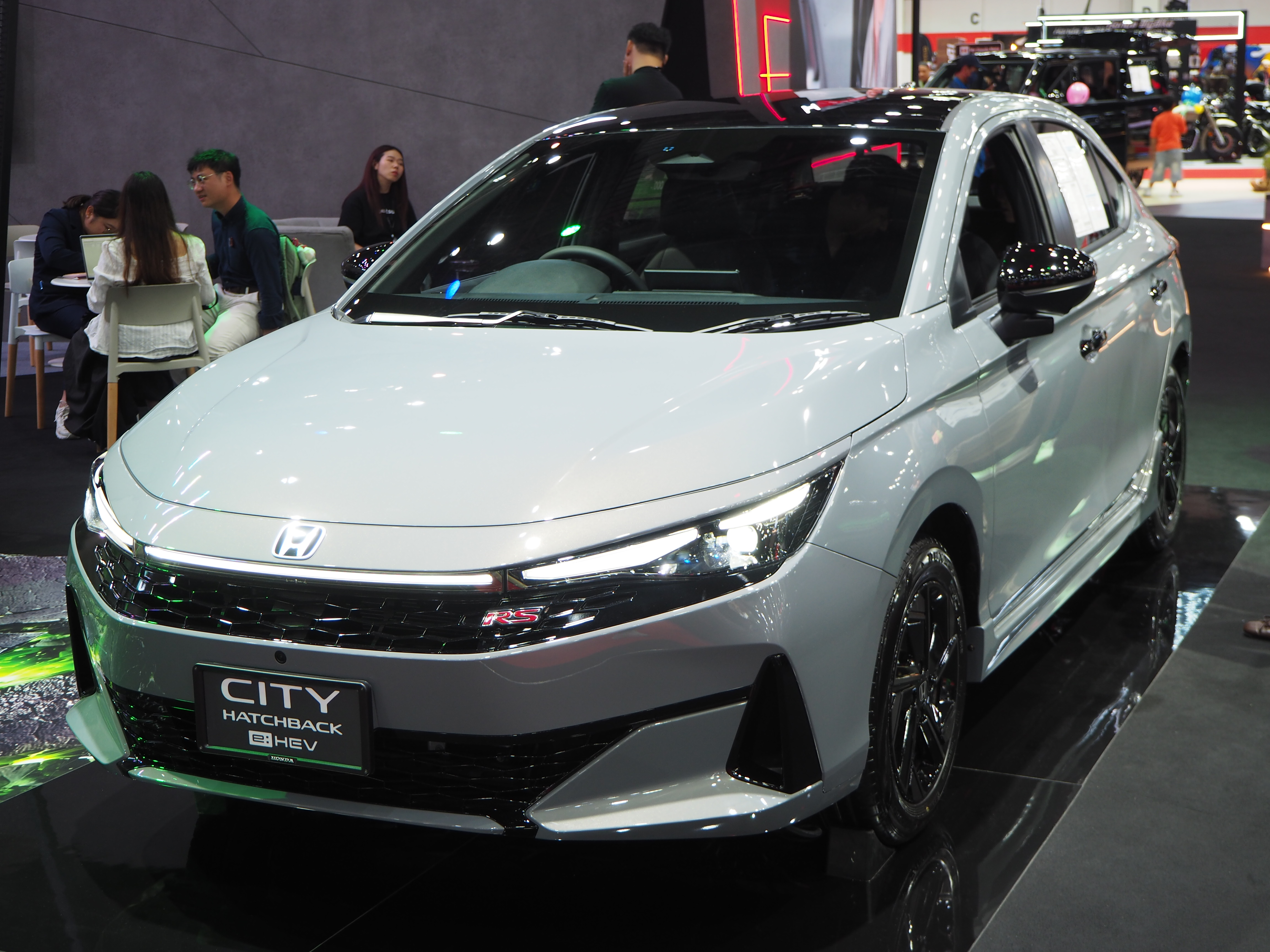
RS e:HEV Hatchback (second facelift)

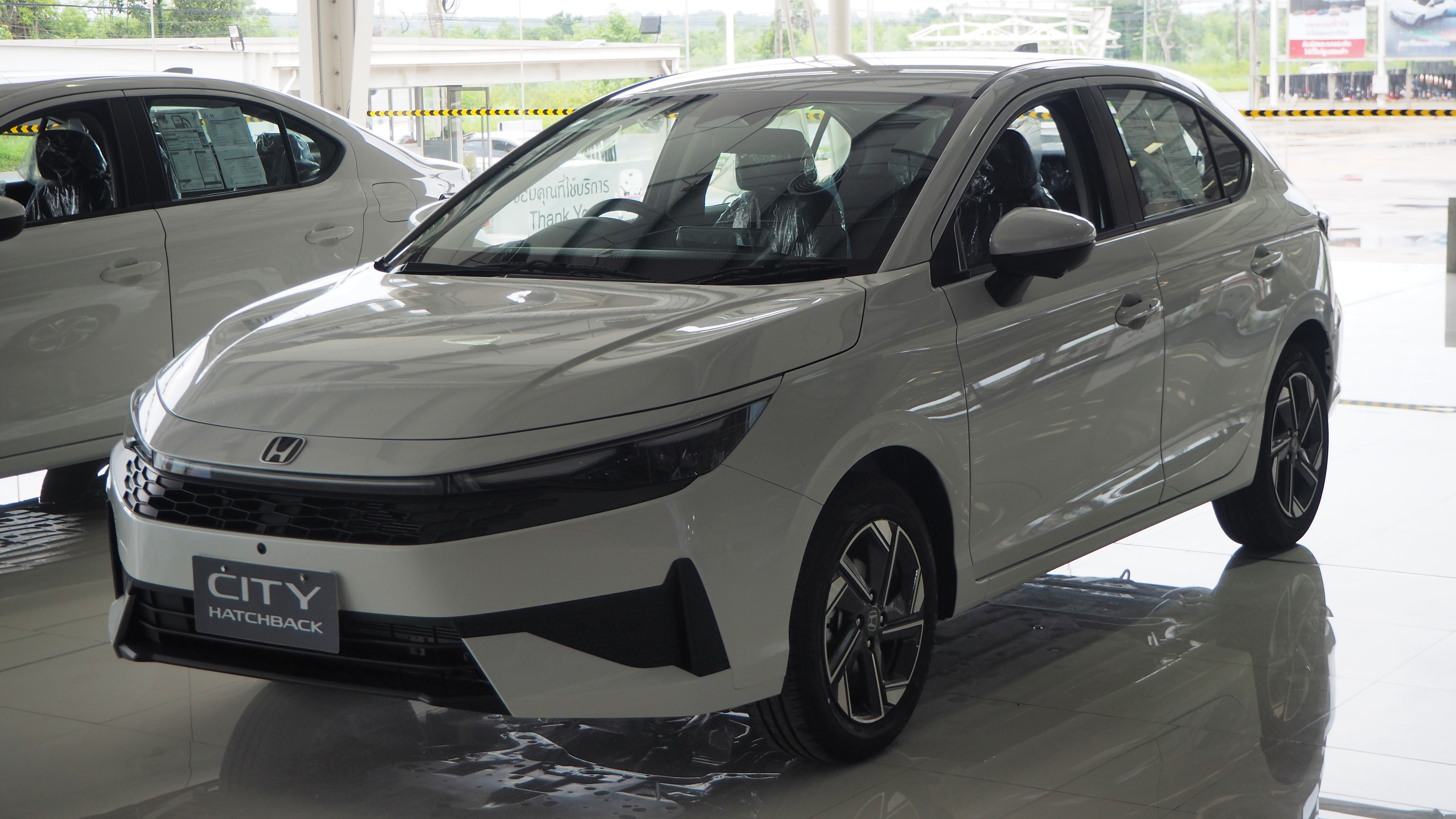
e:HEV SV Hatchback (second facelift)

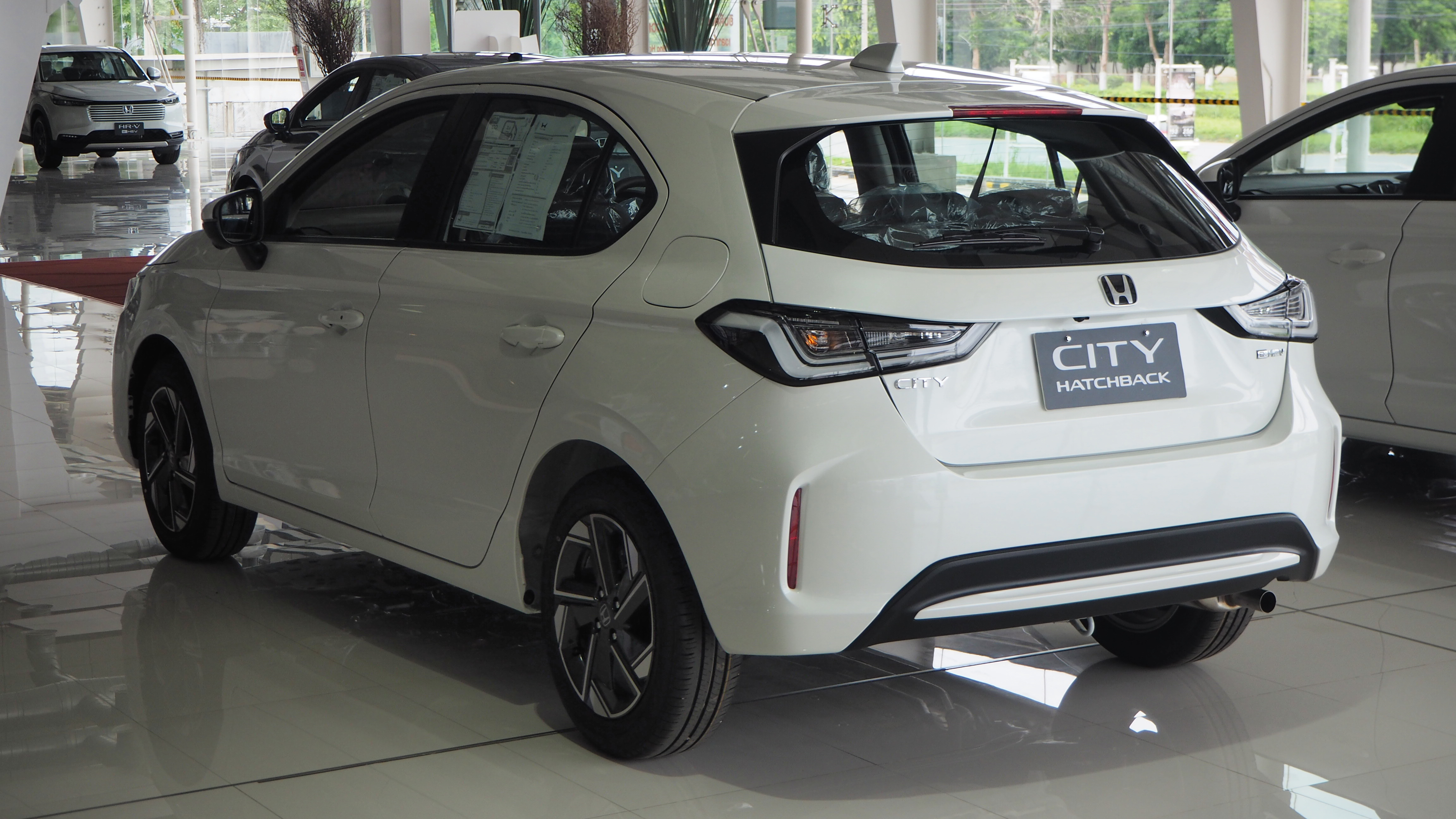
Rear view (second facelift)

=== Markets ===
==== Thailand ====
In Thailand, the City is powered by a 1.0-litre VTEC Turbo petrol engine mated to a CVT. The smaller engine and the low emission output makes it the first City to qualify the Eco Car tax incentive. Among the conditions of the tax incentive are Euro 5 compliance, CO_{2} emissions below 100 g/km (5.7 oz/mi), and a fuel consumption not exceeding 23.25 km/L (4.3 L/100 km; 66 mpg_{‑imp}; 55 mpg_{‑US}). The Thailand-spec City has a rated fuel consumption of 23.8 km/L (4.2 L/100 km; 67 mpg_{‑imp}; 56 mpg_{‑US}). Other aspects of the Phase 2 Eco Car regulation include the fitment of various safety systems such as ABS, EBD, BA and VSA as standard across the range. It is available in four trim levels: S, V, SV and RS. Sales began in Thailand on 24 December 2019.

The City Hatchback debuted in Thailand on 24 November 2020, it is offered in three trim levels: S+, SV and RS.

The City e:HEV RS was also launched in the country in the same day. The e:HEV version gets several additional features over the petrol RS, including paddle shift to adjust the regenerative braking intensity, a 7.0-inch instrument cluster display, Honda LaneWatch blind spot camera, rear AC vents, and rear disc brakes which in turn allows for an electric parking brake to be installed. The City Hatchback e:HEV RS was also launched in Thailand on 24 June 2021, with similar features as the sedan version.

The first-facelifted City was launched in the Thai market on 5 July 2023, it is available in three trim levels: V, SV and RS. It is powered with the same 1.0-litre VTEC Turbo petrol engine mated to a CVT for V, SV and RS trim levels, while the 1.5-litre e:HEV naturally-aspirated engine is available on SV and RS trim levels, the S Turbo trim was discontinued from the lineup, but the S Turbo trim was re-introduced on 22 March 2024. Honda Sensing suite of safety assist technologies is standard on all trim levels. The first-facelifted City Hatchback was also launched in the Thailand on 7 February 2024, it is available in five variants: S+, SV, RS, e:HEV SV and e:HEV RS. In November 2025, the City was made available with The Black Outshine special edition variant based on the e:HEV SV variant, features black exterior elements.

The second-facelifted City and City Hatchback was launched in the Thai market on 22 May 2026 and pricing was announced on 1 July 2026, it is available in four trim levels: S, V, SV and RS. It is powered with the same 1.0-litre VTEC Turbo petrol engine mated to a CVT for S trim levels, while the 1.5-litre e:HEV naturally-aspirated engine is available on V, SV and RS trim levels.

==== India ====
The City sedan was unveiled and launched officially as Honda City 5th Generation in India on 16 July 2020. It was sold alongside the old model which continued to be produced there. The Indian-market City is offered in three trim levels – V, VX and ZX – with a choice of petrol and diesel 1.5-litre four-cylinder engines. The petrol engine uptrimd i-VTEC unit with DOHC (previously SOHC), with the other being an i-DTEC turbo-diesel. Both engines are paired with a 6-speed manual transmission as standard, with the CVT option only available for the petrol version.

All trim levels are fitted with ESC, rear ISOFIX anchorages, neck restraints and three-point seatbelts for all five passengers, dual front airbags, front torso-protecting side airbags, traction control and hill start assistance as standard, the VX and ZX trim levels are equipped with head-protecting curtain airbags, and the ZX trim is fitted with a blind spot monitor.

For the first time, the top-spec City is equipped with Honda's LaneWatch camera system. Other notable features include 8.0-inch touchscreen audio system with Alexa remote capability and support for Android Auto and Apple CarPlay, 7.0-inch digital instrument cluster display, and sunroof.

Honda Cars India announced the market launch of the City e:HEV in April 2022. This powertrain is expected to be available on the ZX trim. In addition, this trim is the first Honda model in India to offer Honda Sensing which includes safety assist technologies.

The first-facelifted City was launched on 2 March 2023 in both petrol and e:HEV engines. The petrol engine is available in four trim levels: SV, V, VX and ZX, while the e:HEV engine is available in two trim levels: V and ZX. The City also gets Honda Sensing which includes safety assist technologies in both and Wireless Charging, while the i-DTEC turbo-diesel engine was discontinued from the lineup due to poor sales. The car sold less than half of the figure for FY23 in FY24.This was attributed to rising consumer preference for SUVs.

The second-facelifted City was launched, alongside the ZR-V on 22 May 2026.

==== Malaysia ====
The City sedan was revealed in Malaysia on 24 August 2020 and launched to the market on 13 October 2020. It is available in 4 trim levels: S, E, V and e:HEV RS. The S, E, and V trim levels are powered by the 1.5-litre L15ZF DOHC naturally-aspirated petrol engine, while the top-of-the-line RS trim is offered with an Intelligent Multi-Mode Drive (i-MMD) hybrid version to go along with the 1.5-litre LEB-H5 DOHC naturally-aspirated engine. The e:HEV RS trim received several features from the other trim levels including an electronic parking brake with auto brake hold function and a full Honda Sensing driver assistance safety suite which includes adaptive cruise control.

The V Sensing trim was launched on 3 November 2021. Unlike the normal V trim, it is equipped with 7-inch semi-digital instrument cluster panel and Honda Sensing safety and driver assist system similar to the e:HEV RS trim.

The City Hatchback was launched on 7 December 2021. It is offered in S, E, V and e:HEV RS trim levels, same with the City sedan. Like the sedan counterpart, the S, E, and V trim levels are powered by the 1.5-litre L15ZF DOHC naturally-aspirated engine, while the top-of-the-line RS trim is offered with an Intelligent Multi-Mode Drive (i-MMD) hybrid version to go along with the 1.5-litre LEB-H5 DOHC naturally-aspirated engine.

The V Sensing trim was launched on 11 April 2022. Like its sedan counterpart, it is equipped with 7-inch semi-digital instrument cluster panel and Honda Sensing safety and driver assist system similar to the e:HEV RS trim.

The first-facelifted City sedan was launched on 10 August 2023 after Honda Malaysia opened new bookings on 18 July 2023. It is offered in S, E, V and RS trim levels. The range-topping RS trim is available in both petrol and e:HEV powertrain. Honda Sensing became standard on all trim levels.

The first-facelifted City Hatchback was launched on 16 May 2024, with same trim levels and powertrain options. The V Sensing trim has been replaced by the non-e:HEV RS variant.

The second-facelifted City sedan was launched on 24 September 2026, with three variants; V, RS petrol, RS hybrid. For the second-facelift model, the S trim was discontinued. All trims use the 1.5-litre L15ZF DOHC petrol engine as standard while the 1.5-litre e:HEV petrol hybrid remains exclusive to the range-topping RS trim.

The second-facelifted City Hatchback was launched on 19 October 2026, with three variants: V, RS petrol, RS hybrid. The S and E trims were discontinued.

==== Philippines ====
The City sedan was launched in the Philippines alongside the facelifted Honda CR-V on 22 October 2020. The new City was imported from Thailand instead of being locally assembled in the defunct Honda Santa Rosa plant. The only engine released in the Philippine market is the 1.5-litre i-VTEC engine. Known as the L15ZF, the engine is relatively similar to the L15Z engine found in previous models with the exception of dual overhead cams and further implementation of Honda's Earth Dreams technology. Transmission options include a 6-speed manual and CVT. Initially, three trim levels are available in the Philippine market: S (6-speed manual and CVT), V (CVT only) and RS (CVT only).

The City Hatchback was launched on 20 April 2021 and was the first market to get the hatchback in left-hand-drive form. Only a single trim is offered, which is the RS model.

The first-facelifted City was launched on 13 July 2023 alongside the facelifted Brio. It is available in S, V, and RS trim levels, all powered with the same 1.5-litre i-VTEC engine mated to a CVT transmission. The manual transmission variant of the S trim was removed from the lineup. Honda Sensing is standard for all trim levels.

On 14 June 2024, the first-facelifted City Hatchback was launched in the Philippines in the same RS trim as the pre-facelift model. Honda Sensing was added as standard to the City Hatchback.

In February 2026, the 30th Anniversary Pearl Edition model was introduced for both the sedan and hatchback bodystyles to celebrate the 30th anniversary of the City nameplate in the Philippines.

The second-facelifted City sedan and hatchback was launched on 17 October 2026. It retains the same four trims (three for the sedan and one for the hatchback) from the first-facelifted model, with the same 1.5-litre i-VTEC engine mated to a CVT transmission on all trims.

==== South Africa ====
The Ballade was launched in South Africa on 15 November 2020, the launch coincided with the 20th anniversary of Honda Motor South Africa. Three trim levels are available: Comfort, Elegance and RS; it is powered by a 1.5-litre petrol engine paired to a CVT transmission.

The facelifted model was launched in South Africa on 29 February 2024 with same trim levels from the pre-facelifted model.

The Ballade was discontinued in November 2025, along with the BR-V, due to declining sales.

==== Vietnam ====
The City sedan was launched in Vietnam on 9 December 2020, with three trim levels: G, L and RS. All variants are powered by a 1.5-litre i-VTEC petrol engine paired to a CVT transmission. In April 2021, the E trim was added to the lineup.

The first-facelifted City was launched in Vietnam on 4 July 2023 alongside the second-generation BR-V. It is offered with the same three trim levels on the pre-facelift model, trim levels offered on the facelifted City are: G, L and RS all paired with the same 1.5-litre i-VTEC petrol engine mated to a CVT transmission, the base model E trim was discontinued from the lineup. Honda Sensing is standard on all trim levels.

The second-facelifted City was launched in Vietnam on 12 October 2026, with two trim levels: L and RS, both variants are powered by the same 1.5-litre i-VTEC petrol engine paired to a CVT transmission. For the second-facelift model, the base G trim was discontinued. Honda Sensing is standard on all trim levels.

==== Indonesia ====
The seventh-generation City was first launched in Indonesia on 3 March 2021 in its hatchback form. The City hatchback is produced in the country and directly replaced the Jazz. It went on sale on 8 April 2021. A single trim is offered, which is the RS with a 6-speed manual and CVT gearbox options. It is equipped with the 1.5-litre L15ZF engine. The City sedan followed later on 28 October 2021, which is imported from Thailand like previous models. On 20 April 2022, the City hatchback received Honda Sensing (CVT only) as an option. The City sedan received a facelift on 9 October 2023 with standard Honda Sensing. The facelifted hatchback model followed later on 13 January 2025, also with standard Honda Sensing. The manual transmission option was dropped. The City was discontinued in Indonesia in early 2026.

==== Mexico ====
The City sedan was launched in Mexico on 12 March 2021, offered in Uniq, Sport, and Prime trim levels, all of them equipped with the 1.5-litre engine and offered in either a 6-speed manual transmission or an automatic CVT. Top-spec City Touring was added for the 2022 model year, making the City available in four trim levels. The Touring trim features LED headlights and foglamps, and lots of safety features added from the Prime trim levels.

The first-facelifted City was launched on 6 December 2023, it is offered in Sport, Prime and Touring trim levels.

==== Middle East ====
The City sedan was launched in the GCC markets on 5 April 2021, it is available with a 1.5-litre petrol engine with a 6-speed CVT transmission. It is available in four trim levels DX, EX, LX and Sport. Honda Sensing is standard for the Sport trim.

The facelifted City was launched on 22 September 2023, it is still the same 1.5-litre petrol engine with a 6-speed CVT transmission. it is available in three trim levels DX, LX, and LX Sport.

==== Turkey ====
The City, sold only as a sedan, was launched in Turkey in October 2021, imported from India and coming with the 1.5-litre petrol engine with a CVT transmission. It is available in two trim levels, Elegance and Executive. The elegance trim level has been stopped sales in Turkey as of the 2024 model year due to lack of demand. The reason for the low demand is that customers buy the Executive trim level because there is little price difference between the Elegance trim level and the Executive trim level, which is a higher trim level.

==== Brazil ====
The City sedan and hatchback were introduced in Brazil on 18 November 2021. It is powered with the 1.5-litre direct injection i-VTEC DOHC engine, which was not offered in other markets before. The adoption of the direct injection system allows for a higher compression ratio and greater optimisation of the burning of the air/fuel mixture. The engine also supports flex fuel, being capable of running on a mixture of petrol and ethanol, regardless of proportion. The car is sold in the EX (sedan only), EXL and Touring trim levels.

The first-facelifted City sedan and hatchback was launched in Brazil on 30 October 2024, with four trims for both bodystyles: LX, EX, EXL and Touring, it is powered by the 1.5-litre i-VTEC petrol engine.

The second-facelifted City sedan and hatchback was launched in Brazil on 2 October 2026, with the same trim levels and engine option from the first-facelift model. For the second-facelift model, the flagship RS trim was introduced for the hatchback bodystyle.

=== Powertrain ===
Three conventional engines were offered in different markets, which are the 1.0-litre VTEC Turbo petrol engine (Thailand), 1.5-litre i-VTEC petrol engine and 1.5-litre i-DTEC diesel engine (India).

For this generation, the City e:HEV is also offered in some markets. It utilises the smallest version of Honda's Intelligent Multi-Mode Drive (i-MMD) hybrid system shared with the fourth-generation Fit/Jazz which consist of a 1.5-litre Atkinson cycle DOHC i-VTEC engine and an integrated electric motor acting as a generator and a starter. It is not equipped with a traditional gearbox driving the front wheels, however the engine can provide direct drive at higher speeds using a lock-up clutch and a single-speed transmission (e-CVT) since the ICE is more efficient than an electric motor at high speeds. For the Thai-spec model, Honda is claiming a fuel consumption figure of 17.8 km/L (5.6 L/100 km; 50 mpg_{‑imp}; 42 mpg_{‑US}) on the NEDC cycle.

Chassis code	Model	Engine	Power		Torque	Transmissions
Petrol engines
GN1 (sedan); GN7 (hatchback)	1.0 L VTEC Turbo P10A6	988 cc turbocharged I3	122 PS (90 kW; 120 hp) @ 5,500 rpm		173 N⋅m (128 lb⋅ft) @ 2,000–4,500 rpm	CVT
GN2 (sedan); GN5 (hatchback)	1.5 L i-VTEC DOHC L15ZD/L15ZE/L15ZF	1,498 cc I4	121 PS (89 kW; 119 hp) @ 6,600 rpm		145 N⋅m (107 lb⋅ft) @ 4,300 rpm	6-speed manual CVT
GN3 (sedan); GN6 (hatchback)	1.5 L e:HEV LEB-H5 / LEB8	1,497 cc Atkinson cycle hybrid I4	Engine power	98 PS (72 kW; 97 hp) @ 5,600–6,400 rpm	127 N⋅m (94 lb⋅ft) @ 4,500–5,000 rpm	eCVT
GN3 (sedan); GN6 (hatchback)	1.5 L e:HEV LEB-H5 / LEB8	1,497 cc Atkinson cycle hybrid I4	Electric motor	109 PS (80 kW; 108 hp) @ 4,000–8,000 rpm	253 N⋅m (187 lb⋅ft) @ 0–3,000 rpm	eCVT
Diesel engine
GN4	1.5 L i-DTEC N15	1,498 cc turbocharged I4	99 PS (73 kW; 98 hp) @ 3,600 rpm		200 N⋅m (148 lb⋅ft) @ 1,750 rpm	6-speed manual

=== Safety ===
ASEAN NCAP test results Honda City (2020)
Test	Points
Overall:	5 /5 stars
Adult occupant:	44.83
Child occupant:	22.82
Safety assist:	18.89

== Sales ==
By 2017, cumulative sales of the City has exceeded 3.6 million units in over 60 countries around the world since the nameplate was revived in 1996. As of 2017, cumulative sales of the City reached 700,000 in India. Sales of the City in India contributes to 25 per cent of global sales and the City is Honda's best selling model in India.

=== Asia & Middle East ===
Year	Thailand		Indonesia		Philippines		Malaysia	Vietnam	India	Pakistan	Turkey
Year	Sedan	Hatch	Sedan	Hatch	Sedan	Hatch	Malaysia	Vietnam	India	Pakistan	Turkey
1996			953	—							
1997			1,956	—							
1998	5,998		233	—					8,249	5,647	
1999	9,394		219	—					8,963		
2000	11,950		4,635	—			1,869		10,555		
2001	15,415		2,957	—			731		9,224		
2002	17,333		1,606	—			709		11,842		
2003	27,341		7,680	—			8,141		14,367		
2004	14,498		8,330	—			9,783		30,834		
2005	15,389		7,475	—			11,440		35,163		
2006	18,889		5,865	—			11,609		42,570		
2007			6,002	—			9,713				
2008			4,330	—			9,747				
2009	35,155		2,526	—			19,726		46,810		
2010	49,030		3,581	—			19,949				
2011	32,091		1,636	—			10,997		35,931		
2012	74,656		2,128	—			13,196		32,404		
2013	73,045		2,974	—			17,584		21,530		
2014	44,444		1,983	—	8,212		36,684	2,944	77,346		
2015	33,165		1,818	—	7,905		38,119	3,186	82,922		
2016	26,463		1,213	—	8,722		29,531	5,780	57,619		
2017	34,955		1,024	—	9,630		30,854	12,001	62,573		
2018	34,358		720	—	5,683		35,698	14,618	42,045		
2019	32,023		450	—	5,717		31,374	12,211	28,696	15,987	
2020	35,807		169	—	3,094		20,742	5,589	21,826	10,586	
2021	25,171	16,932	70	9,642	3,957	392	18,977	9,745	34,133	15,300	2,835
2022	23,447	21,467	630	6,197			45,369	14,696	35,209		9,445
2023	19,797	19,587	300	2,880	3,363	760	33,567	9,894	20,216		9,015
2024	15,448	17,984	31	394			29,246	10,500	11,526		
2025	12,066	16,690	0	454			27,107	10,899	8,109		

=== Americas ===
Year	Brazil		Mexico
Year	Sedan	Hatch	Mexico
2009	14,631	—N/a	2,528
2010	35,128	—N/a	6,149
2011	24,644	—N/a	3,077
2012	30,914	—N/a	2,491
2013	29,245	—N/a	5,408
2014	24,730	—N/a	2,121
2015	26,246	—N/a	4,409
2016	15,423	—N/a	16,286
2017	15,977	—N/a	6,141
2018	14,905	—N/a	15,901
2019	14,579	—N/a	11,379
2020	7,284	—N/a	9,035
2021	6,138	—N/a	7,200
2022	22,101	16,101	10,477
2023	11,845	10,802	6,122
2024	16,360	15,463	8,057
2025	17,784	15,764	5,758

=== China ===
Year	China			
Year	City	Greiz	Gienia	Everus S1
2006	41,903			
2007	68,129			
2008	56,938			
2009	113,230			
2010	132,635			
2011	123,502			24,635
2012	96,913			24,576
2013	95,313			13,913
2014	45,393			4,547
2015	50,304	13,077		3,521
2016	70,837	41,107	9,227	4,173
2017	63,662	27,692	27,675	
2018	44,751	17,651	17,550	
2019	33,029	6,463	6,626	
2020	2			
