= Lingxi =

Lingxi may refer to the following towns in China:

- Lingxi, Cangnan (Chinese: 灵溪), seat of Cangnan County, Zhejiang
- Lingxi, Yongshun (Chinese: 灵溪), seat of Yongshun County, Hunan
- Lingxi, Cili (Chinese: 零溪), Cili County, Hunan

Lingxi may also refer to:

- Lingxi, a marque of Dongfeng Honda car company
