= Laguna Honda =

Laguna Honda may refer to:

- Laguna Honda, San Francisco, California, USA; a neighborhood of Forest Hill
  - Laguna Honda station, now Forest Hill station, on the San Francisco Muni Metro
  - Laguna Honda Hospital
- Laguna Honda Reservoir, San Francisco, California, USA
- Laguna Honda trolleybus route, San Francisco, California, USA; see List of defunct San Francisco Municipal Railway lines

== See also ==
- Laguna (disambiguation)
- Honda (disambiguation)
