= Lingxi L =

Battery electric mid-size sedan

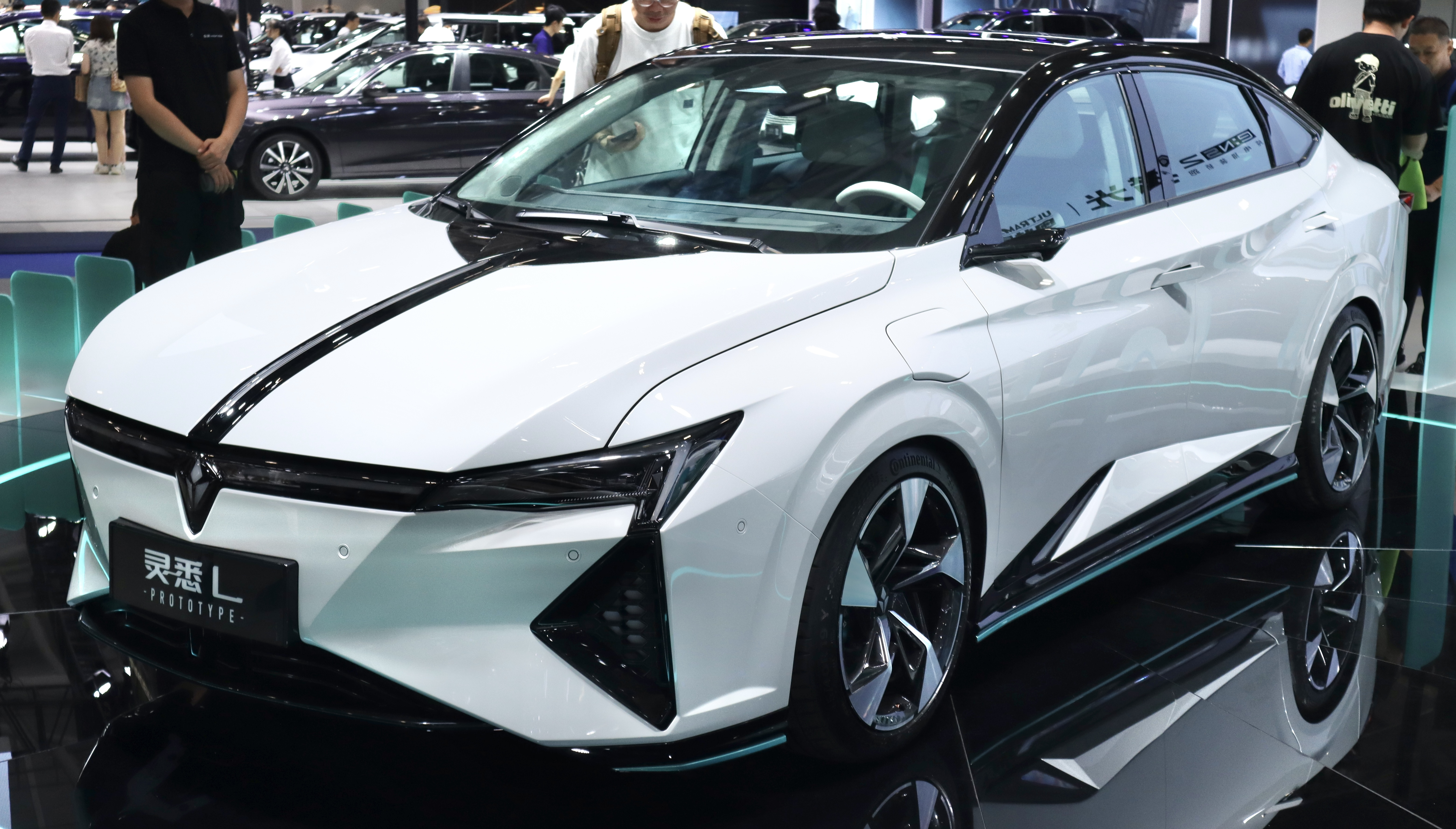

Overview
- Manufacturer: Lingxi (Dongfeng Honda)
- Production: September 2024 – present
- Assembly: China: Wuhan (Dongfeng Honda)

Body and chassis
- Class: Mid-size car (D)
- Body style: 4-door sedan
- Layout: FF layout

Powertrain
- Electric motor: 160 kW PMSM
- Battery: 59.22 kWh LFP
- Electric range: 520 km (323 mi) (CLTC)

Dimensions
- Wheelbase: 2,731 mm (107.5 in)
- Length: 4,830 mm (190.2 in)
- Width: 1,845 mm (72.6 in)
- Height: 1,503 mm (59.2 in)
- Curb weight: 1,702 kg (3,752 lb)

The Lingxi L (Chinese: 灵悉L) is a battery electric mid-size sedan produced by Lingxi for the Chinese market through the Dongfeng Honda joint venture.

== Overview ==
The marque was launched in September 2023 with a concept car, the Lingxi L, which was subsequently shown as a near-production prototype at the April 2024 Beijing Auto Show and was formally launched for sales in September 2024.

== Specifications ==
The Lingxi L is 4,830 mm (190.2 in) long and sits on a relatively short wheelbase of 2,731 mm (107.5 in). The interior features five digital screens, two of which are used for the standard rear view cameras which are standard.

The battery is a 59 kW·h lithium iron phosphate pack driving a single front motor with 160 kW (218 PS; 215 bhp) and a top speed of 160 km/h (99 mph).

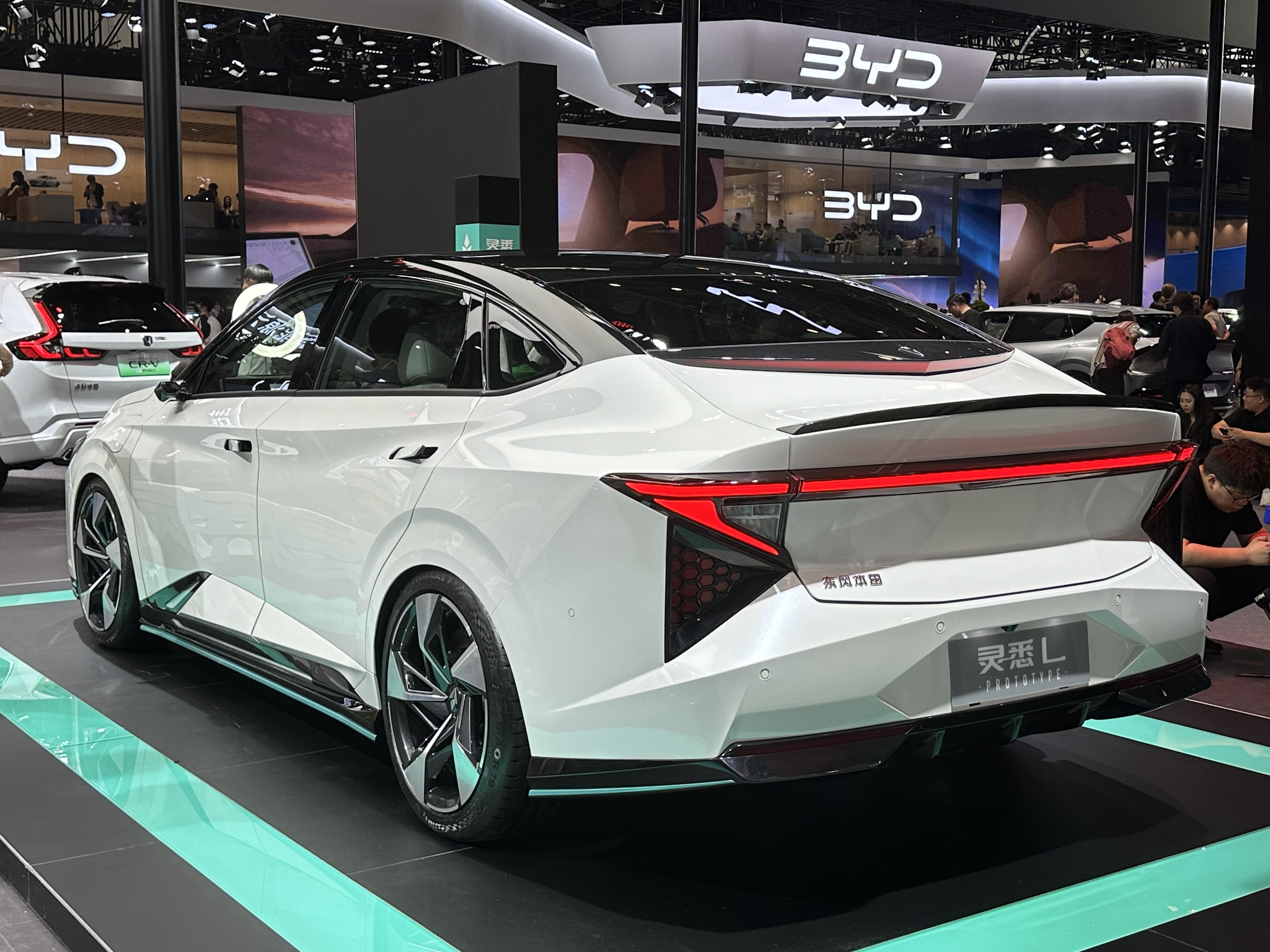
Rear view

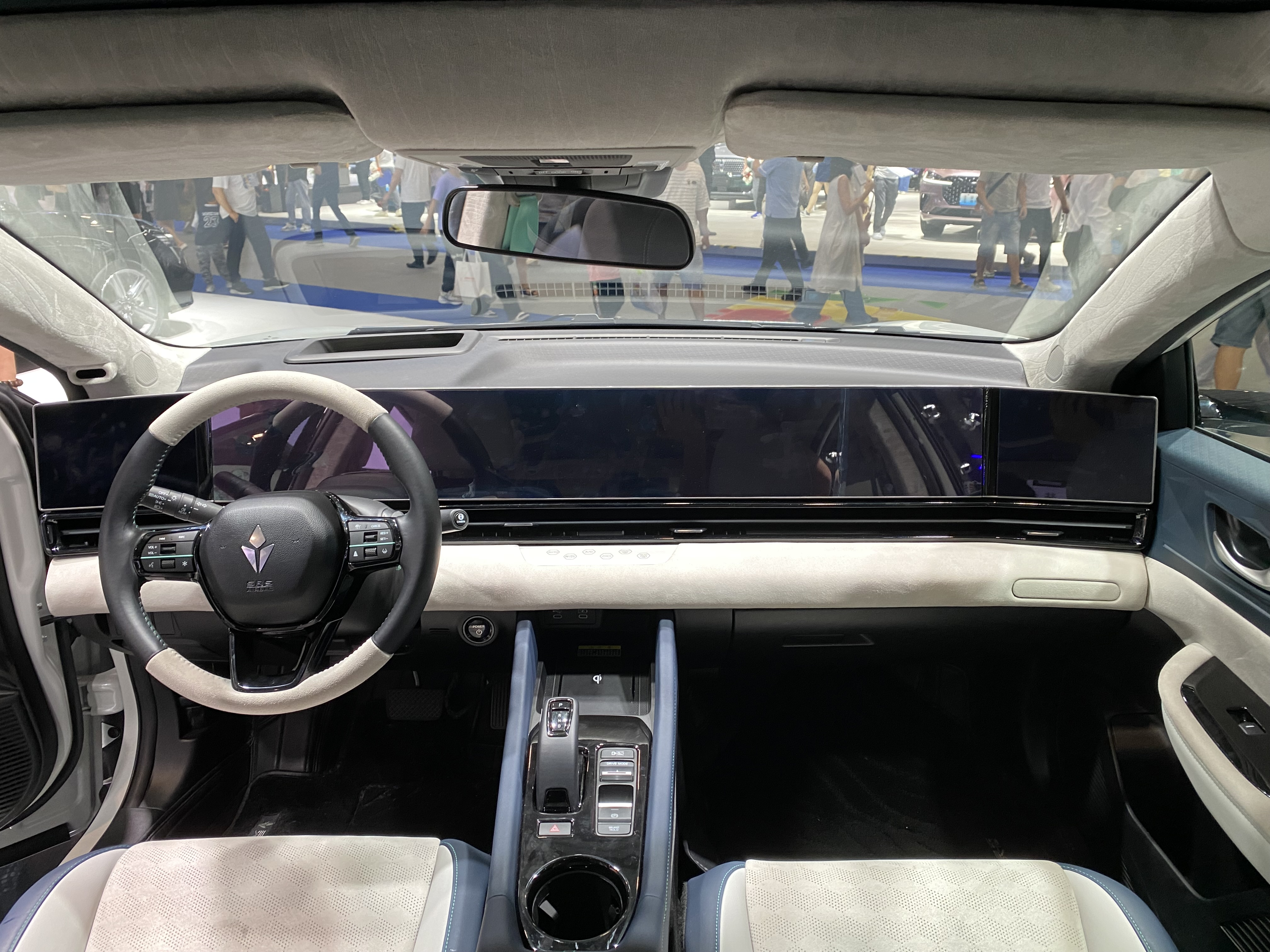
Interior

== Sales ==
Year	China
2024	413
