= Honda (disambiguation) =

Honda is a Japanese public multinational conglomerate manufacturer of automobiles, motorcycles and power equipment.

Honda may also refer to:

== Companies ==
=== Air Transportation ===
- Honda Aircraft Company
- Honda Airport

=== Engines ===
- GE Honda Aero Engines (50%)

=== Motorsports ===
- Honda Racing F1
- Honda Racing

=== Transportation ===
- American Honda Motor Company
  - Honda Performance Development
- Atlas Honda motorcycles (Pakistan)
- Dongfeng Honda (China) (50%)
- Guangqi Honda (50%)
  - Everus (Li Nian)
  - Honda Automobile (China)
- Honda Atlas Cars (Pakistan)
- Honda Canada Inc.
- Honda Cars India
  - Honda Motorcycle and Scooter India
- Honda Taiwan
- Honda UK Manufacturing
- Montesa Honda (Spain)

=== Other ===
- Mobilityland (100%)

== Places ==
- Honda Bay, in Puerto Princesa, Philippines
- Honda Center, an arena in Anaheim, California, United States
- Honda, Tolima, a municipality in Colombia
- Bahia Honda Key, an island in the Florida Keys, United States
- Bahía Honda, Cuba, a municipality in Cuba

== Geology ==
- Honda Group, fossiliferous geological group in Colombia, named after Honda, Tolima

== People ==
- Honda (surname)

== Other uses ==
- Honda knot, often used to tie a lasso
- "Honda", a song by FKA Twigs featuring Pa Salieu from Caprisongs
- "Honda", a song by Friday Night Plans
