= Honda (surname) =

Honda (written: 本田 literally "root ricefield" or "origin ricefield", 本多 lit. "root/origin many" or 誉田 lit. "honor ricefield") is a Japanese surname.

Notable people with the surname include:

== Business ==
- Hirotoshi Honda (本田 博俊; born 1942), Japanese business magnate, engineer, founder of Mugen Motorsports
- Keiji Honda (本多 圭司; born 1957), Japanese businessman
- Soichiro Honda (本田 宗一郎; 1906–1991), Japanese engineer and industrialist, founder of Honda Motor Company

== Media, arts, and entertainment ==
- A. Honda (本田 A), one of the duo manga artists under the pen name Akira Himekawa
- Chieko Honda (本多 知恵子; 1963–2013), Japanese actress and voice actress
- Hiroshi Honda (1910–1970), American painter
- Hitomi Honda (本田 仁美; born 2001), Japanese singer and actress, former member of girl groups AKB48 and Iz*One
- Ishirō Honda (本多 猪四郎; 1911–1993), Japanese filmmaker
- Katsuhiro Honda (本田 勝裕; born 1965), Japanese record producer and DJ known as DJ Honda
- Kyoya Honda (本田 響矢; born 1999), Japanese actor and model
- Masato Honda (本田 雅人; born 1962), Japanese saxophone player, composer, multi-instrumentalist
- Minako Honda (本田 美奈子; 1967–2005), Japanese singer
- Takako Honda (本田 貴子; born 1972), Japanese voice actress
- Takaya Honda (born 1987), Australian actor and television presenter
- Takeshi Honda (本田 雄; born 1968), Japanese animator, designer, and animation director
- Toshiyuki Honda (本多 俊之; born 1957), Japanese jazz musician and composer
- Tsubasa Honda (本田 翼; born 1992), Japanese actress and model
- Yuka Honda (本田 ゆか; born 1961), Japanese-American musician

== Samurai ==
- Komatsu Honda (本多 小松; 1573–1620), Japanese female warrior (onna-musha) during the Azuchi-Momoyama period and early Edo period
- Masamori Honda (本多 正訥; 1827–1885), Japanese daimyō of Tanaka Domain
- Tadakatsu Honda (本多 忠勝; 1548–1610), Japanese samurai, general, and daimyō of the late Sengoku through early Edo period
- Tadamasa Honda (本多 忠政; 1575–1631), Japanese daimyō of the early Edo period, who ruled the Kuwana Domain and then the Himeji Domain
- Tadatomo Honda (本多 忠朝; 1582–1615), Japanese samurai lord during the Azuchi–Momoyama period and early Edo period
- Masanobu Honda (本多 正信; 1538–1616), Commander and daimyō. Strategist and political advisor in service of Tokugawa Ieyasu during the Azuchi–Momoyama period and early Edo period.
- Masazumi Honda (本多 正純; 1566–1637), Samurai then Daimyō in service of Tokugawa Clan during the Azuchi–Momoyama period and early Edo period
- Shigetsugu Honda (本多 重次; 1529–1596), Samurai in service of Tokugawa Clan during the Azuchi–Momoyama period. Known as the author of Japan's shortest letter, sent to his wife from the battlefield.

== Science and technology ==
- Kotaro Honda (本多 光太郎; 1870–1954), Japanese metallurgist, scientist, inventor
- Masaji Honda (本田 正次; 1897–1984), Japanese botanist
- Minoru Honda (本田 実; 1913–1990), Japanese astronomer
- Taira Honda (本田 平; 1932–1975), Japanese mathematician

== Sport ==
- Akihiko Honda (本田 明彦; born 1947), Japanese professional boxing promoter
- Daisaburo Honda (本田 大三郎; born 1935), Japanese sprint canoeist
- Erina Honda (本田 恵利奈; born 1994), Japanese badminton player
- Gene Honda, American sports announcer
- Keisuke Honda (本田 圭佑; born 1986), Japanese former professional footballer and manager
- Lucas Tsuyoshi Honda (本田 ルーカス剛史; born 2002), Japanese figure skater
- Marin Honda (本田 真凜; born 2001), Japanese retired figure skater
- Mayu Honda (本田 万結; born 2004), Japanese judoka
- Ryuki Honda (本田 竜輝; born 2000), Japanese professional wrestler
- Soichiro Honda (本多 宗一郎; born 1978), Japanese professional wrestler known as Antonio Honda
- Tadashi Honda (本多 忠; born 1951), Japanese former swimmer
- Takeshi Honda (本田 武史; born 1981), Japanese former competitive figure skater
- Tamon Honda (本田 多聞; born 1963), Japanese semi-retired professional wrestler and former Olympic amateur wrestler
- Tomoru Honda (本多 灯; born 1998), Japanese competitive swimmer
- Toru Honda (誉田 徹; born 1941), Japanese former sprinter
- Yuichi Honda (本多 雄一; born 1984), Japanese former professional baseball player
- Yuki Honda (本多 勇喜; born 1991), Japanese footballer

== Other ==
- Chikaatsu Honda (本田 親徳; 1822–1889), Japanese Shinto priest
- Hiroshi Honda (disambiguation), multiple people
- Katsuichi Honda (本多 勝一; born 1932), Japanese journalist and author
- Kei Honda (本田 奎; born 1997), Japanese professional shogi player
- Mike Honda (born 1941), American politician and former educator
- Sayuri Honda (本田 小百合; born 1978), Japanese professional shogi player

== Fictional characters ==
- E. Honda, character in the Street Fighter series
- Kiku Honda (Japan), one of main characters in Hetalia: Axis Powers
- Hayato Honda, a character in Kochira Katsushika-ku Kameari Kōen-mae Hashutsujo
- Hiroto Honda (Tristan Taylor), character in the Yu-Gi-Oh! series
- Keiko Honda, character in the manga series Crayon Shin-chan
- Kyoko Honda and Tohru Honda, characters in the manga/anime series Fruits Basket
- Mami Honda, character in the manga Gals!
- Mio Honda, character in the video game The iDOLM@STER Cinderella Girls
- Piston Hondo, formerly known as Piston Honda; a character in the Punch-Out!! series
- Sakura Honda, the female version of Kiku Honda from Hetalia: Axis Powers. Appears in season 5.
- Shigekuni Honda, central character in The Sea of Fertility quartet by Yukio Mishima
- Tamaki Honda (本田 珠輝), protagonist of the manga series Magic of Stella
