= Hiroshi Honda =

Hiroshi Honda may refer to:

- Hiroshi Honda (handballer) (本田 洋, born 1947), Japanese former handball player
- Hiroshi Honda (painter) (1910–1970), American painter
