= Ciimo =

Chinese car brand owned by Dongfeng Honda

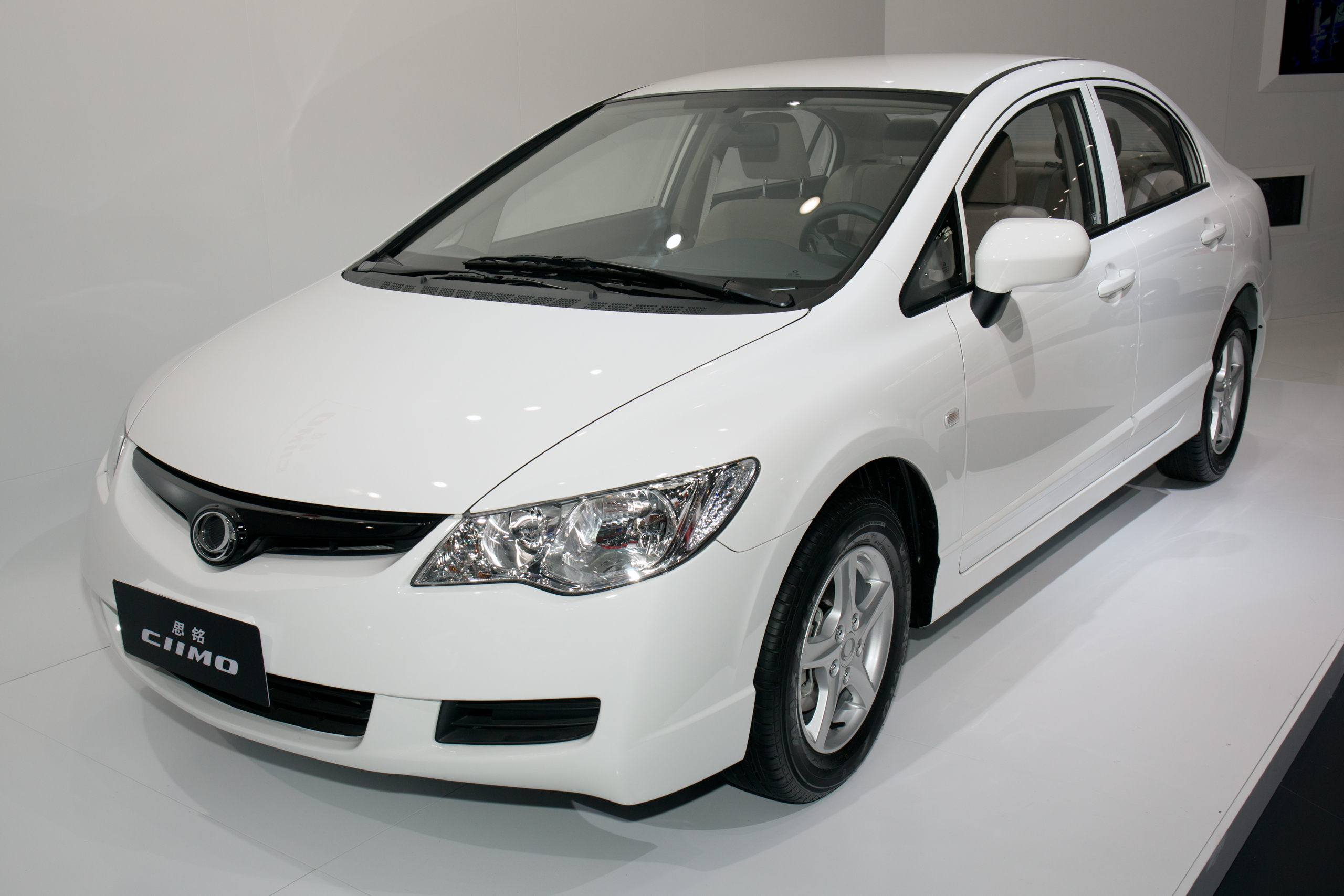
- Ciimo 1.8, in the 2016 Auto China
- Current owner: Dongfeng Honda Automobile
- Country: China
- Introduced: 2011; 15 years ago
- Markets: China
- Website: http://www.dongfeng-honda-ciimo.com/

Ciimo (Chinese: 思铭) was a car brand from the People's Republic of China for the Chinese market. It is owned by Dongfeng Honda. The Ciimo brand's second product is the X-NV, which is a rebadged Honda HR-V featuring slightly restyled front end design and clear tail lamps.

== History ==
It was unveiled at the 2011 Guangzhou Motor Show. Its first and only vehicle based on the 8th generation Honda Civic was unveiled at the 2012 Beijing Auto Show. The vehicle went on sale in April 2012.

However, since it was a vehicle that was simply badge-engineered from an older Civic and did not have many specifications, production was discontinued in April 2015, its third year. It resumed production in 2016 with a facelifted vehicle, but the indifferent market response and limited specifications led to the vehicle's discontinuation and the brand was briefly halted in 2017. However, electric vehicles are currently being badge-engineered and sold. When Honda needed an EV in 2019 to comply with China’s NEV-policy, Dongfeng Honda bolted a battery pack below the floor of its best-selling Honda HRV and resurrected the Ciimo brand for this compliance car. The Ciimo X-NV sells in very small quantities. Nonetheless Dongfeng-Honda added a slightly restyled version as Ciimo M-NV to the lineup in 2020.

== Products ==
- Ciimo X-NV (2019–2024)
- Ciimo M-NV (2021–2024)
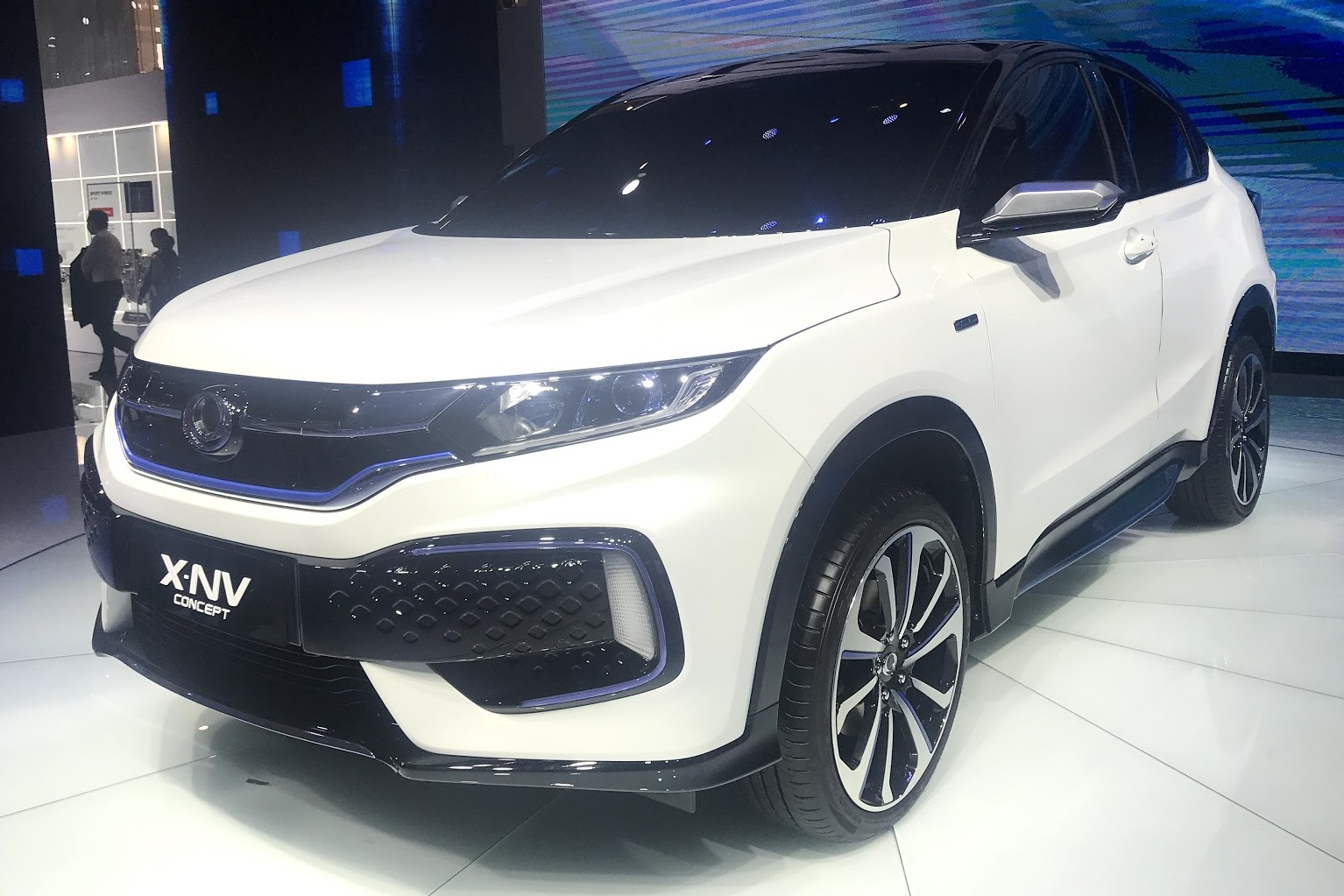
Ciimo X-NV

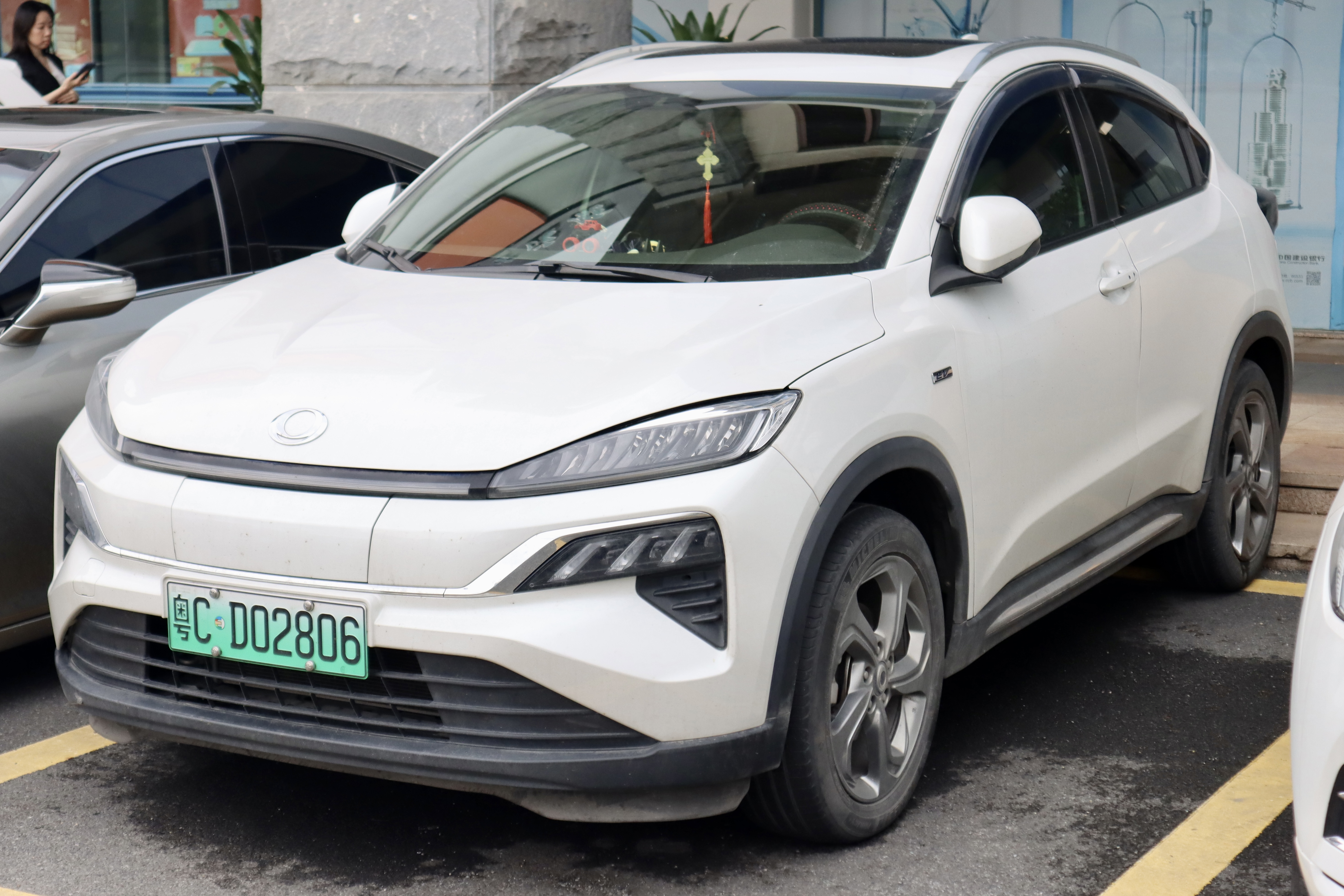
Ciimo M-NV
