= Lingxi, Cili =

Lingxi Town 零溪镇
- Town
- Location in Hunan
- Coordinates: 29°22′14″N 111°10′18″E
- Country: People's Republic of China
- Province: Hunan
- Prefecture-level city: Zhangjiajie
- County: Cili

Area
  - Total: 103.5 km^{2} (40.0 sq mi)

Population
  - Total: 27,000
  - Density: 260/km^{2} (680/sq mi)
- Time zone: UTC+8 (China Standard)
- Area code: 0744

Lingxi Town (simplified Chinese: 零溪镇; traditional Chinese: 零溪鎮; pinyin: Língxī Zhèn) is an urban town in Cili County, Hunan Province, People's Republic of China.

== Administrative divisions ==
The town is divided into 16 villages and 1 community, which include the following areas: Moyuan Community, Dazhuang Village, Yanziqiao Village, Nanmu Village, Wangjiaqiao Village, Jianhua Village, Yanxi Village, Gaofeng Village, Heta Village, Xiangbi Village, Liangcha Village, Xingqi Village, Jinling Village, Yanqiao Village, Erdougang Village, Huanglian Village, and Baishou Village (墨园社区、大庄村、燕子桥村、楠木村、汪家桥村、拣花村、岩溪村、高峰村、河塌村、象鼻村、两岔村、星旗村、金陵村、岩桥村、二斗岗村、黄莲村、百寿村).
