= Hiroshi Honda (painter) =

American painter (1910–1970)

Internees Gaming by the Camp Fence, watercolor and ink on paper by Hiroshi Honda, c. 1945–59, Honolulu Museum of Art

Hiroshi Honda (1910–1970) was an American painter who was born in Hilo, Hawaii, to Japanese parents who had immigrated to Hawaii at the turn of the 20th century. He was sent to Kumamoto at age six to study and help with the family business, and while there studied sumi-e ink painting. He was conscripted into the Japanese Air Force as a young man, and served for seven years before being wounded and discharged. He returned to Hilo in 1939 and took a job teaching at a local Japanese language school, occasionally doing commercial painting work on the side. In 1940, he met a Nisei woman, Sadako Hashida, and the couple married and moved to Honolulu soon after.

Once in Honolulu, Honda began teaching at a Nu'uanu Japanese school, and he spent the morning of the December 7, 1941 attack on Pearl Harbor at the school. Upon returning home, he was arrested by military police and eventually interned at Sand Island. His wife gave birth to the couple's first child in May 1942, and a few months later, upon learning that Honda would be transferred to an internment camp on the mainland, volunteered to accompany him along with her father and sister. Honda was removed from the transport ship at the last minute, resulting in his separation from the family for several months; Sadako and the others were first sent to Jerome, Arkansas, before being transferred to California. Later, in 1943, Sadako's father and sister were assigned to Manzanar, while Honda, Sadako, and their infant son were reunited in the maximum-security Tule Lake Segregation Center. While in Tule Lake, the couple had two more children, a daughter and a second son, and Honda produced many drawings and watercolor paintings.

After the war, the Hondas moved to New York, where Hiroshi studied under Yasuo Kuniyoshi, while Sadako worked as a seamstress to support the family. In 1949, the family moved back to Hilo, but Honda soon grew dissatisfied working for his wife's family's agriculture business and returned to New York alone. Sadako eventually remarried to Honda's brother, who had provided financial support to the family after Honda left. Little information on Honda's later life exists on record, but sources suggest that he remained in New York and remarried, as well.

The Honolulu Museum of Art, which owns a large collection of Hiroshi Honda's works, has held two solo exhibitions of this artist— Reflections of Internment: The Art of Hawaii's Hiroshi Honda in 1994 and Hiroshi Honda: Detained in 2012.
