= Dongfeng Honda =

Chinese automobile manufacturing company

Dongfeng Honda Automobile Co., Ltd.

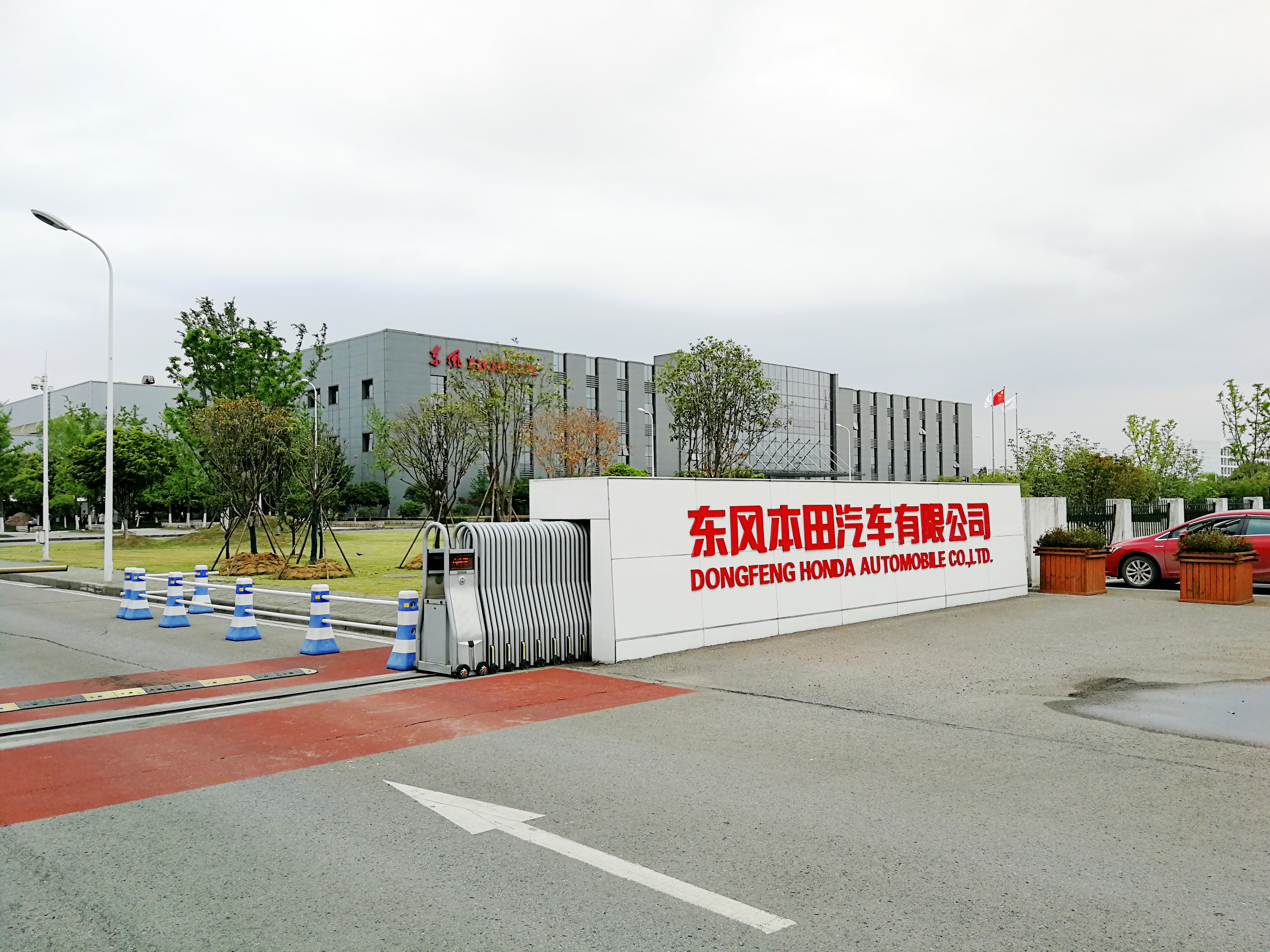
- Native name: 东风本田汽车有限公司
- Type: Joint venture
- Industry: Automotive
- Founded: July 2003; 23 years ago (Wuhan)
- Headquarters: Wuhan, Hubei, China
- Key people: Takehiro Watanabe (General Manager)
- Products: Automobiles
- Production output: ▲740,090 (2018)
- Parent: Dongfeng Motor Group (50%); Honda Motor Company (40%); Honda Motor (China) Investment Co Ltd (10%)
- Website: www.dongfeng-honda.com

Dongfeng Honda

Chinese name
- Simplified Chinese: 东风本田
- Traditional Chinese: 東風本田
Transcriptions
Standard Mandarin
- Hanyu Pinyin: Dōngfēng Běntián
- Wade–Giles: Tung^{1}-feng^{1} Pen^{3}-t'ien^{2}
- IPA: [tʊ́ŋfə́ŋ pəntʰi̯ɛn]
Yue: Cantonese
- Yale Romanization: Dūngfūng Búntìhn
- Jyutping: Dung1 fung1 bun2 tin4

Japanese name
- Kanji: 東風本田 (Note: In Japanese, the name of the company may be written as 東風ホンダ from the combination of the two kanji for "Dongfeng" and katakana for Honda.)
- Hiragana: とうふうほんだ or とんぷうほんだ
Transcriptions
- Revised Hepburn: Tōfū Honda or Tonpū Honda

Dongfeng Honda Automobile Co., Ltd. is an automobile manufacturing company headquartered in Wuhan, China, and a 50:50 joint-venture between Dongfeng Motor Group and Honda Motor Company. It currently produces a variety of Honda models also available in other markets and a handful of China-only products. The company sells vehicles under the Honda and Ciimo marques.

According to Honda, the total production capacity for the two plants of Dongfeng Honda in Wuhan, were 480,000 units, yearly. However, Dongfeng Motor Group reported that 713,840 units were produced by Dongfeng Honda in 2017.

== History ==
Dongfeng Honda was established in July 2003 and began automobile production in April 2004 with the Honda CR-V sport utility vehicle.

In February 2006, Dongfeng Honda completed a 2.8 billion yuan (US$340 million) expansion of its production facility quadrupling production capacity to 120,000 units. In May 2008, it announced plans to double production capacity to 240,000 vehicles a year with an investment of 10 billion RMB. In 2010, Dongfeng Honda's first sub-brand Ciimo was founded, with first model presented in 2011.

As of 2011, product part-content included parts manufactured in Japan. Honda builds a second Wuhan factory in 2012, a third in 2018, takes over an idle Shenlong factory in 2021 and announces an all-new BEV-only factory earlier this year. Almost at the same time as Dongfeng Honda, the Japanese set up a third joint venture plant called Honda Automobile (China). Honda owns a majority of 65%, GAC holds 25% and Dongfeng has 10%. This plant is only used for export to Asia and the Middle East.

In 2022, the company became more heavily involved in sourcing batteries for electric vehicles. In 2023, a second sub-brand of the joint venture, Lingxi, was introduced, under which exclusively electric cars are to be marketed. The first model is the 4.83 meter long sedan Lingxi L.

In August 2025, Dongfeng Motor Group announced the termination of its partnership with Honda, due to losses related to the production of combustion cars and the Chinese market's shift to electric vehicles.

== Operations ==
As of 2016, Dongfeng Honda had two completed production bases and a third planned. The proposed factory will be situated near its 2004 and 2012 production bases in Wuhan, Hubei.

== Products ==
=== Honda ===
- CR-V (2004–present)
- Civic (2006–present)
- Elysion (2012–present)
- HR-V (2023–present)
- Inspire (2018–present)
- UR-V (2017–present)
- XR-V (2014–present)
- e:NS2 (2024–present)
- S7 (2025–present)
- GT

=== Ciimo ===
Ciimo is a sub-marque of Dongfeng Honda launched in April 2012 and aimed at first-time car buyers. It markets a rebadged eighth-generation Honda Civic featuring the design of the Japanese market model. The Ciimo brand's second product is the X-NV, which is a rebadged Honda XR-V featuring slightly restyled front end design and clear tail lamps.

=== Lingxi ===
Lingxi is a new energy vehicle brand under the Dongfeng Honda joint venture, established in September 2023. The Lingxi L is the first electric vehicle under the brand.

- Lingxi L (2024-present)

== Former products ==
=== Ciimo ===
- Ciimo 1.8 (2012–2016)

=== Honda ===
- Envix (2019–2025)
- e:NS1 (2021–2025)
- Life (2020–2025)
- Spirior (2009–2018)
- Gienia (2016–2019)
- Greiz (2015–2019)
- Jade (2013–2020)

== Gallery ==
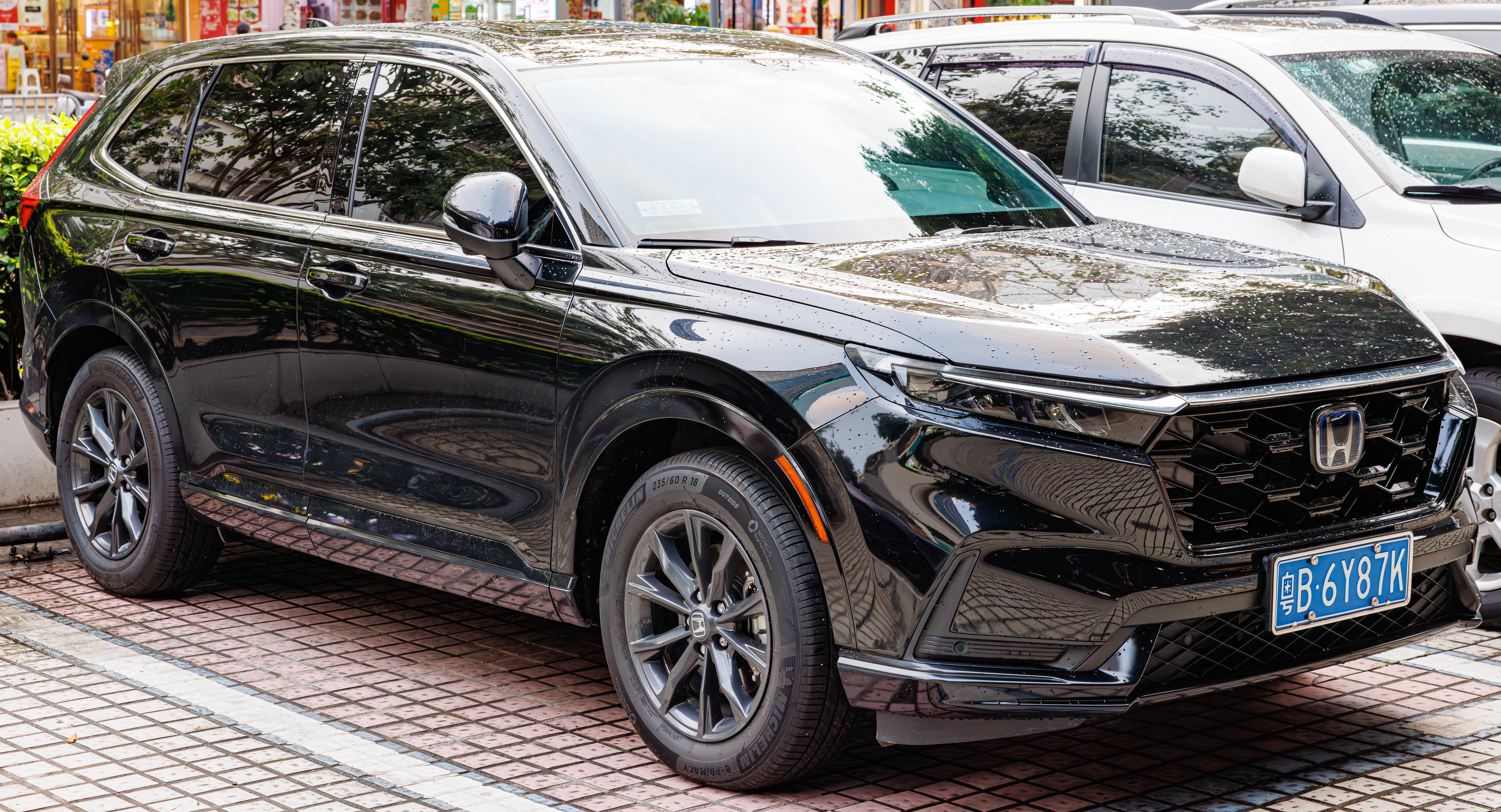
Honda CR-V

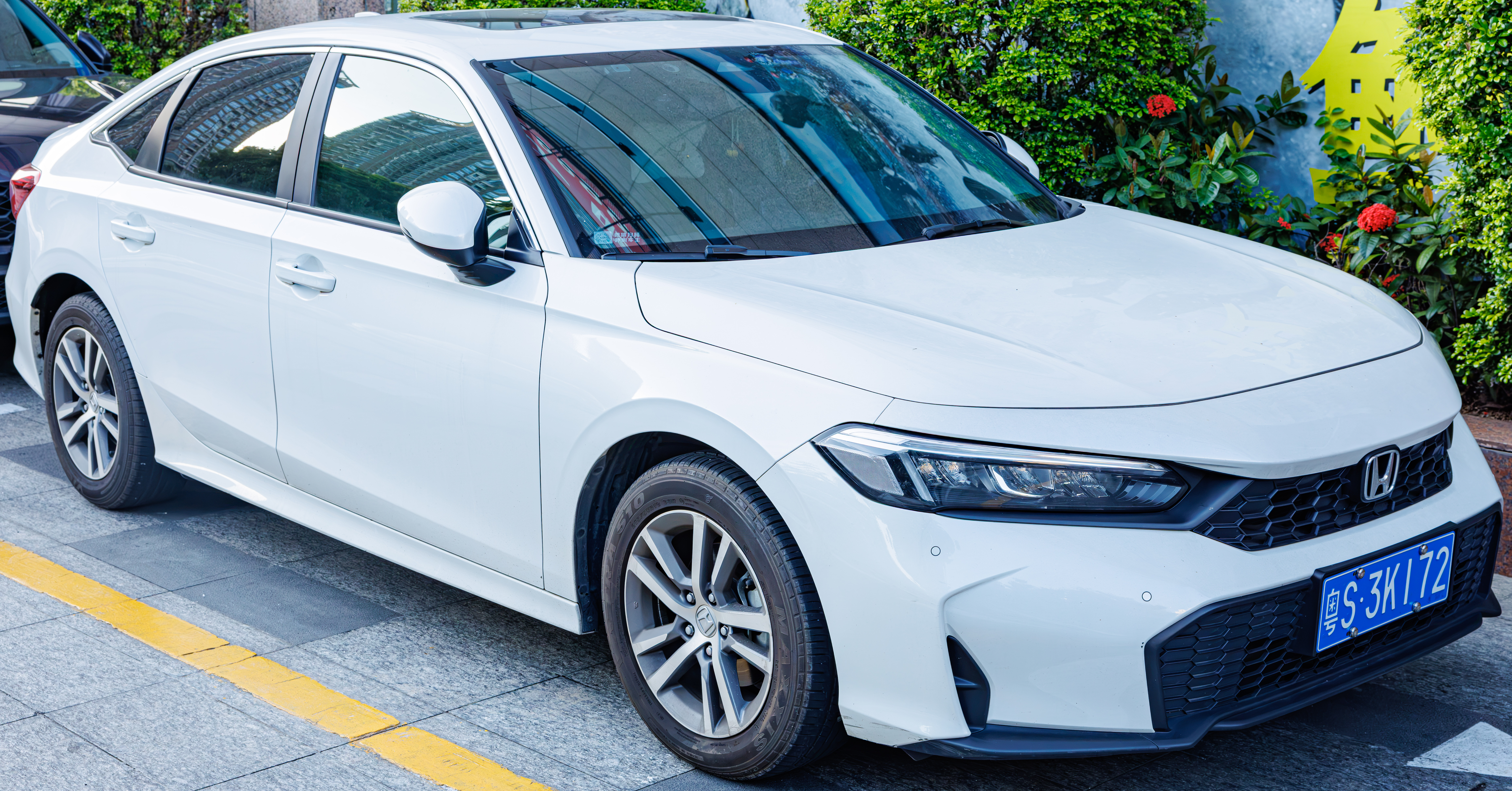
Honda Civic

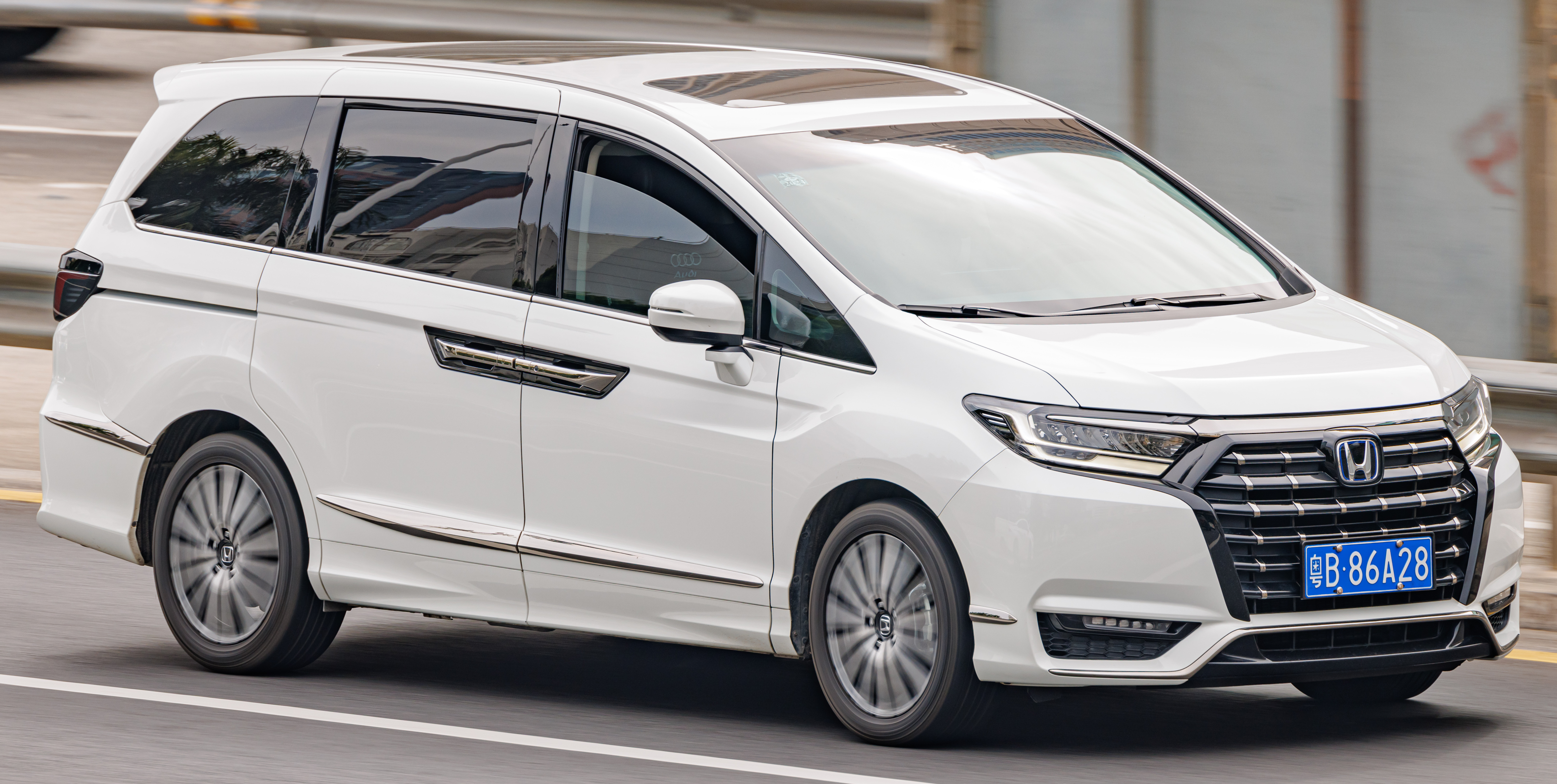
Honda Elysion

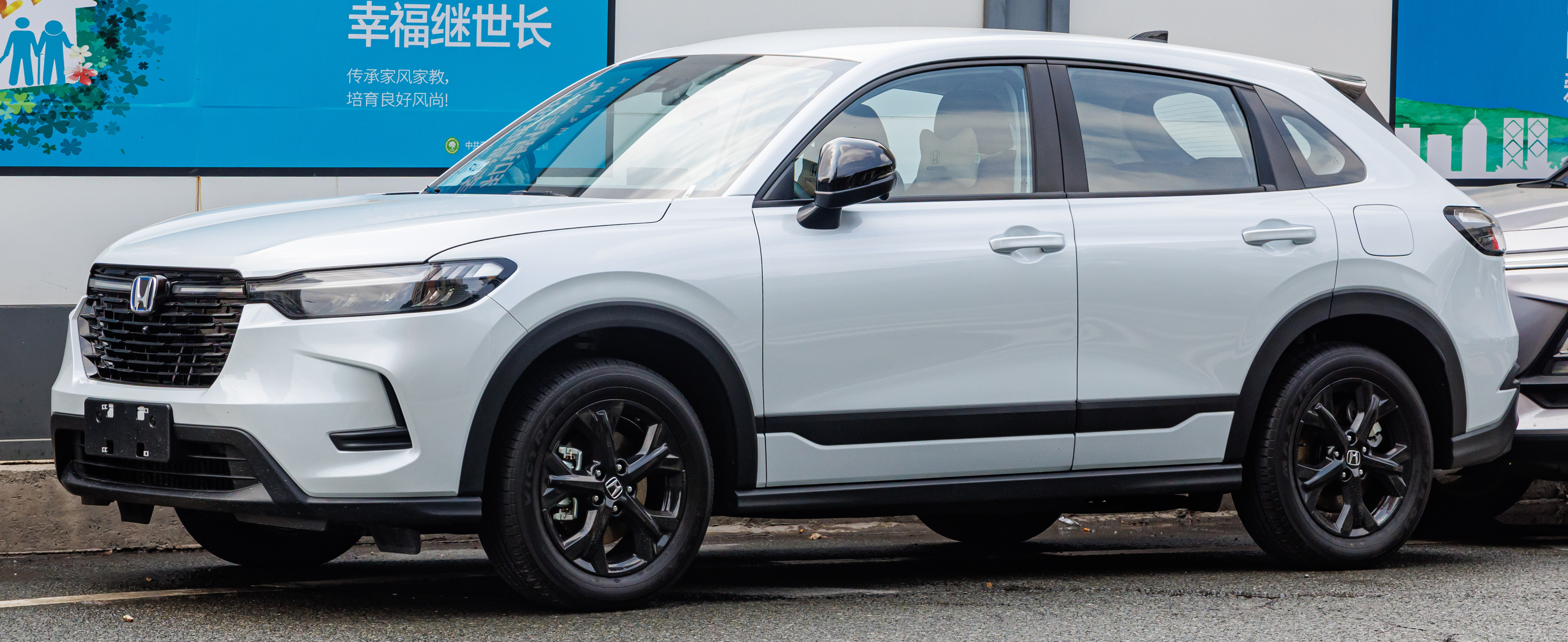
Honda HR-V

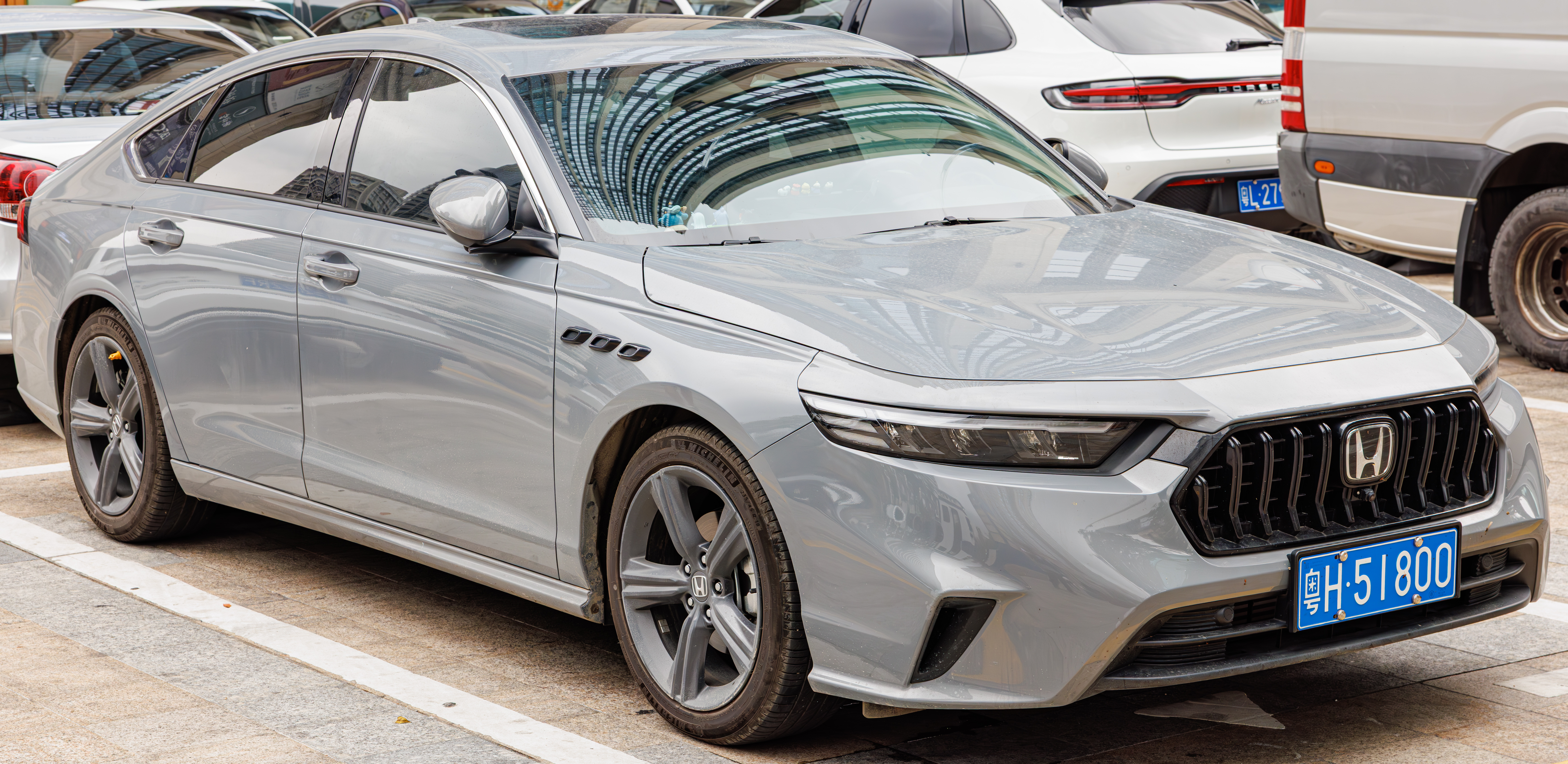
Honda Inspire

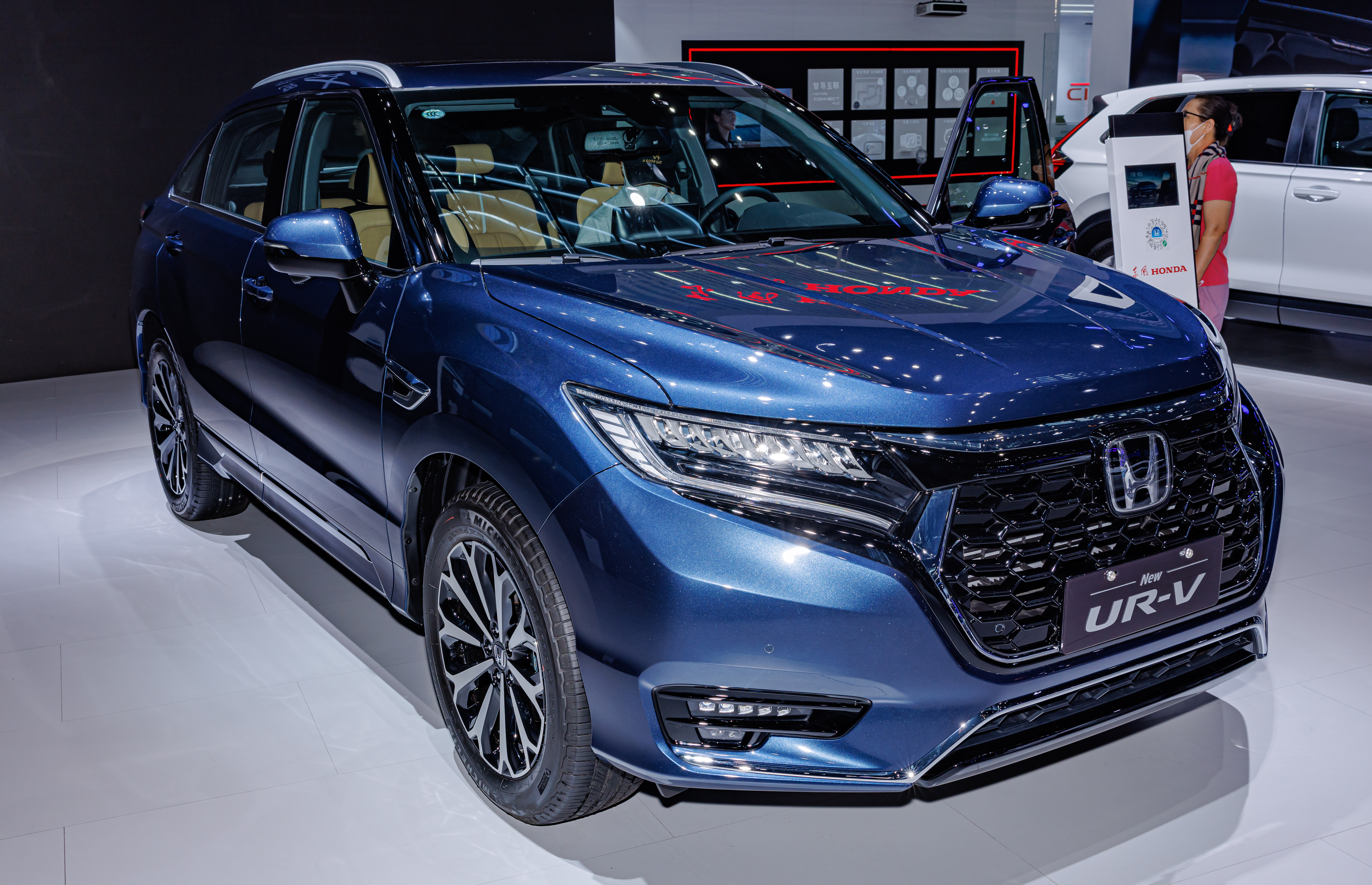
Honda UR-V

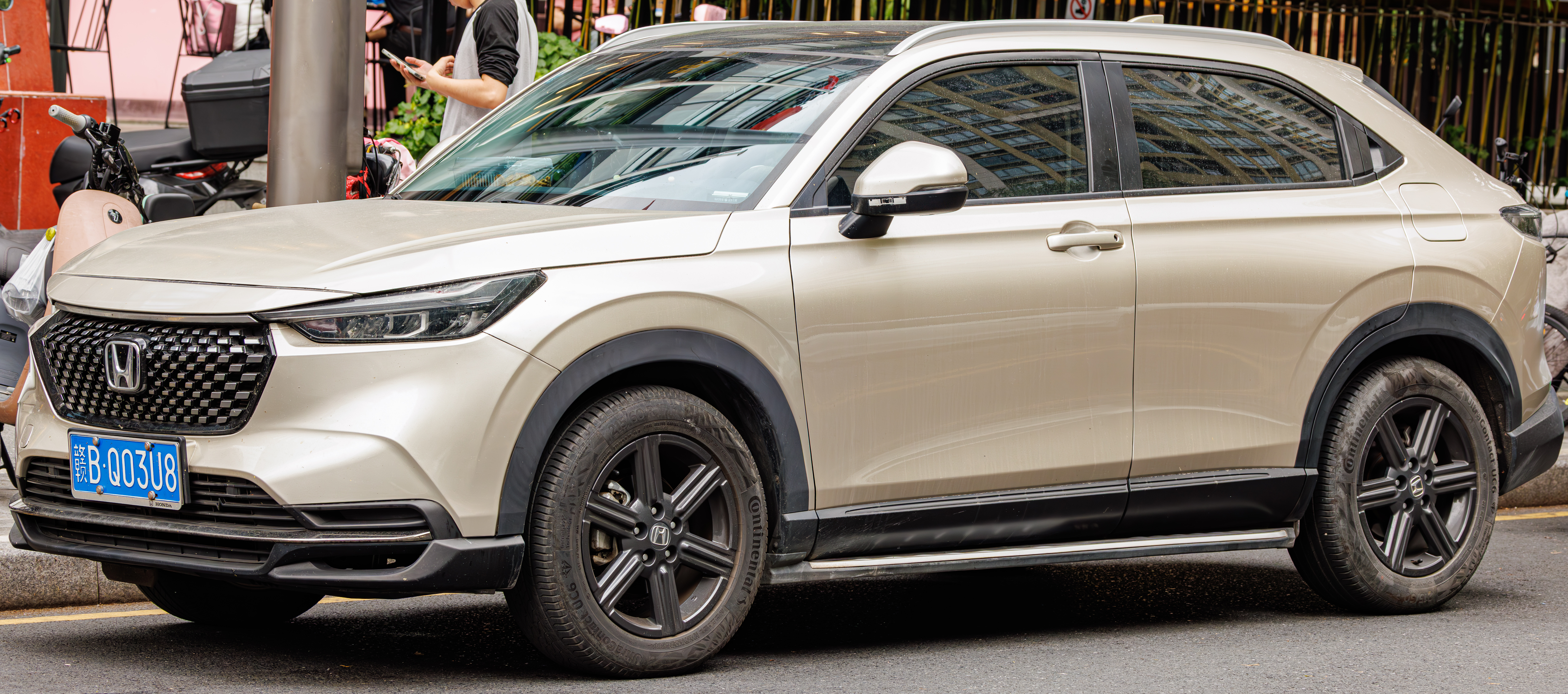
Honda XR-V

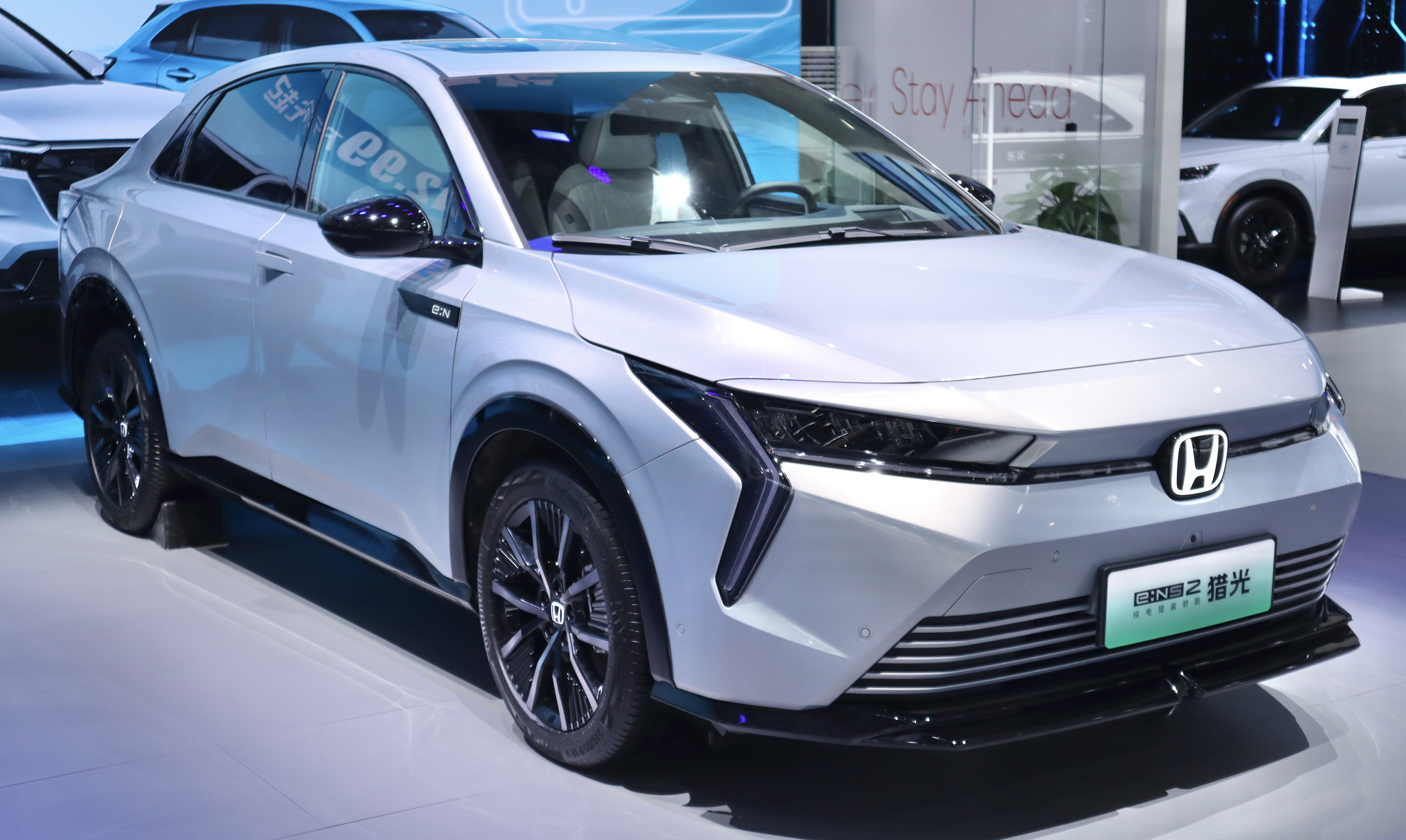
Honda e:NS2

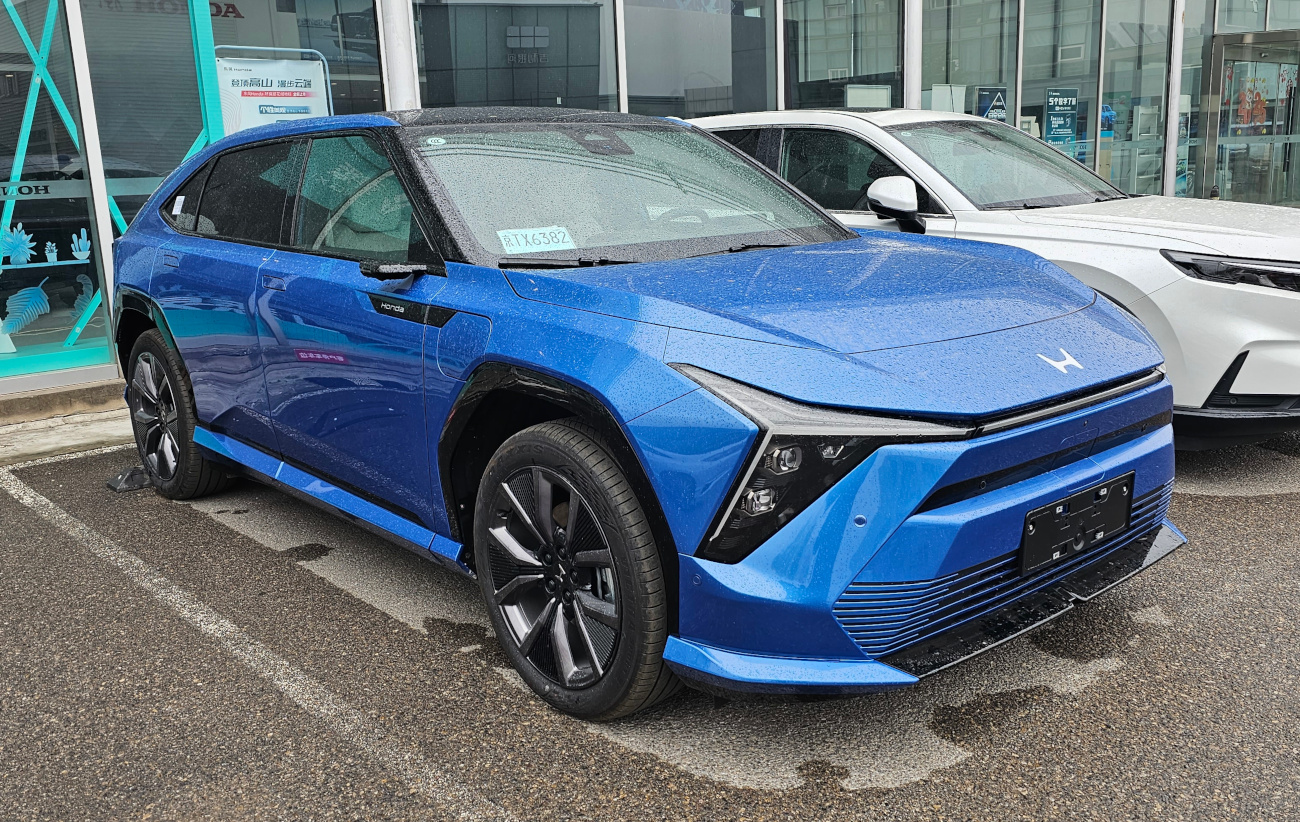
Honda S7

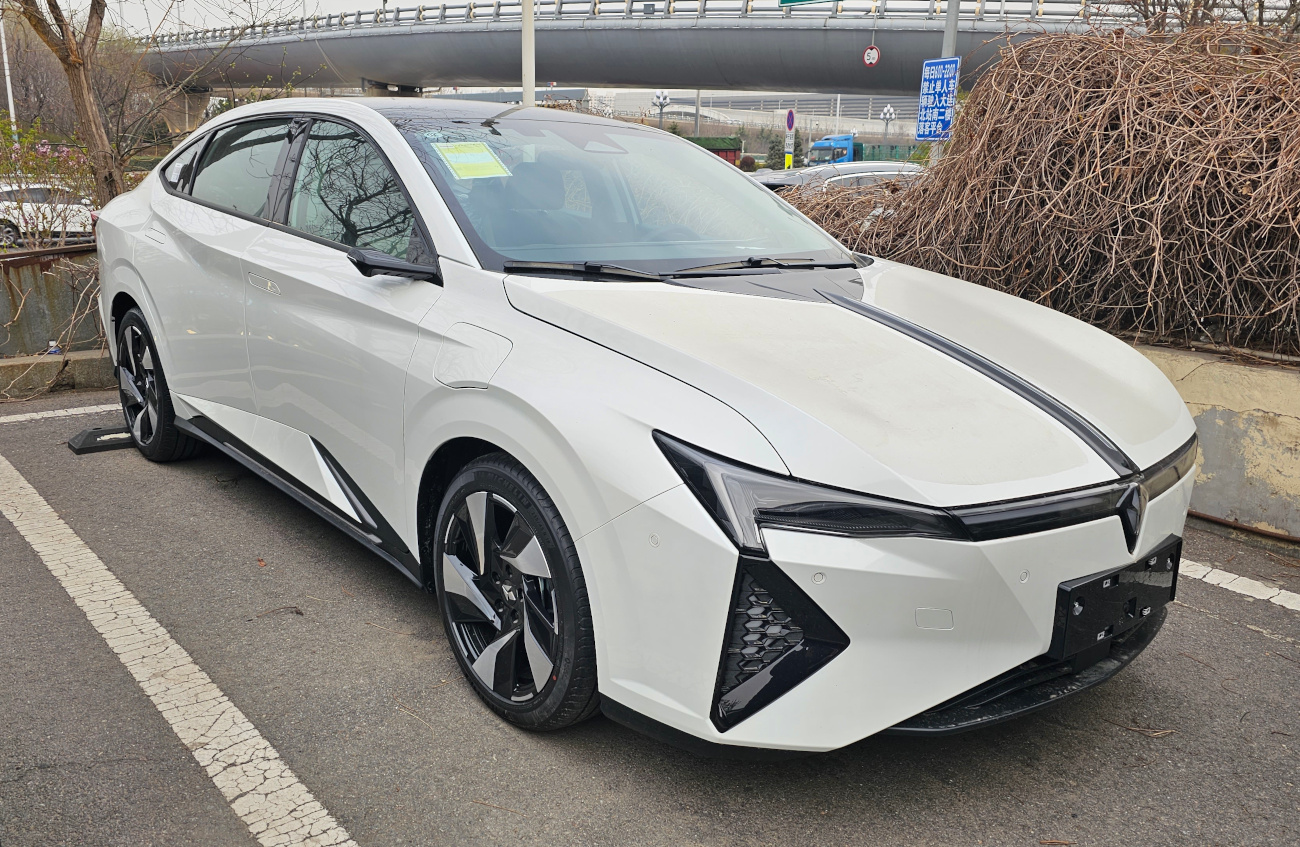
Lingxi L

=== Former ===
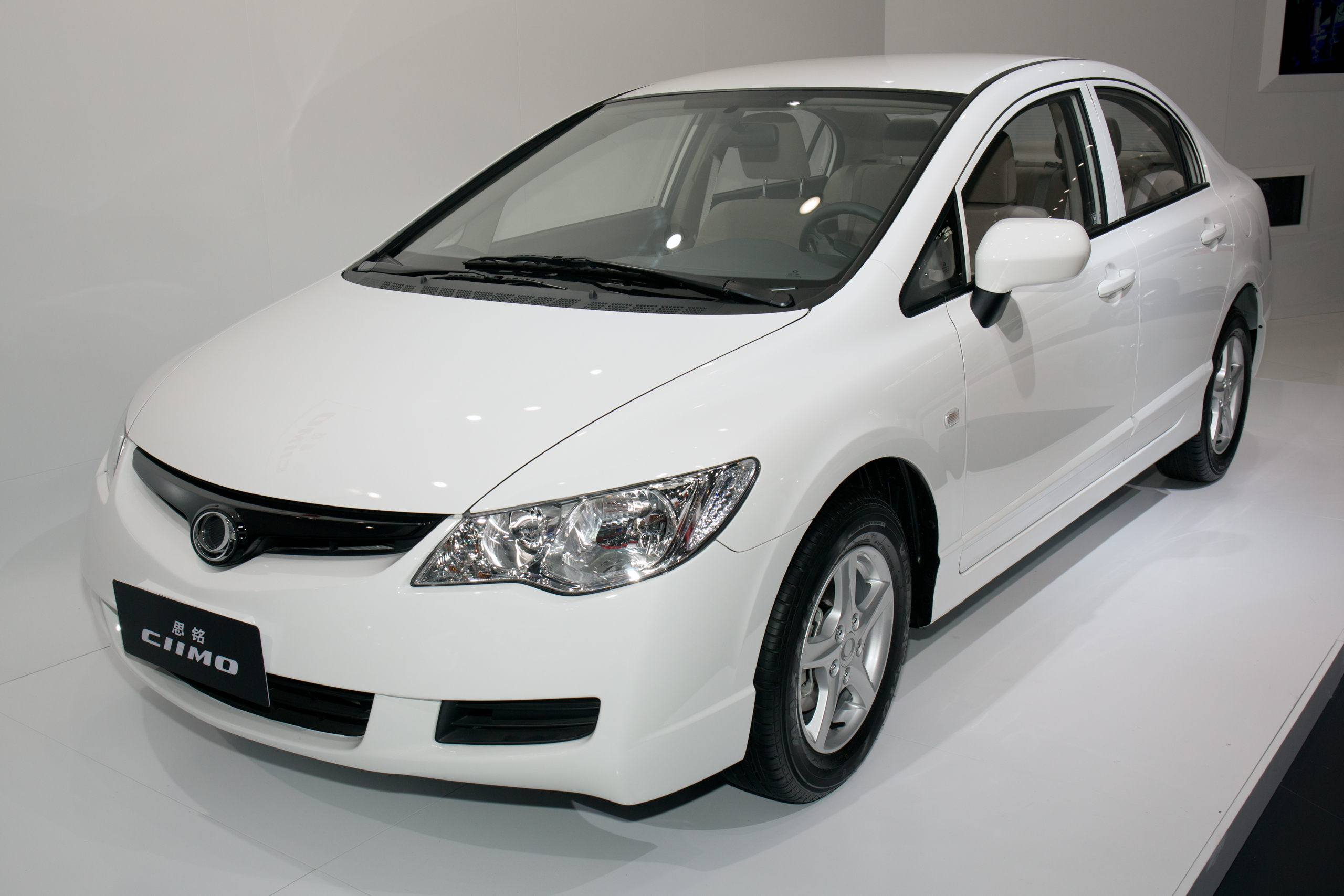
Ciimo 1.8

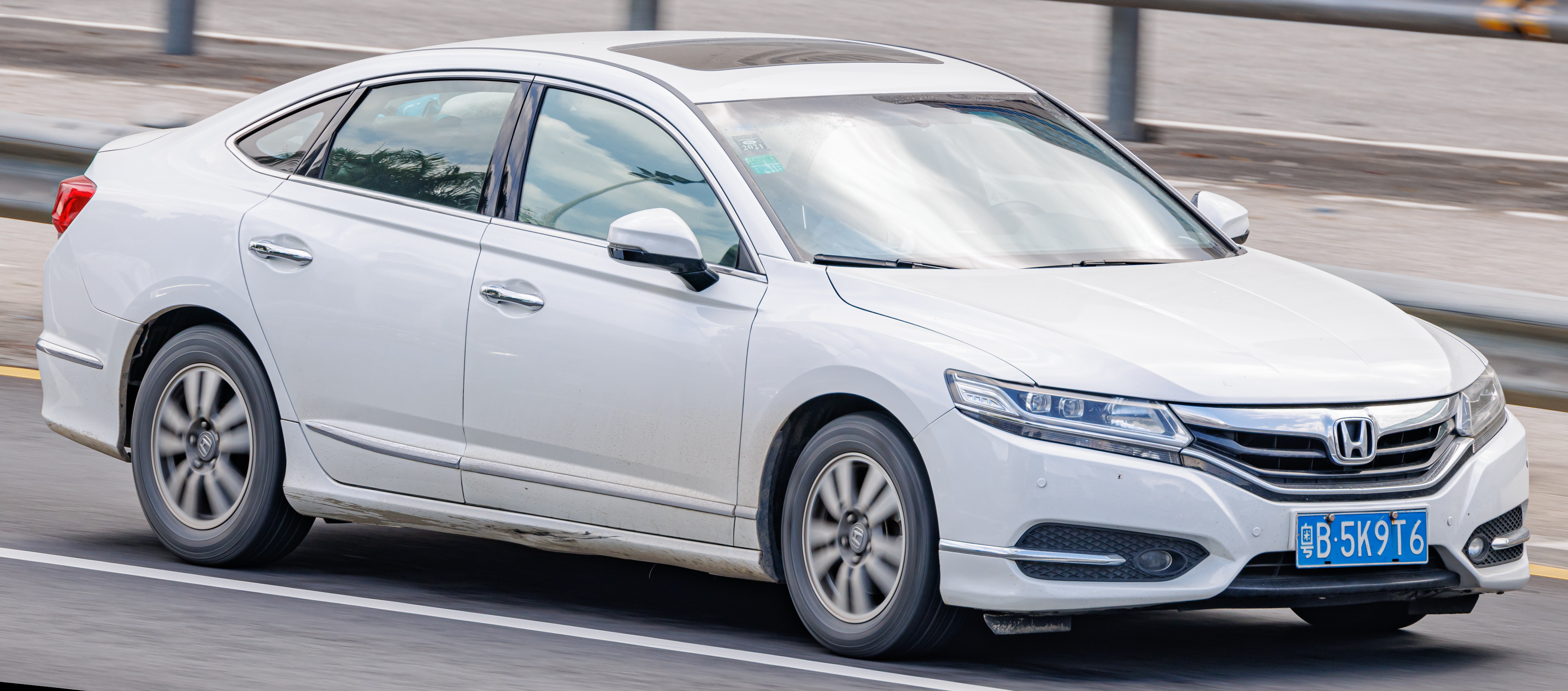
Honda Spirior

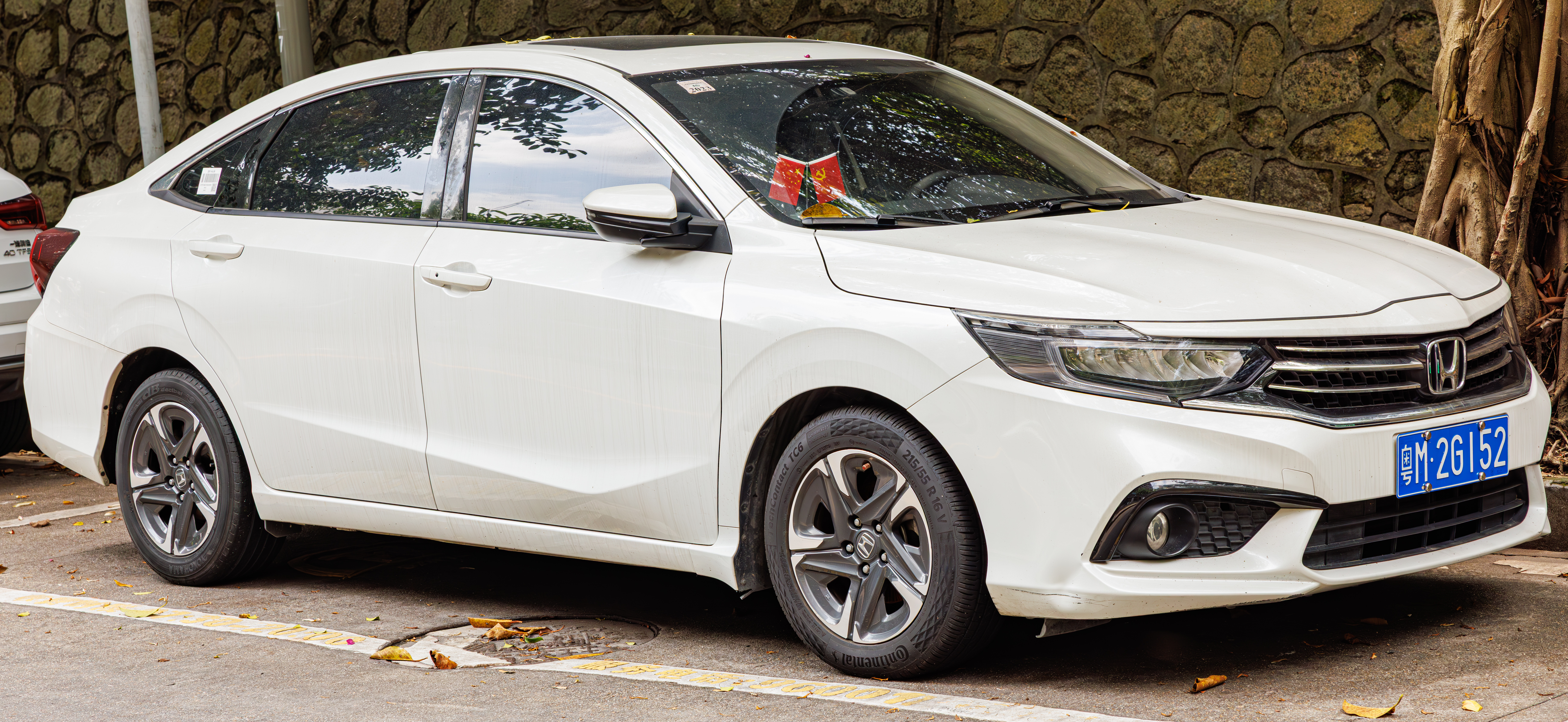
Honda Envix

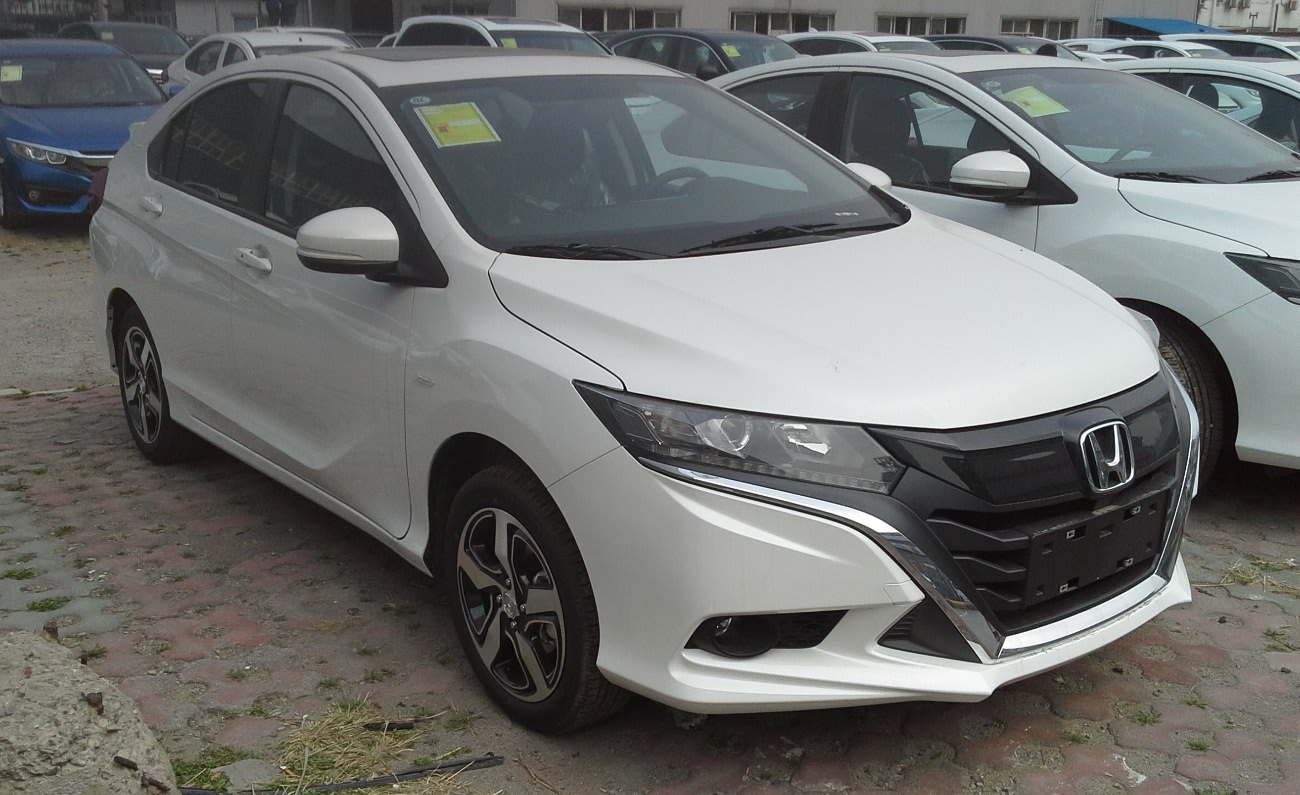
Honda Gienia

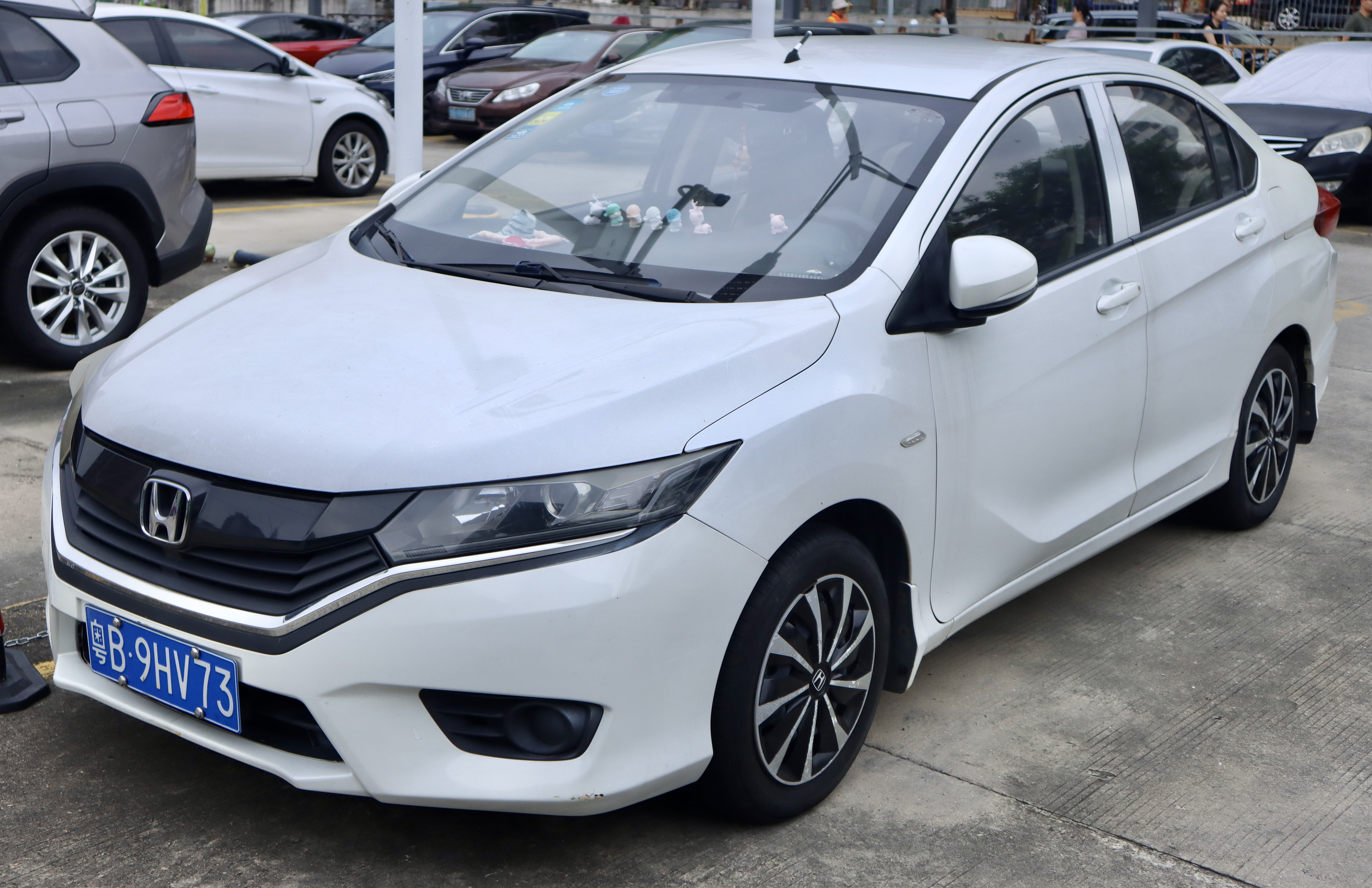
Honda Greiz

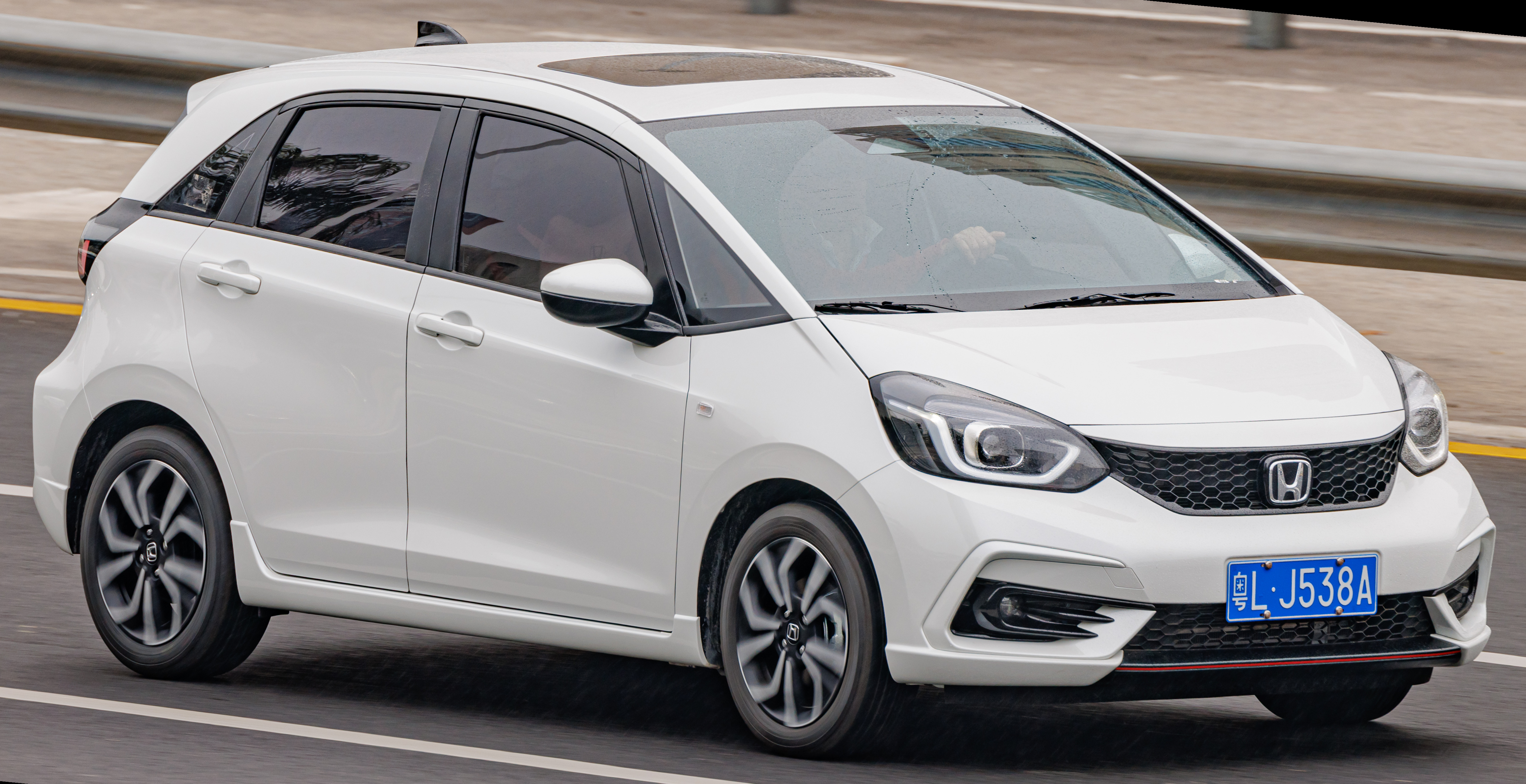
Honda Life

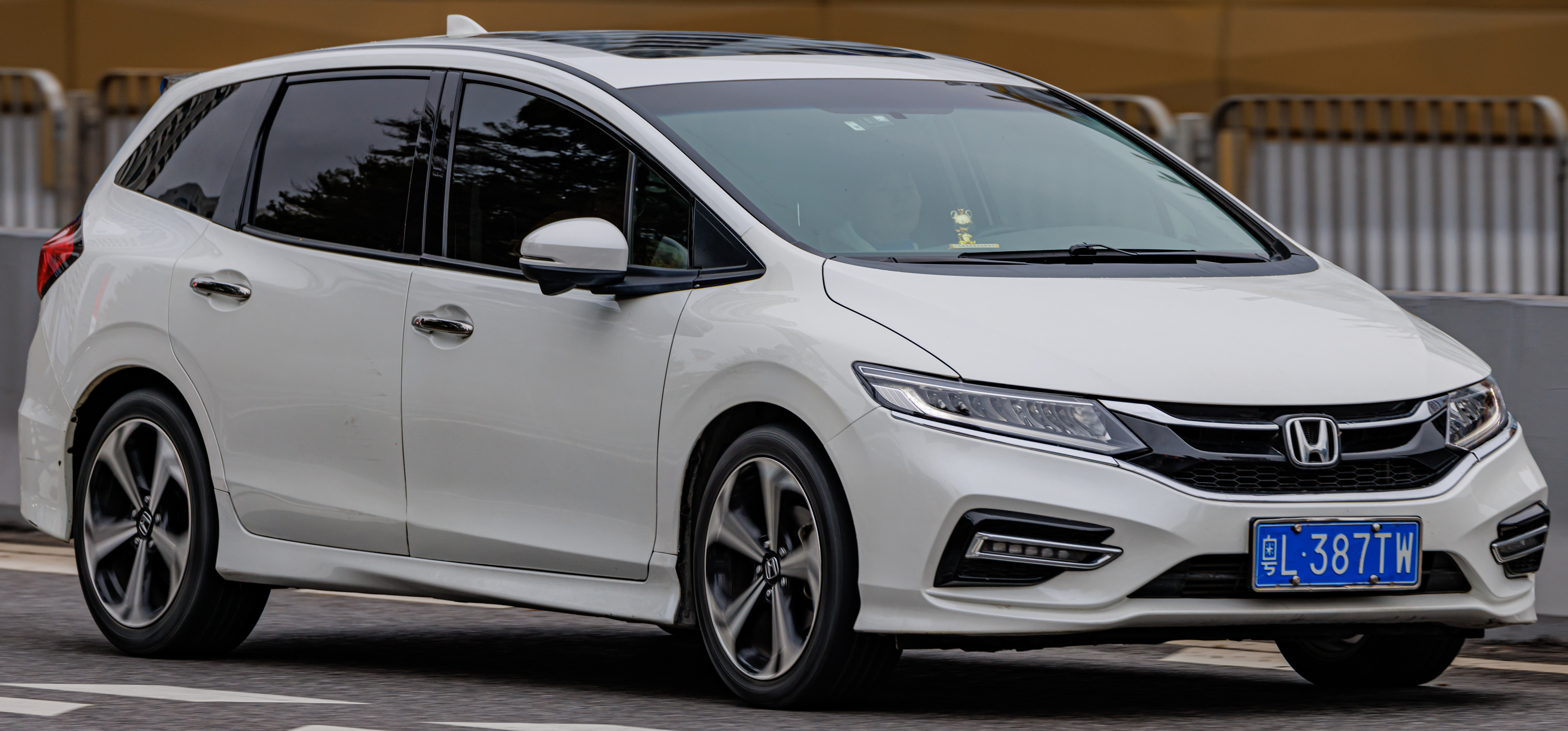
Honda Jade

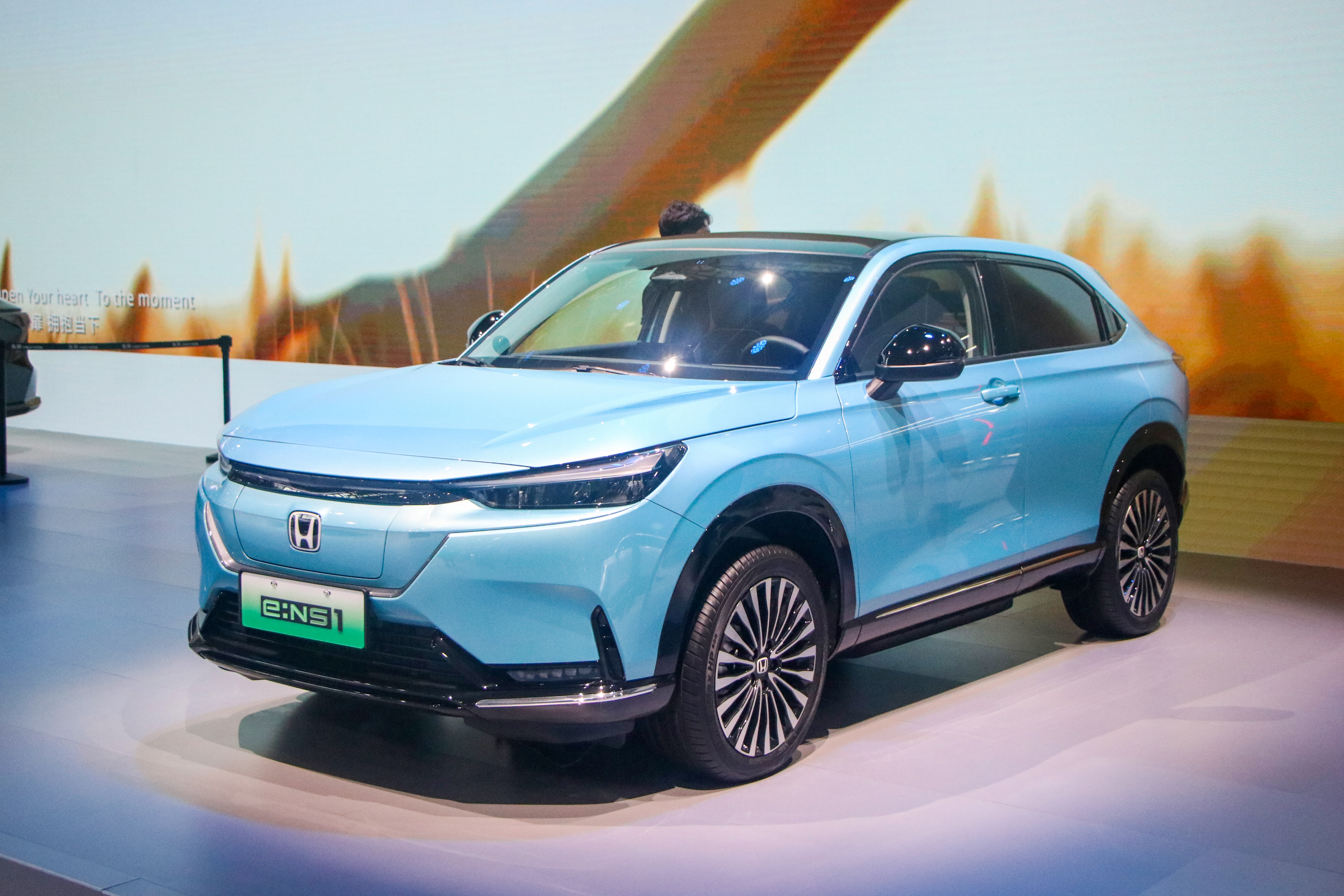
Honda e:NS1

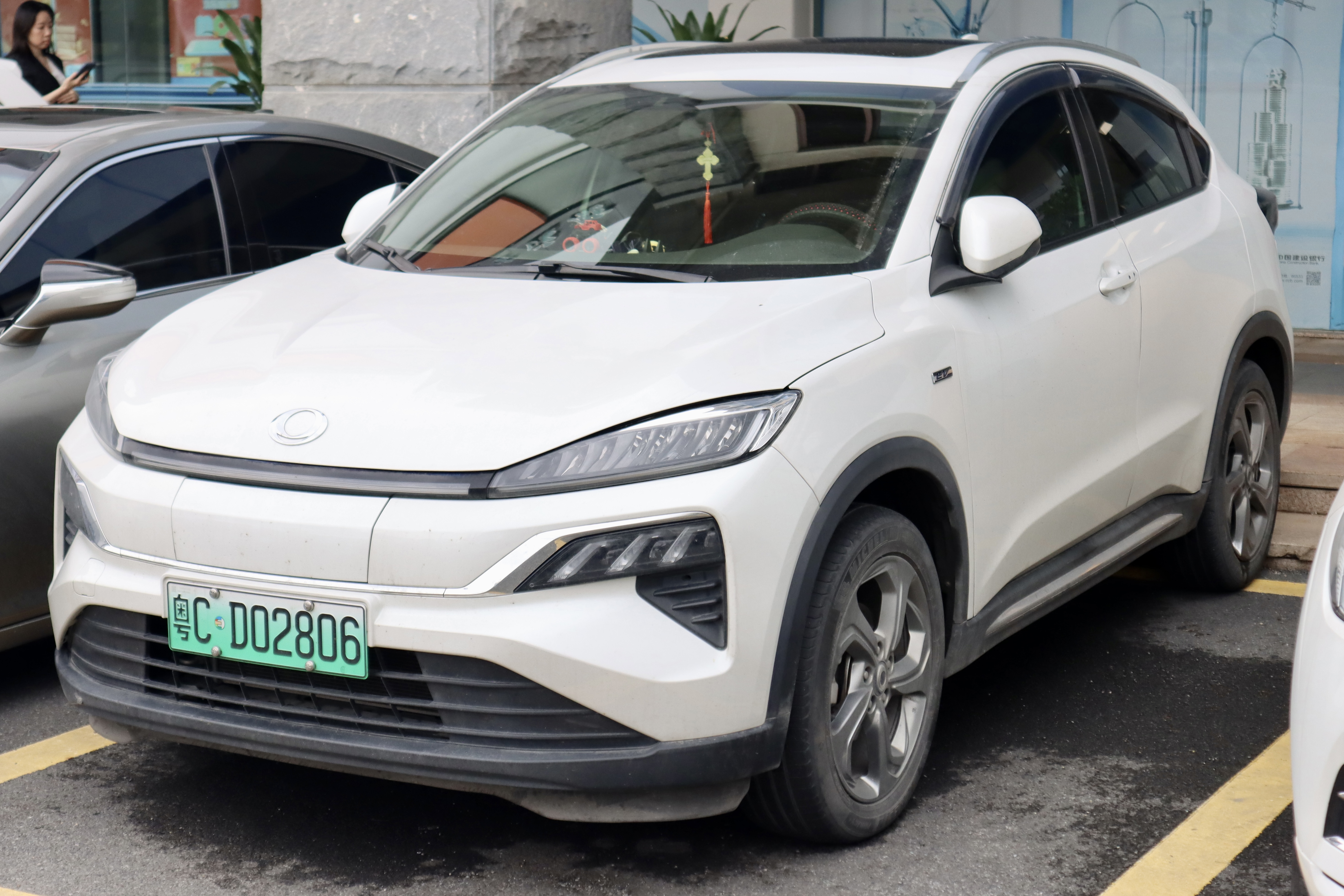
Ciimo M-NV

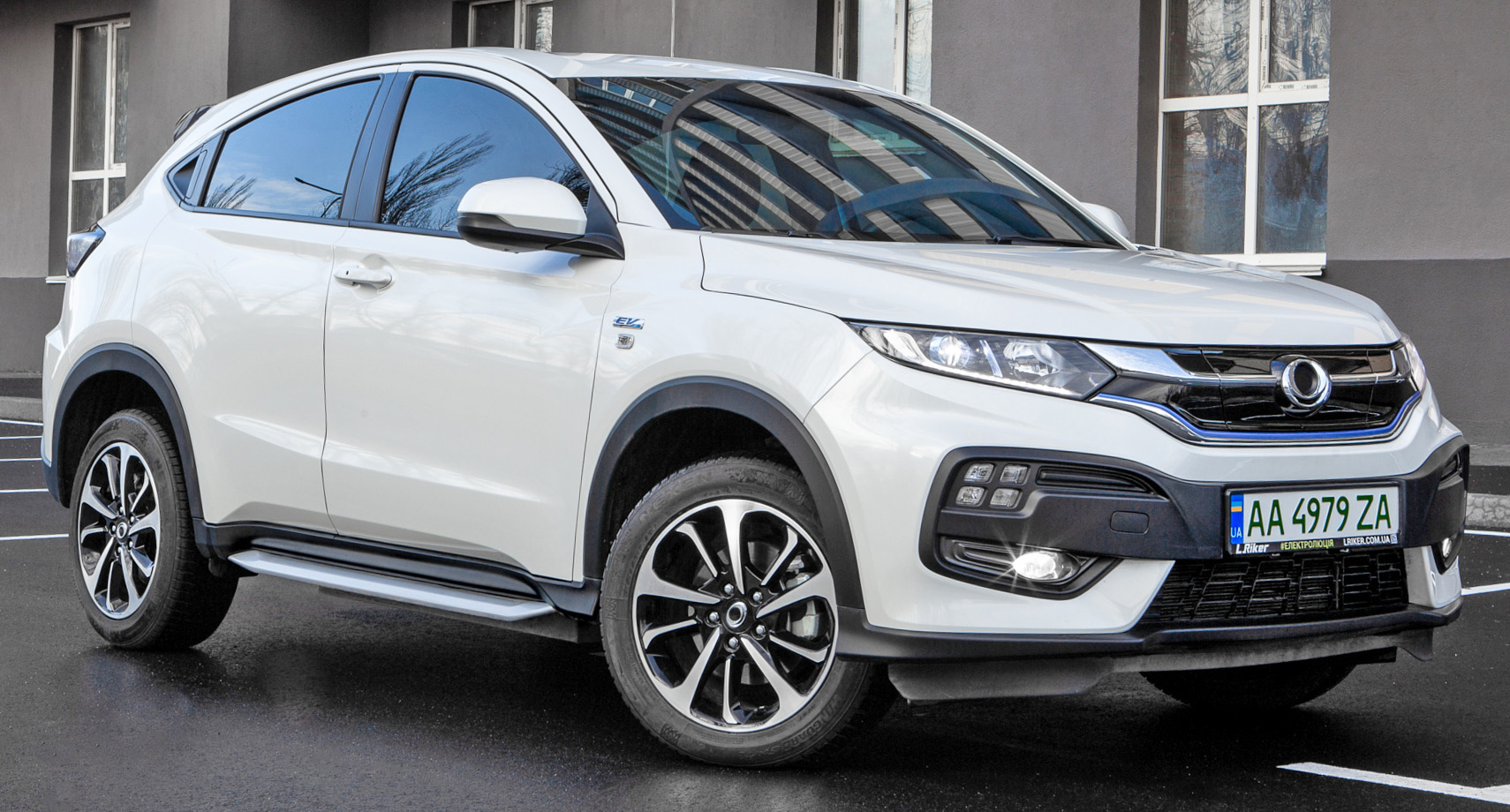
Ciimo X-NV

== See also ==
- List of Honda assembly plants
- GAC Honda
