= Lingxi (marque) =

Car brand

- Current owner: Dongfeng Honda
- Introduced: 2023
- Markets: China

Lingxi is an electric car marque created by the Chinese/Japanese Dongfeng Honda joint venture. It was launched in September 2023 at the Guangzhou Auto Show with the L concept car.

== Lingxi L ==
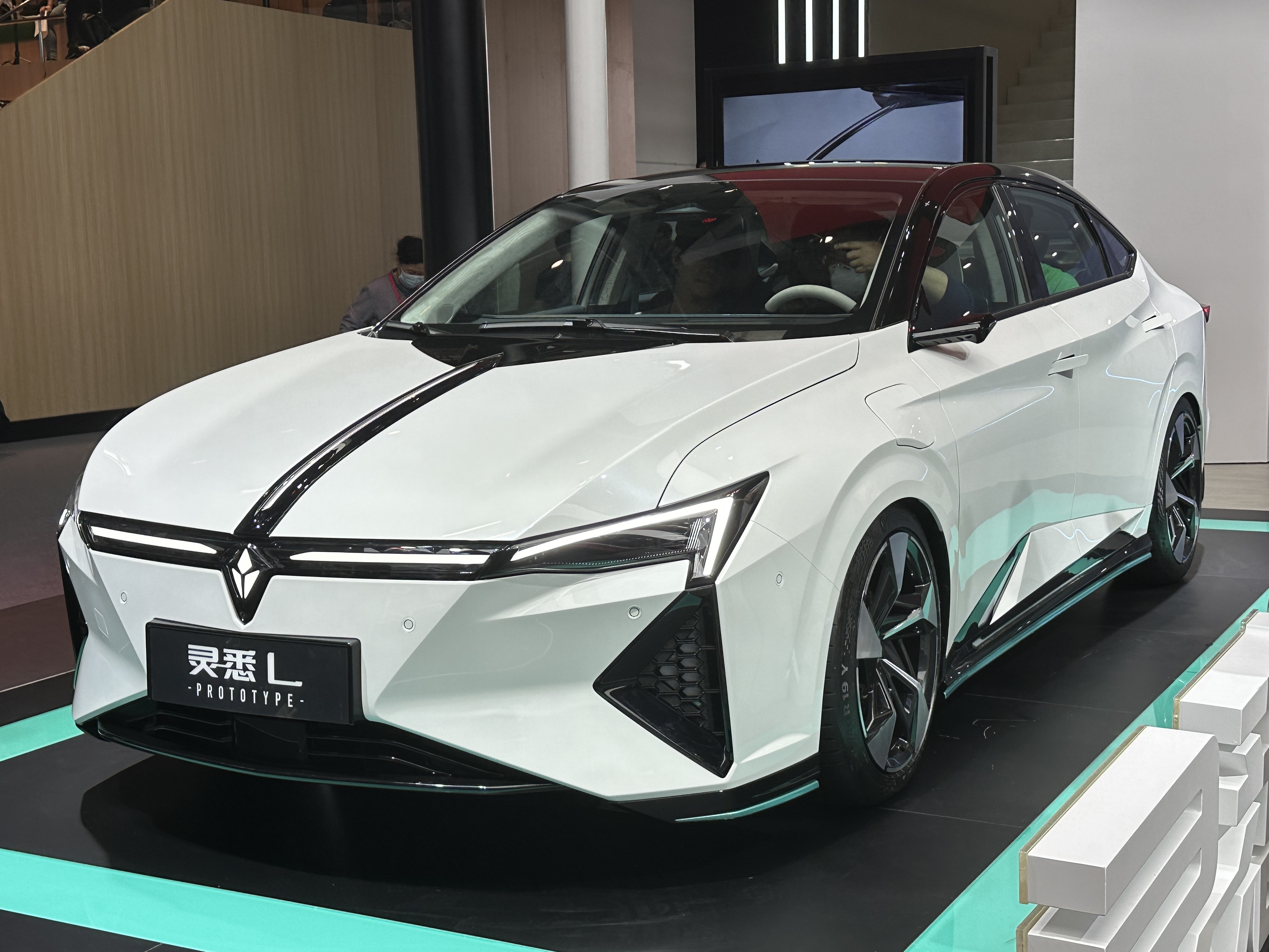
Lingxi L prototype at Beijing Auto Show 2024

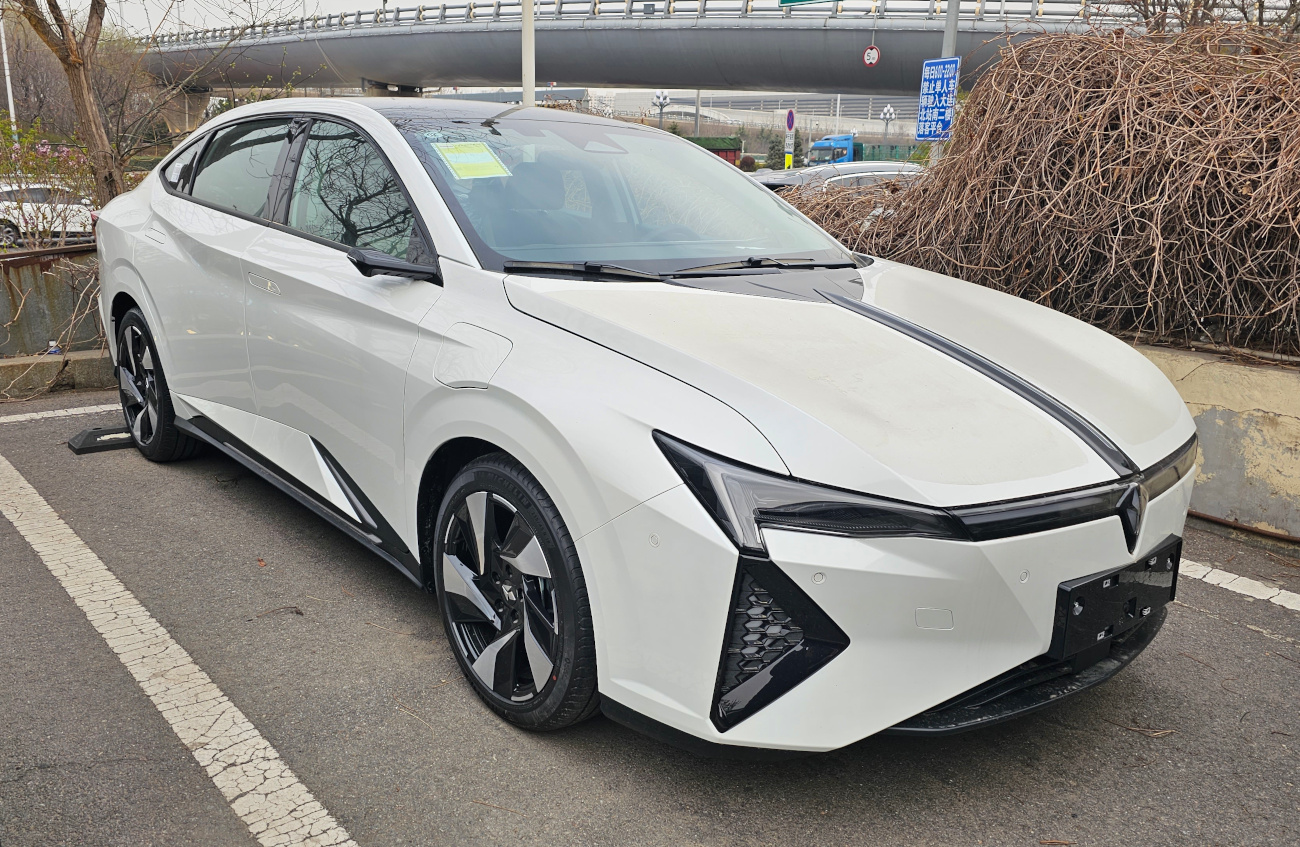
Lingxi L

The marque was launched in September 2023 with a concept car, the Lingxi L, which was subsequently shown as a near-production prototype at the April 2024 Beijing Auto Show and was formally launched for sales in September 2024.

The L is 4,830 mm (190.2 in) long and sits on a relatively short wheelbase of 2,731 mm (107.5 in). The interior features five digital screens, two of which are used for the standard rear view cameras which are standard.

The battery is a 59 kW·h lithium iron phosphate pack driving a single from motor with 160 kW (218 PS; 215 bhp) and a top speed of 160 km/h (99.4 mph).
