= Everus S1 =

Chinese automobile

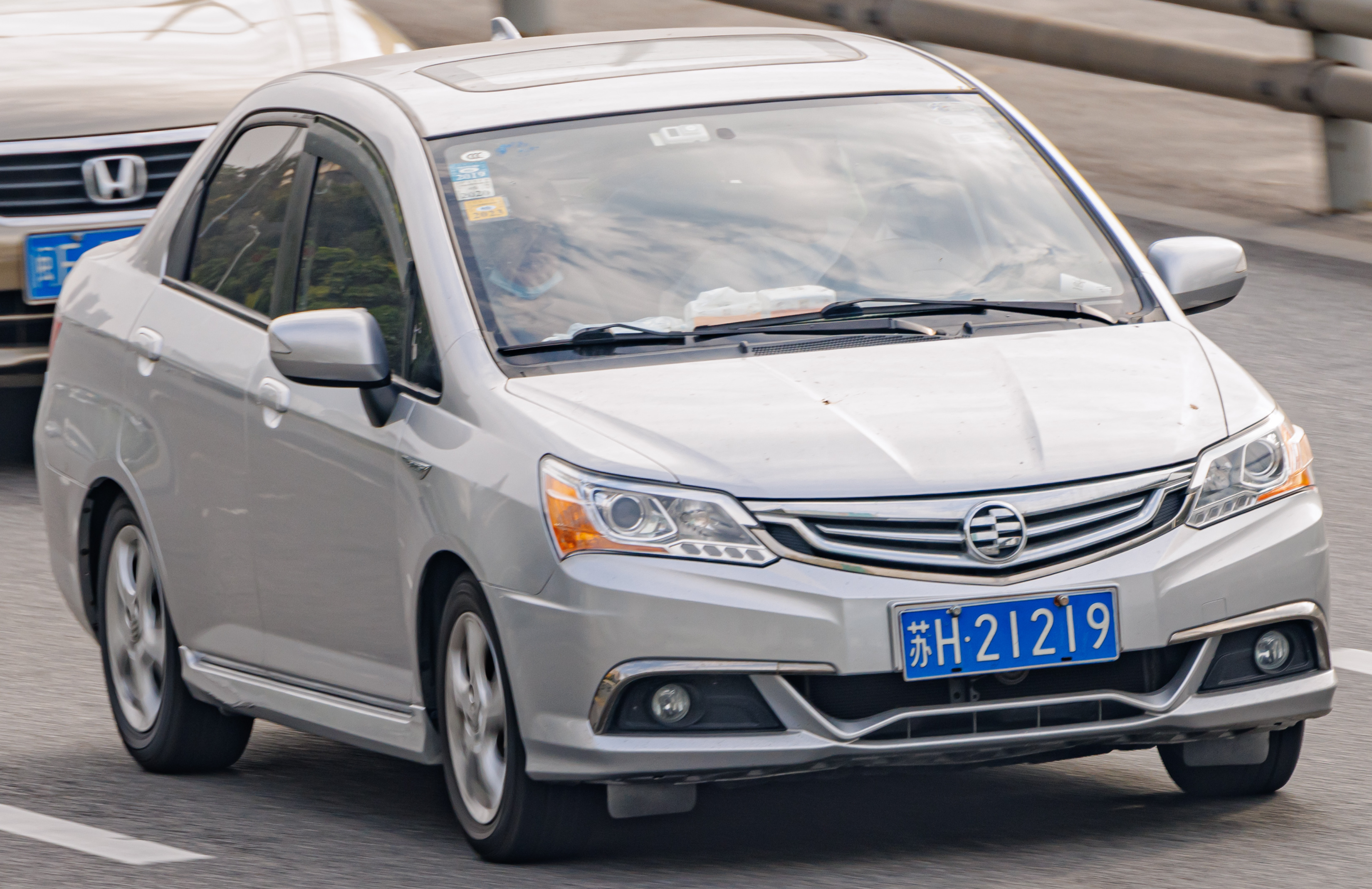
- 2013–2014 Everus S1 (facelift)

Overview
- Manufacturer: Everus (Honda)
- Production: 2011–2014
- Assembly: China: Huangpu, Guangzhou (Guangqi Honda)

Body and chassis
- Class: Subcompact car (B)
- Body style: 4-door sedan
- Layout: Front-engine, front-wheel-drive layout
- Related: Honda City (fourth generation)

Powertrain
- Engine: 1.3 L I4; 1.5 L L15A1 I4
- Transmission: 5-speed manual 5-speed automatic

Dimensions
- Wheelbase: 2,450 mm (96 in)
- Length: 4,420 mm (174 in) (2011–2012); 4,460 mm (176 in) (2013–2014)
- Width: 1,690 mm (67 in)
- Height: 1,495 mm (58.9 in) (2011–2012, 2014); 1,505 mm (59.3 in) (2013)

The Everus S1 is a subcompact sedan by Everus, and also the first car of the Everus brand available for sale.

== Overview ==
Debuted as a concept during the 2010 Guangzhou Auto Show, the Everus S1 is a badge-engineered fourth-generation Honda City/Jazz saloon and as the production version debuted during the 2011 Shanghai Auto Show, the Everus S1 also went on sale in April 2011. It is 4,420mm long and is available with a 1.3 L i-DSi or 1.5 L VTEC L-series petrol engine. It is paired with a 5-speed manual or a 5-speed automatic. Initial planning for the price was 20% lower than the price of the Honda City at the time, which is from 69,800 yuan to 99,800 yuan.

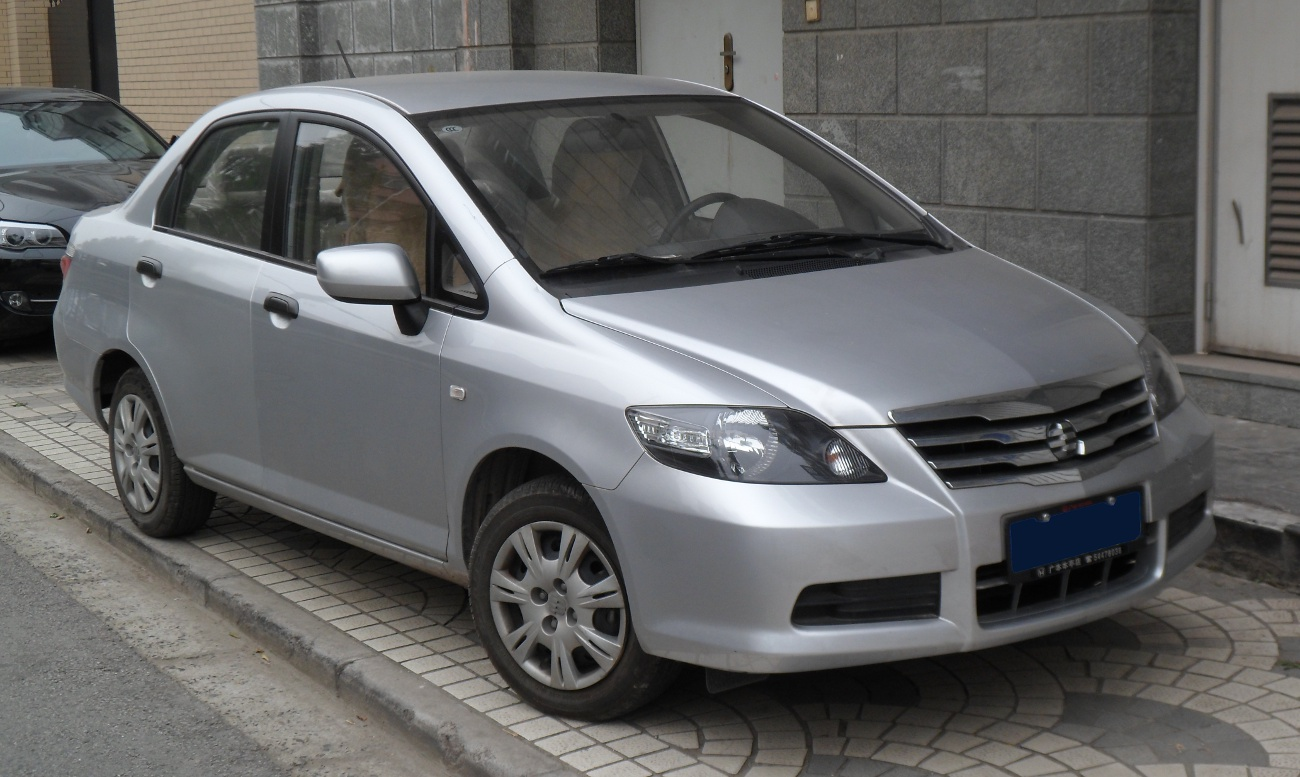
2011–2012 Everus S1 front (pre-facelift)

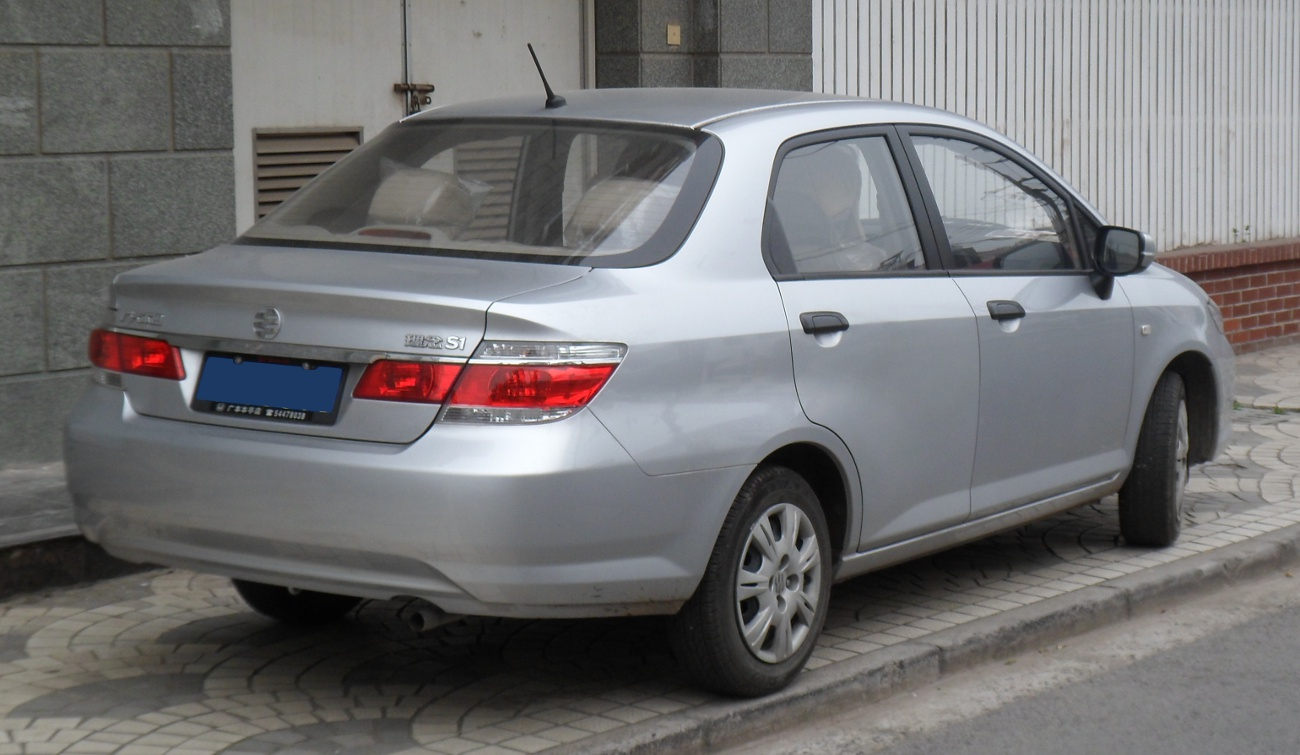
2011–2012 Everus S1 rear (pre-facelift)

A facelift was revealed in 2013 during the Shanghai Auto Show, and sales of the facelifted model started in May 2013. It then concluded production in 2014 selling around 4,500 units. With the Everus, Honda became the first foreign automaker to develop vehicles under a brand owned by its local joint venture automaker in China.

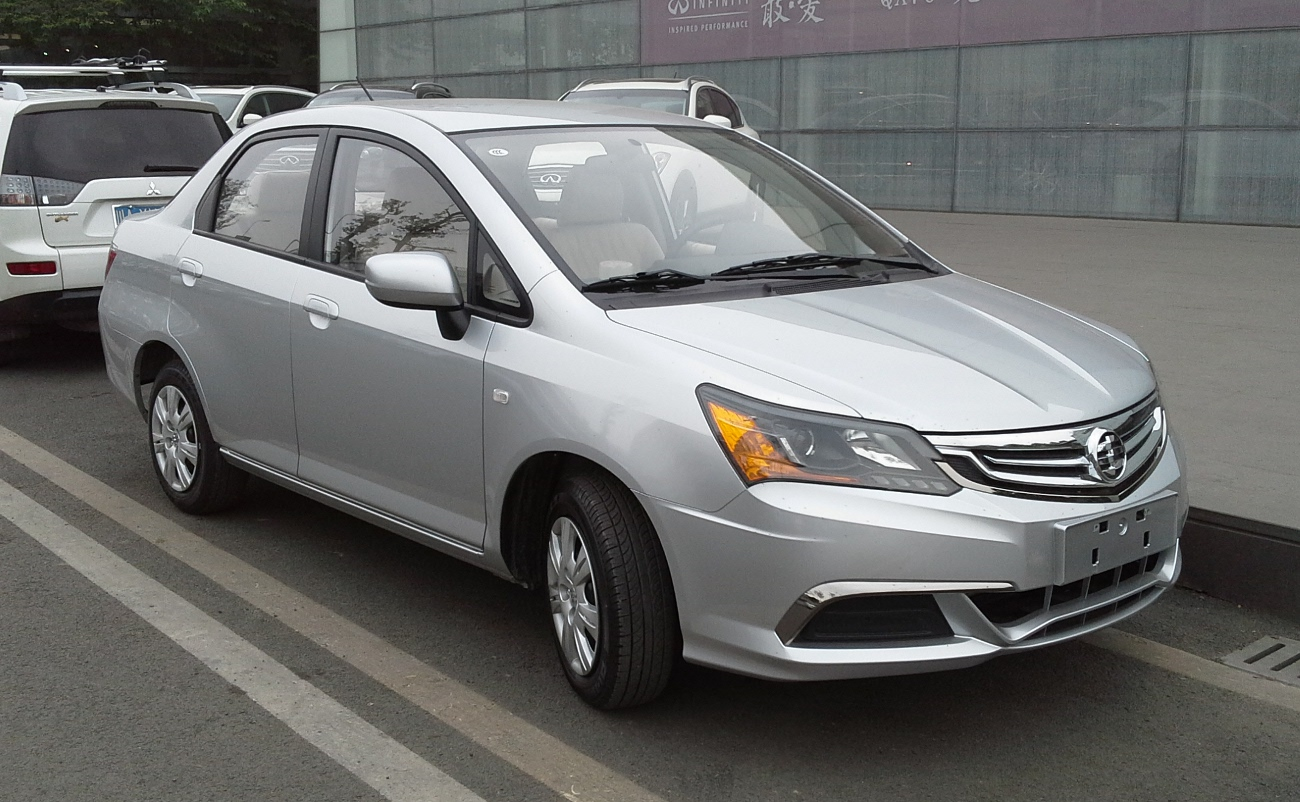
2013–2014 Everus S1 front (facelift)

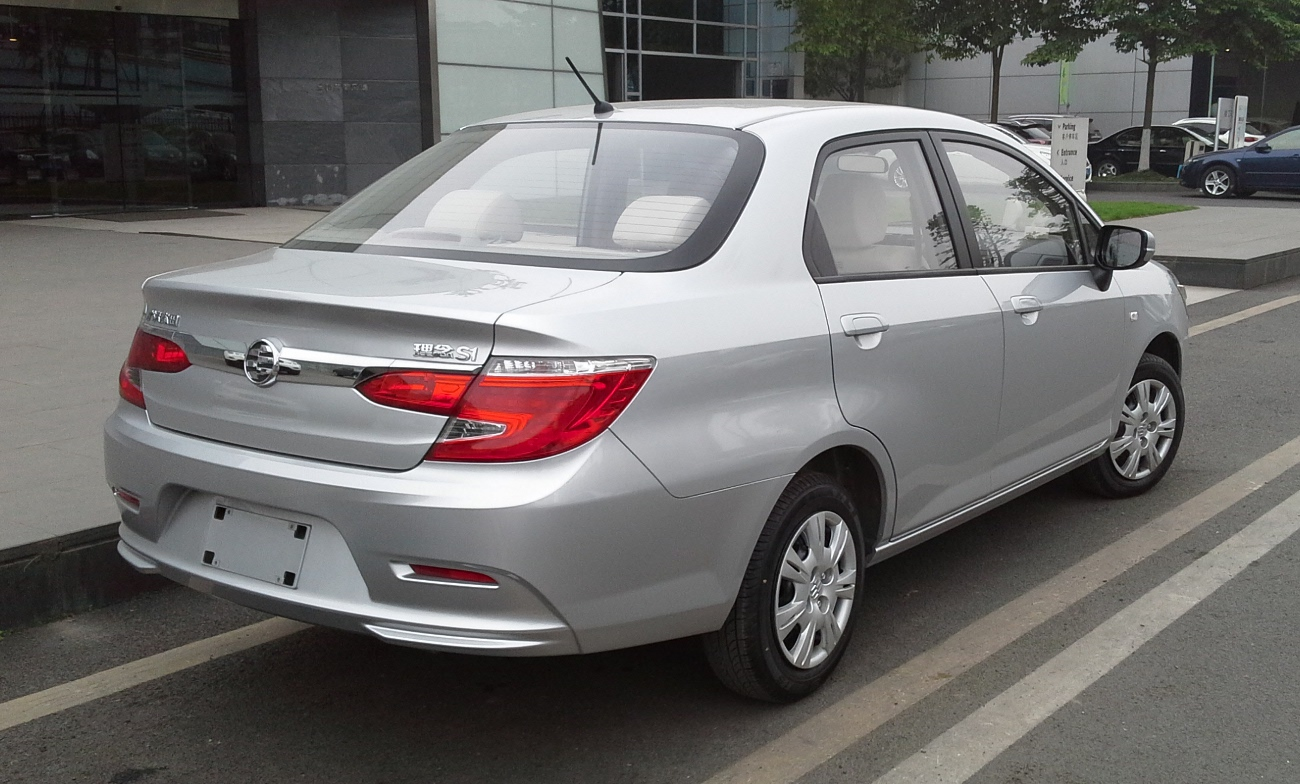
2013–2014 Everus S1 rear (facelift)
