= GAC Honda =

Chinese automobile manufacturing joint venture company

GAC Honda Automobile Co., Ltd.

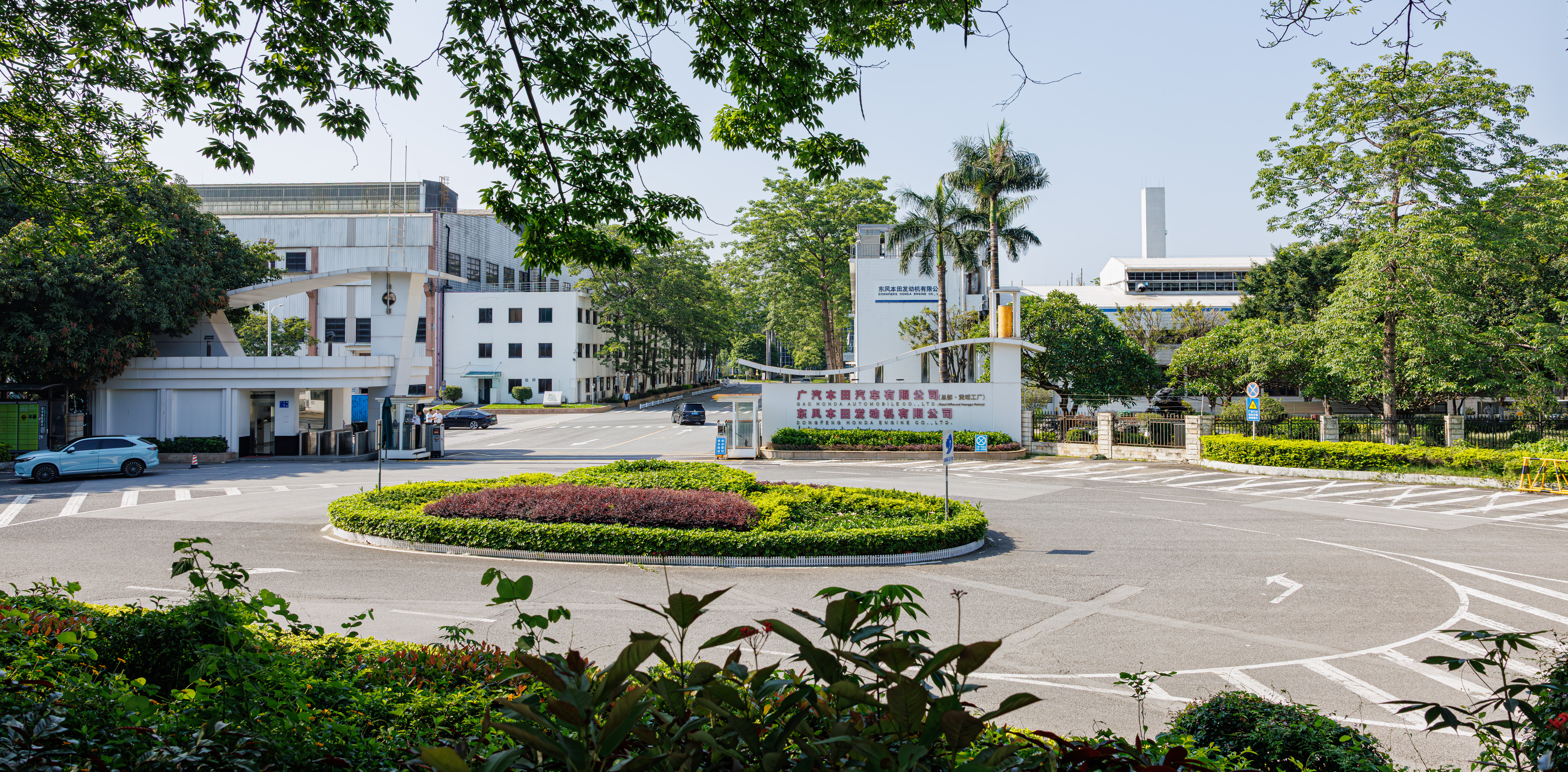
- Headquarters and manufacturing facility in Huangpu, Guangzhou
- Type: Joint venture
- Industry: Automotive
- Founded: 7 May 1998; 28 years ago
- Headquarters: Guangzhou, China
- Area served: China
- Key people: Yasuhide Mizuno (General Manager)
- Products: Automobiles
- Owners: GAC Group (50%); Honda Motor Co., Ltd. (50%)
- Number of employees: Approximately 7,000
- Subsidiaries: Guangzhou Honda Automobile Research & Development Co., Ltd. Guangzhou Honda Research & Development Co., Ltd
- Website: www.ghac.cn

GAC Honda
- Traditional Chinese: 廣汽本田
- Simplified Chinese: 广汽本田
Transcriptions
Standard Mandarin
- Hanyu Pinyin: Guǎng qì Běntián

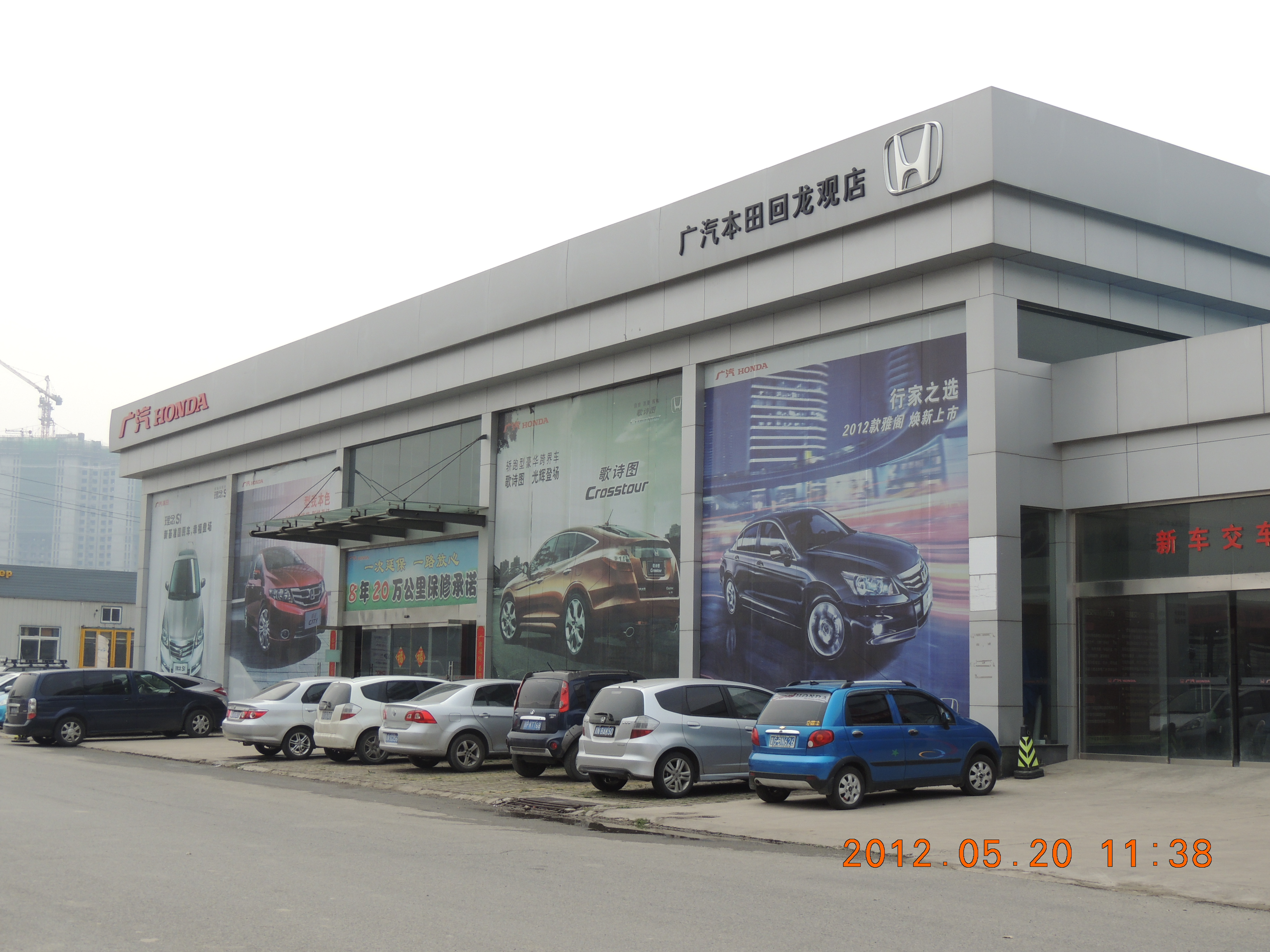
Guangqi Honda dealership in Beijing, China

GAC Honda Automobile Co., Ltd. is a Chinese automobile manufacturing joint venture company based in Guangzhou, Guangdong province.

Co-owned by Honda and GAC Group (Guangqi), GAC Honda operates two plants that, as of 2011, produces Honda-branded models and one car sold under the China-only Everus brand. GAC Honda's products incorporate Japanese-made parts. According to statistics from the China Association of Automobile Manufacturers, Guangqi Honda's car sales in 2005 were 203,200 units, ranking fifth in mainland China.

Originally named Guangzhou Honda, this was changed to GAC Honda in 2009. As of 2011, the company claims to have a per year production capacity of 480,000.

== History ==
Seeking to replace the loss-making of the Guangzhou Peugeot Automobile Company for a joint venture with another foreign car-maker, the government of Guangzhou established Guangzhou Honda Automobile Co Ltd with Honda, which beat out a number of rivals for the privilege, in May or July 1998. GAC Honda launched its first model, an American version Accord in March 1999 along with its first 4S shop.

Making a product that the Chinese consumer had familiarity with through high quality imports as well as a pre-existing sales and service network for these cars may have contributed to the early success of GAC Honda. A recently failed joint venture between the Guangzhou Government and Peugeot (Guangzhou Peugeot Automobile Company) also helped to prepare the ground.

Beginning in 2009, GAC Honda has distributed automobiles by ship—reducing secondary transport distances and transport losses while also being environmentally responsible. The company also uses rail and road transport.

Everus is another car brand of the company, launched in 2011. Soon after, the company has a production capacity of 480,000 vehicles.

From 2016 to 2022, Acura will also be produced. On April 1, 2020, Honda Automobile (China) was acquired.

== Everus ==
Everus (Li Nian Chinese: 理念), GAC Honda's first China-only brand, is targeted at consumers in inland cities like Chaozhou and Lanzhou who can't afford its Honda-branded vehicles but desire the cachet and technological underpinnings foreign-tied brands offer. While it was the first China-only brand for any sino-foreign joint venture other, similar marques do exist such as the Dongfeng/Nissan Venucia.

The first Everus model, the S1 subcompact, was unveiled at the 2010 Guangzhou Auto Show. The S1 is based on an old model of the Honda City.

== Customer service award ==
GAC Honda ranked highest in customer satisfaction with authorized dealer after-sales service according to the J.D. Power Asia Pacific 2009 China Customer Service Index Study.

== Products ==
=== Honda ===
- Accord (2006–present)
- Avancier (2016–present)
- Breeze (2019–present)
- Integra (2022–present)
- Odyssey (2004–present)
- Vezel (2014–present)
- P7 (2025–present)
- GT

== Former products ==
=== Everus ===
- EA6 (2019–2024)
- VE-1 (2019–2024)
- S1 (2010–2013)

=== Honda ===
- Crosstour (2010–2015)
- City (2004–2019)
- Crider (2013–2025)
- Fit (2004–2026)
- ZR-V (2022–2026)
- e:NP1 (2022–2025)
- e:NP2 (2024–2026)

=== Acura ===
- CDX (2016–2022)
- RDX (2019–2022)
- TLX-L (2014–2020)

== Gallery ==
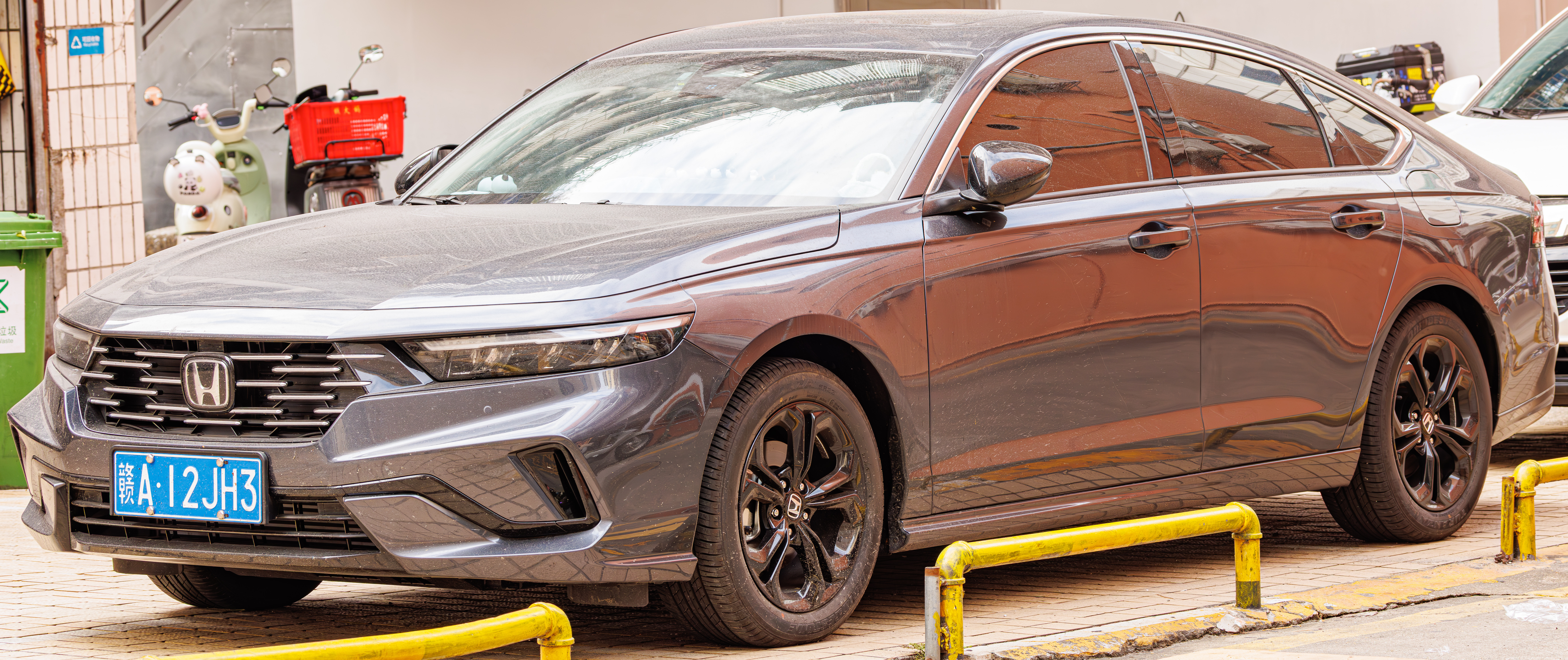
Honda Accord

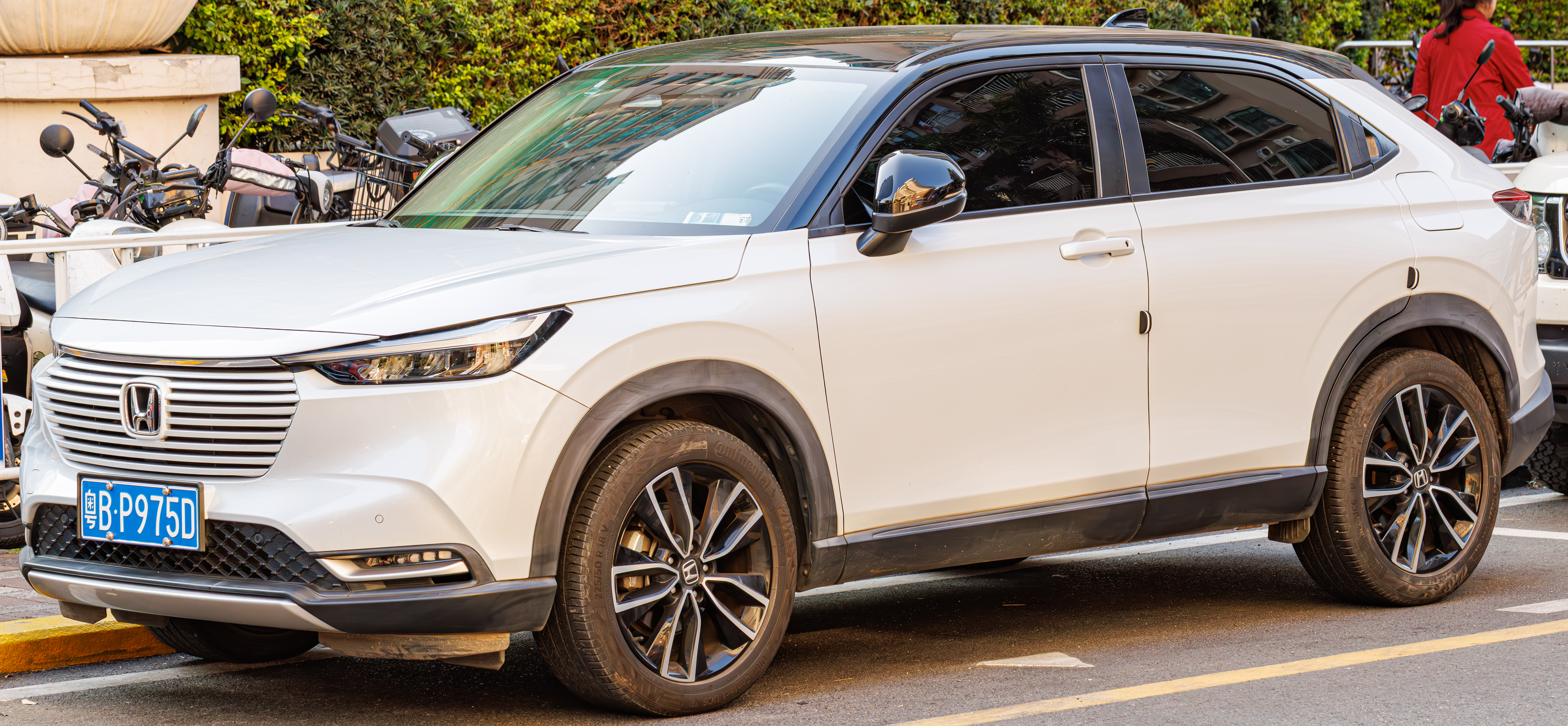
Honda Vezel

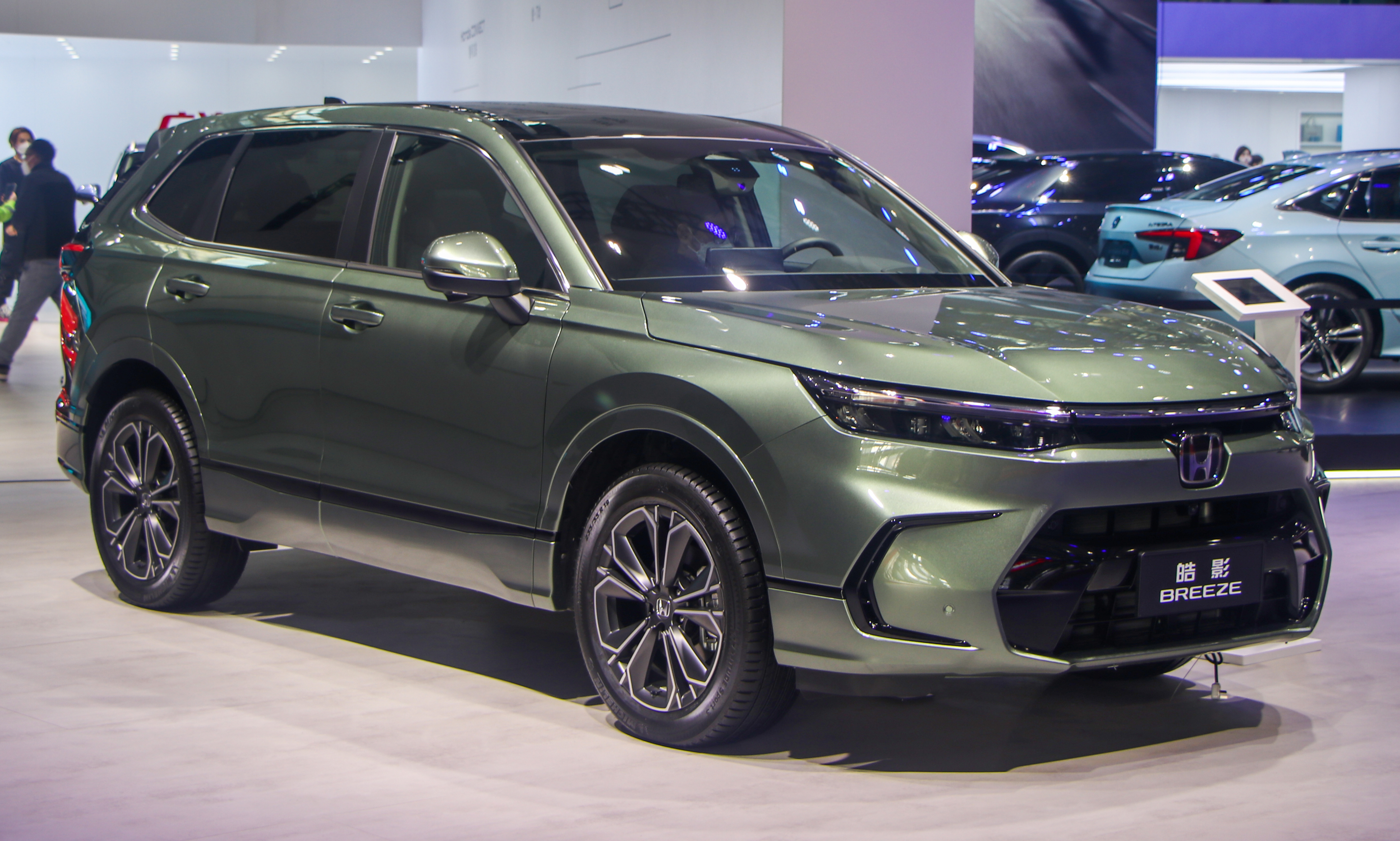
Honda Breeze

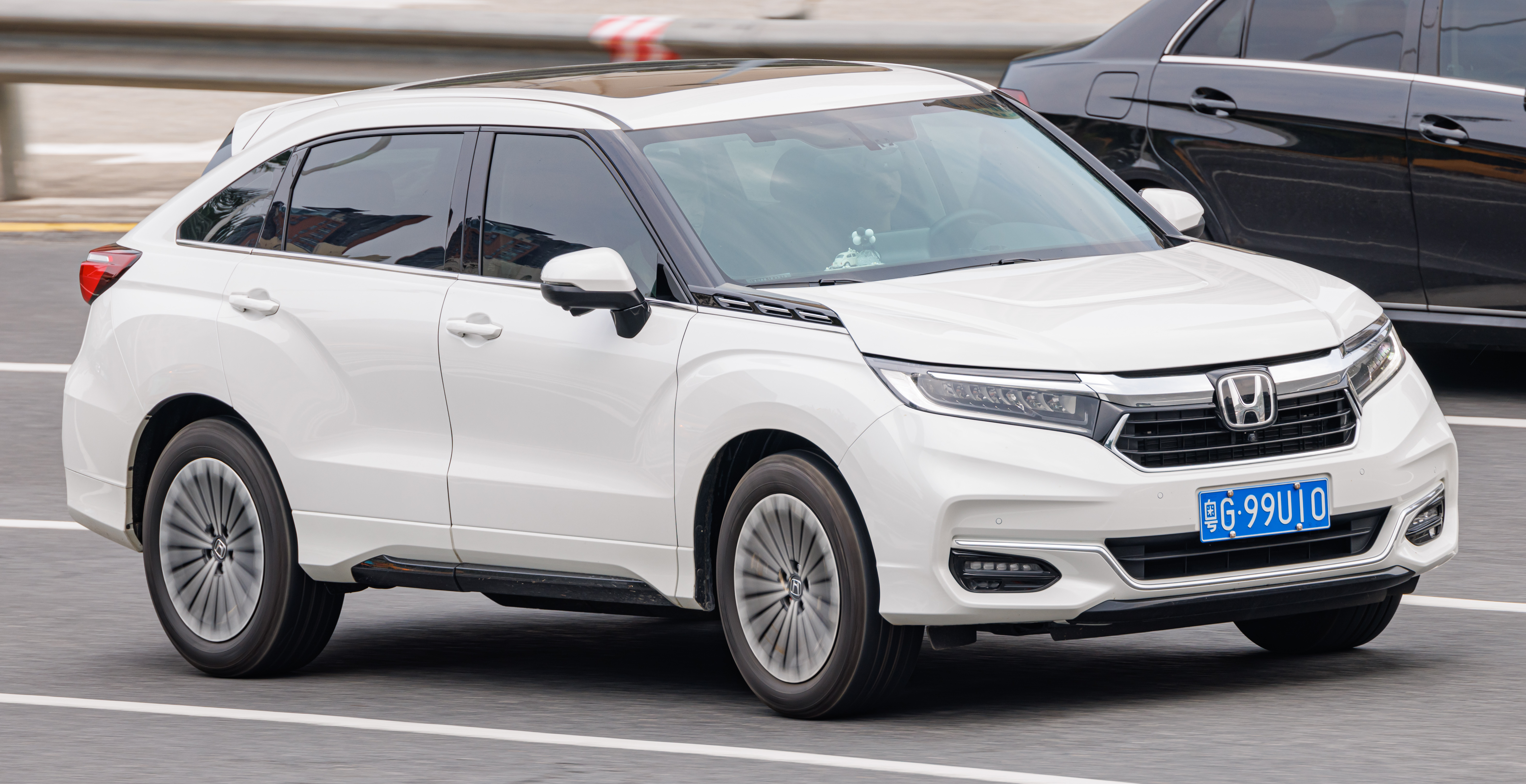
Honda Avancier

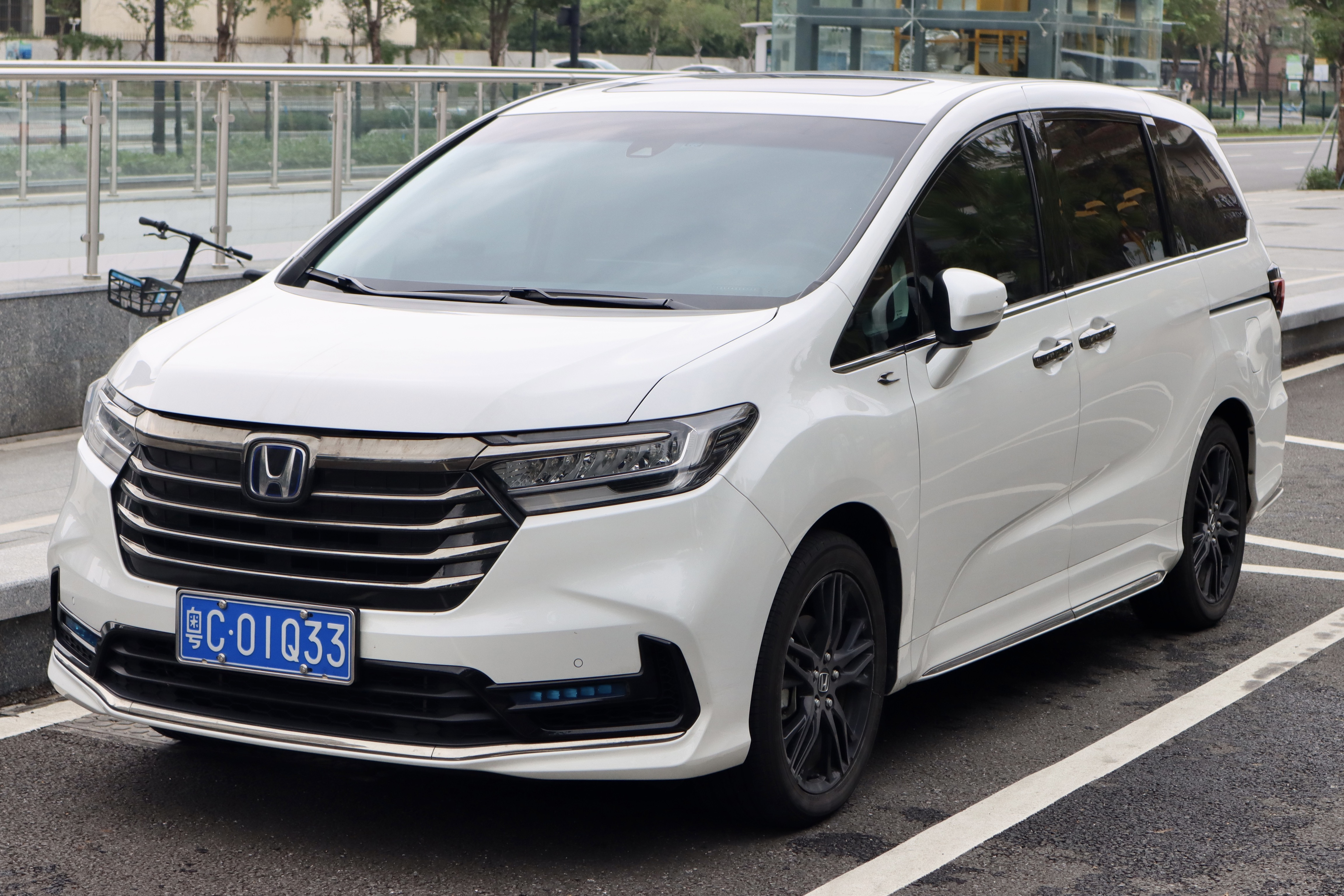
Honda Odyssey

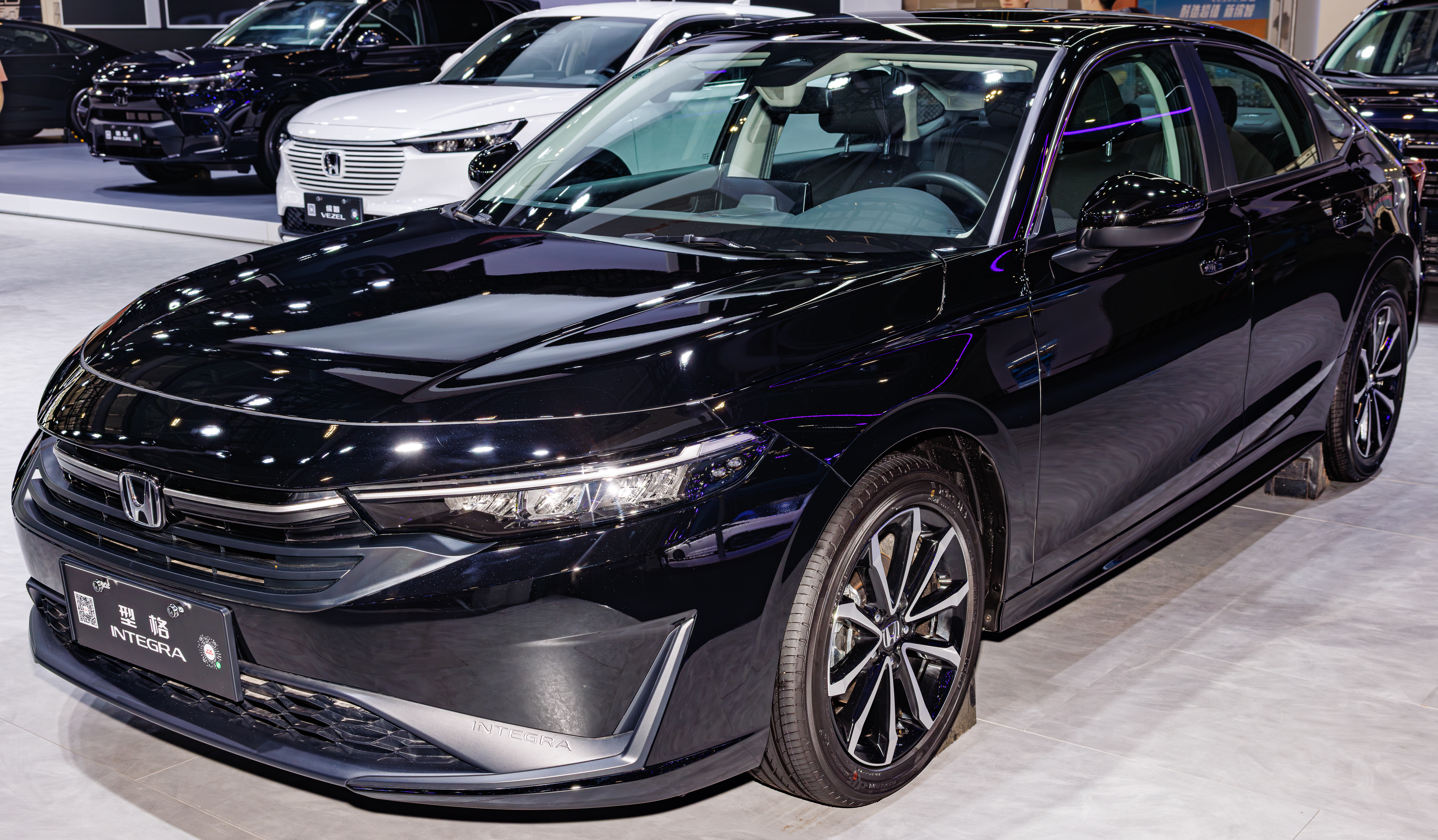
Honda Integra

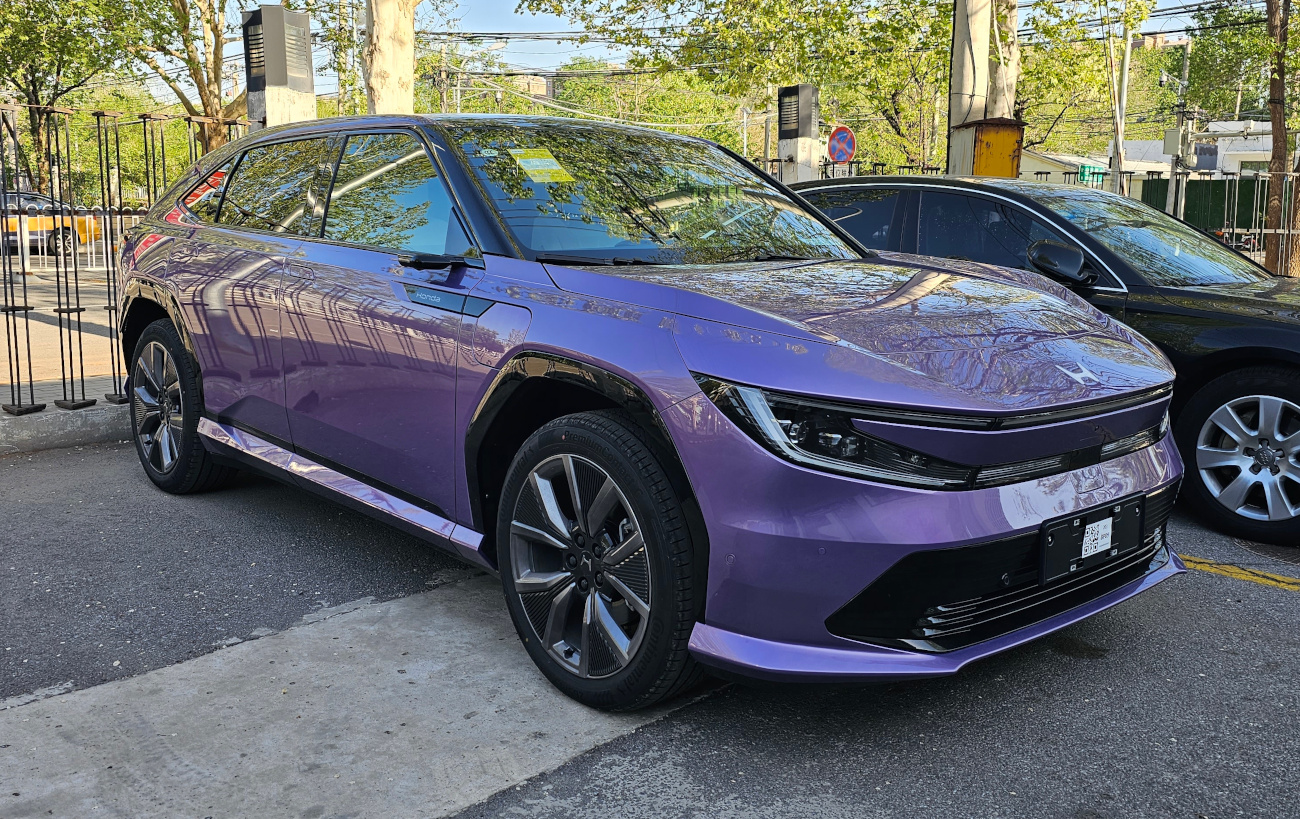
Honda P7

=== Former ===
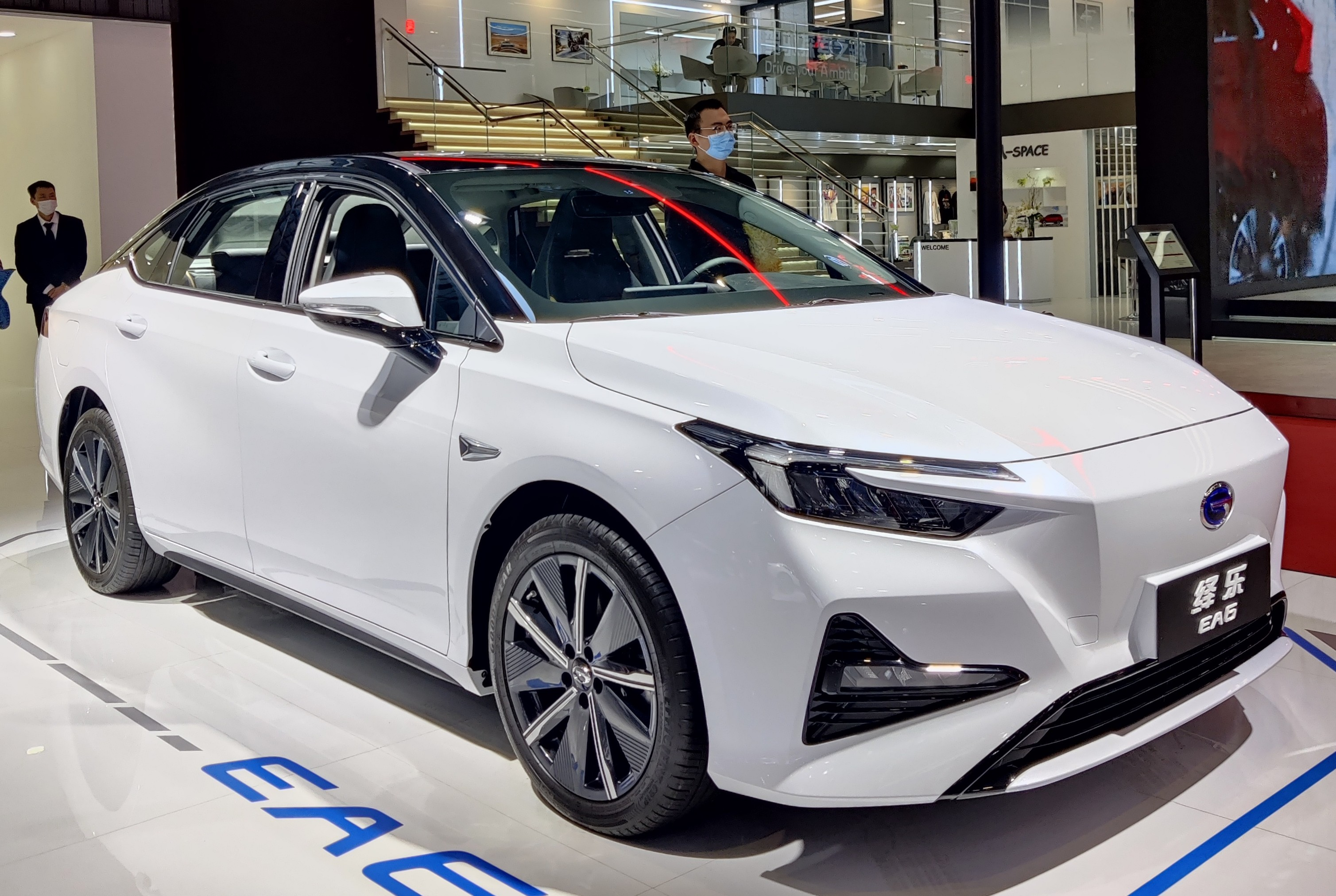
GAC-Honda EA6

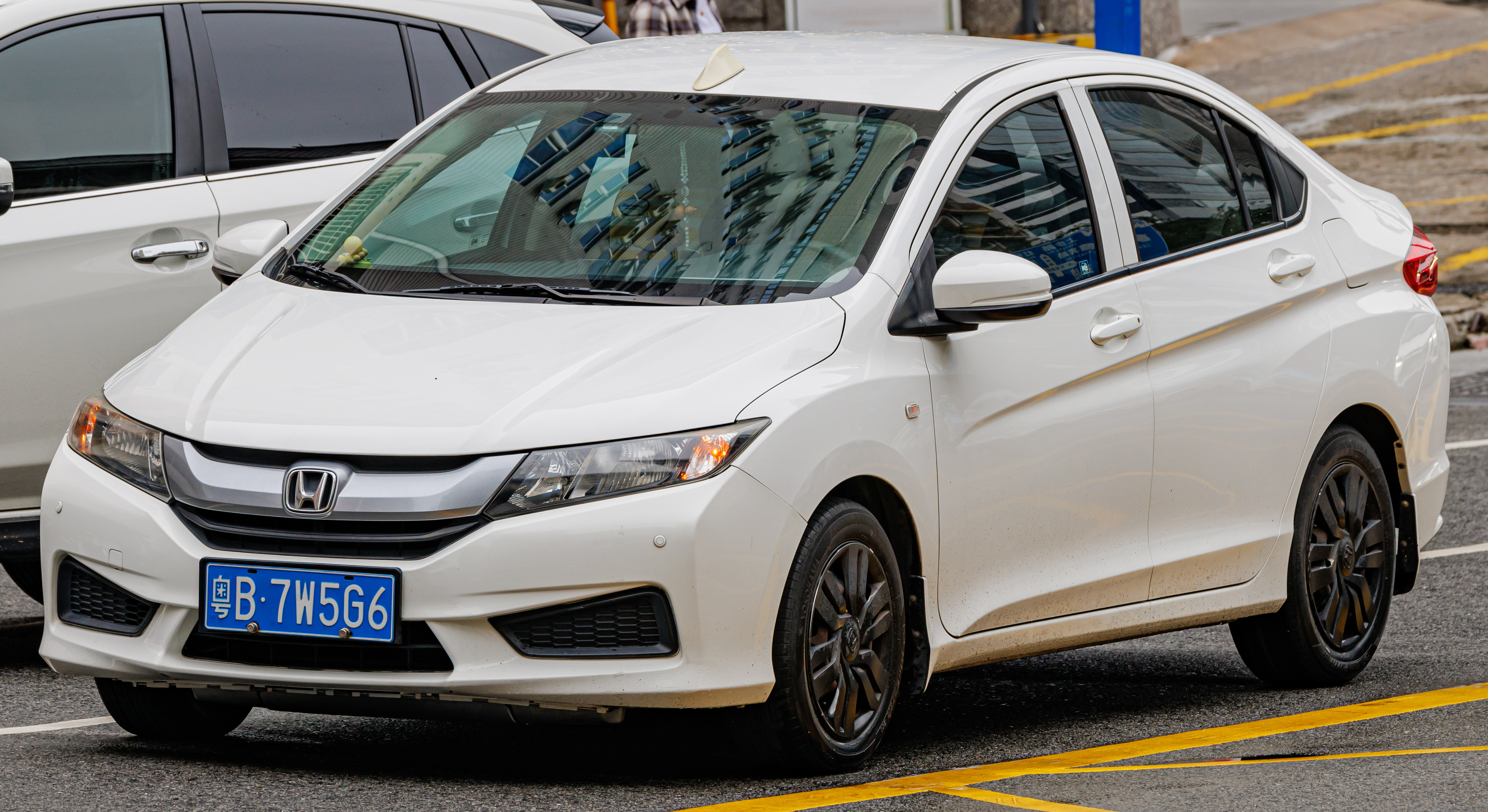
Honda City

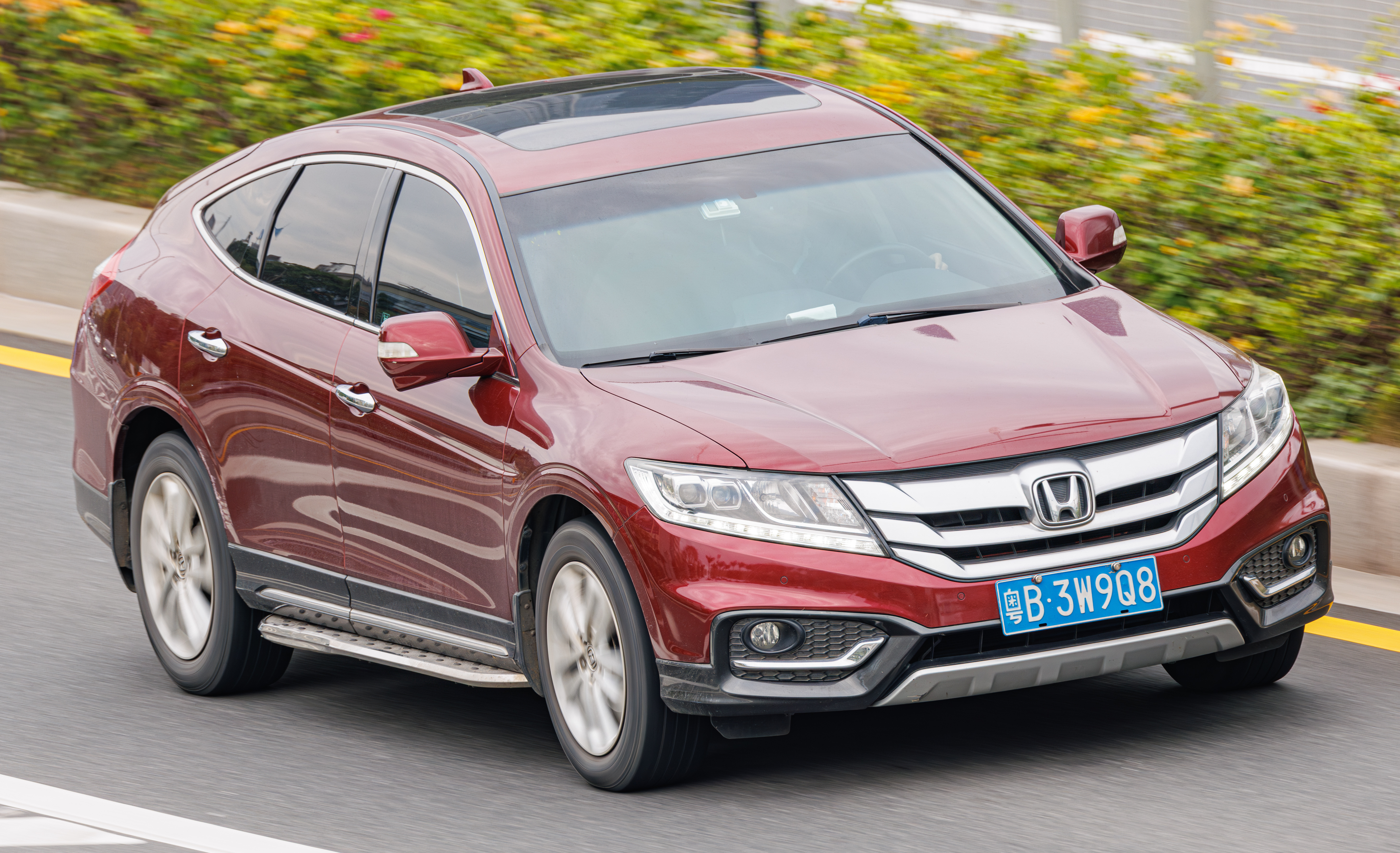
Honda Crosstour

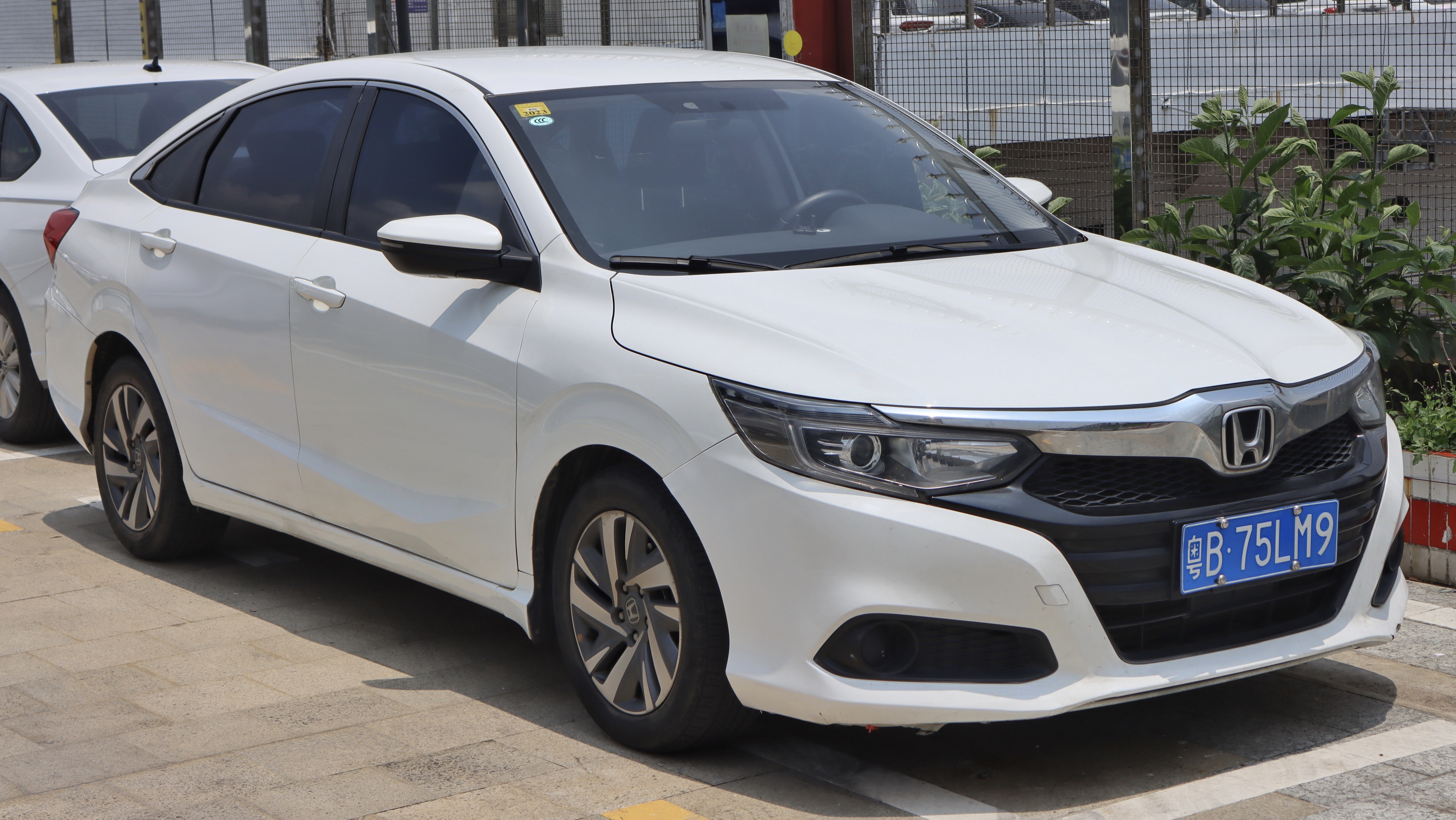
Honda Crider

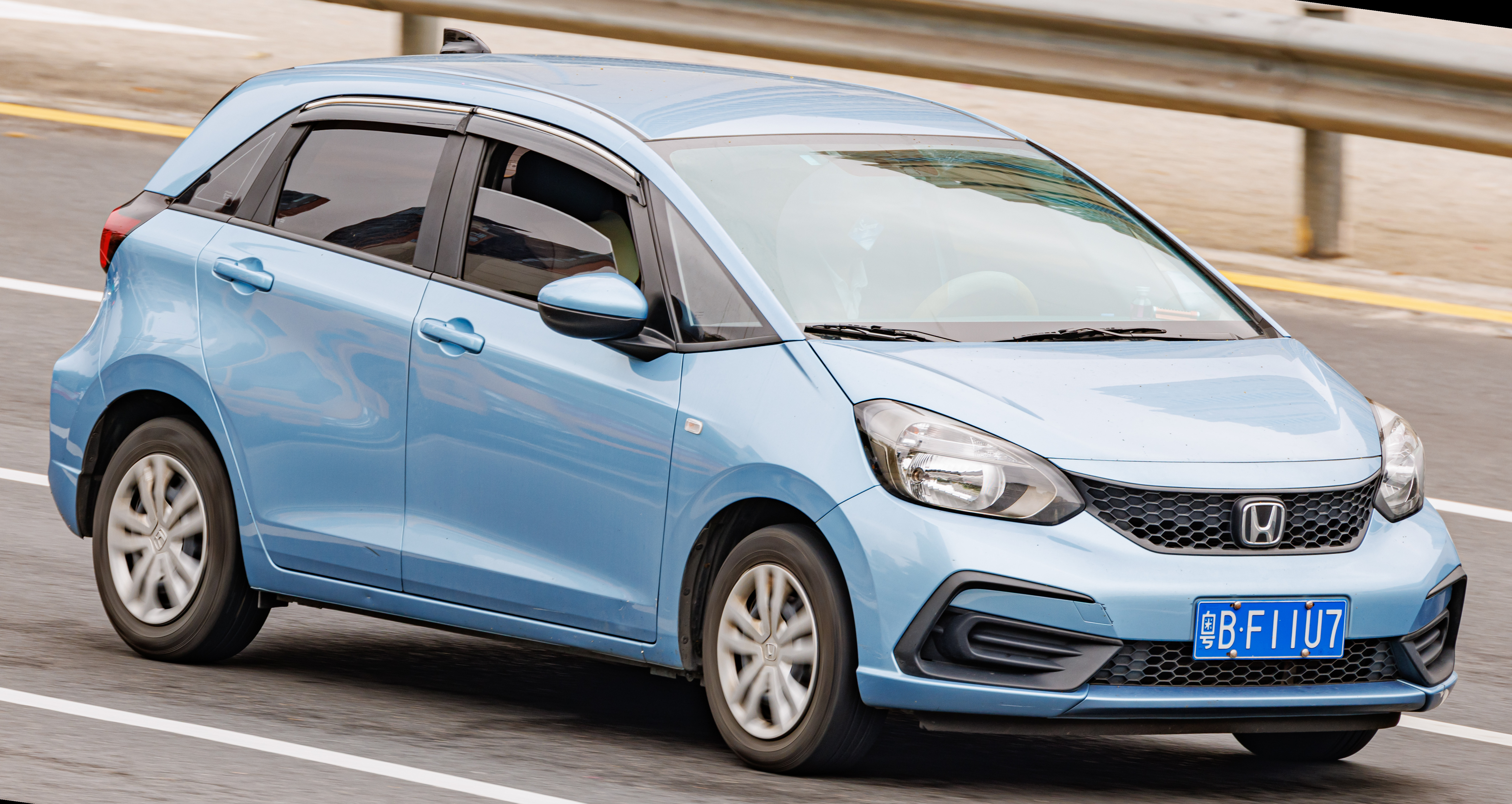
Honda Fit

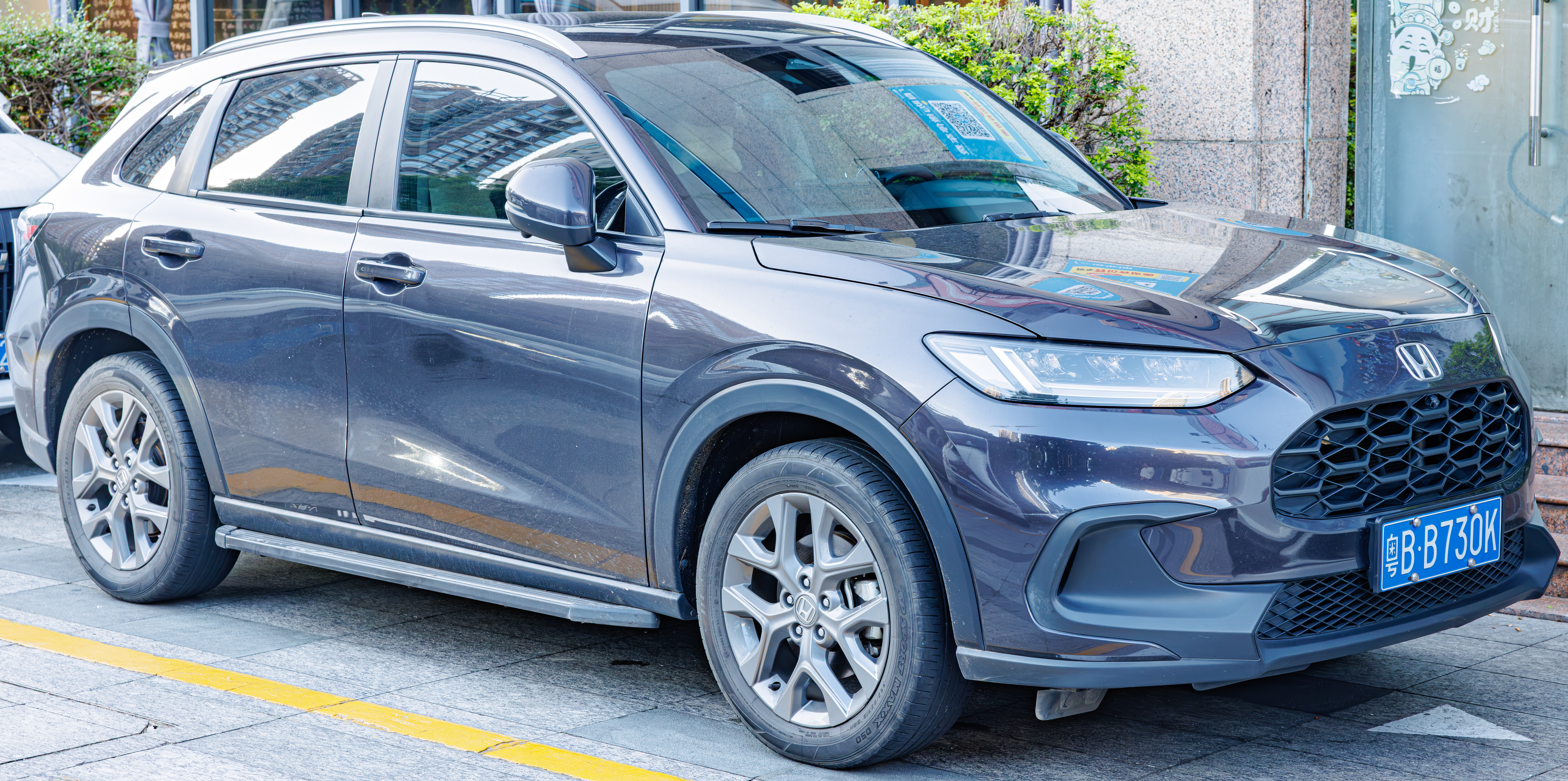
Honda ZR-V

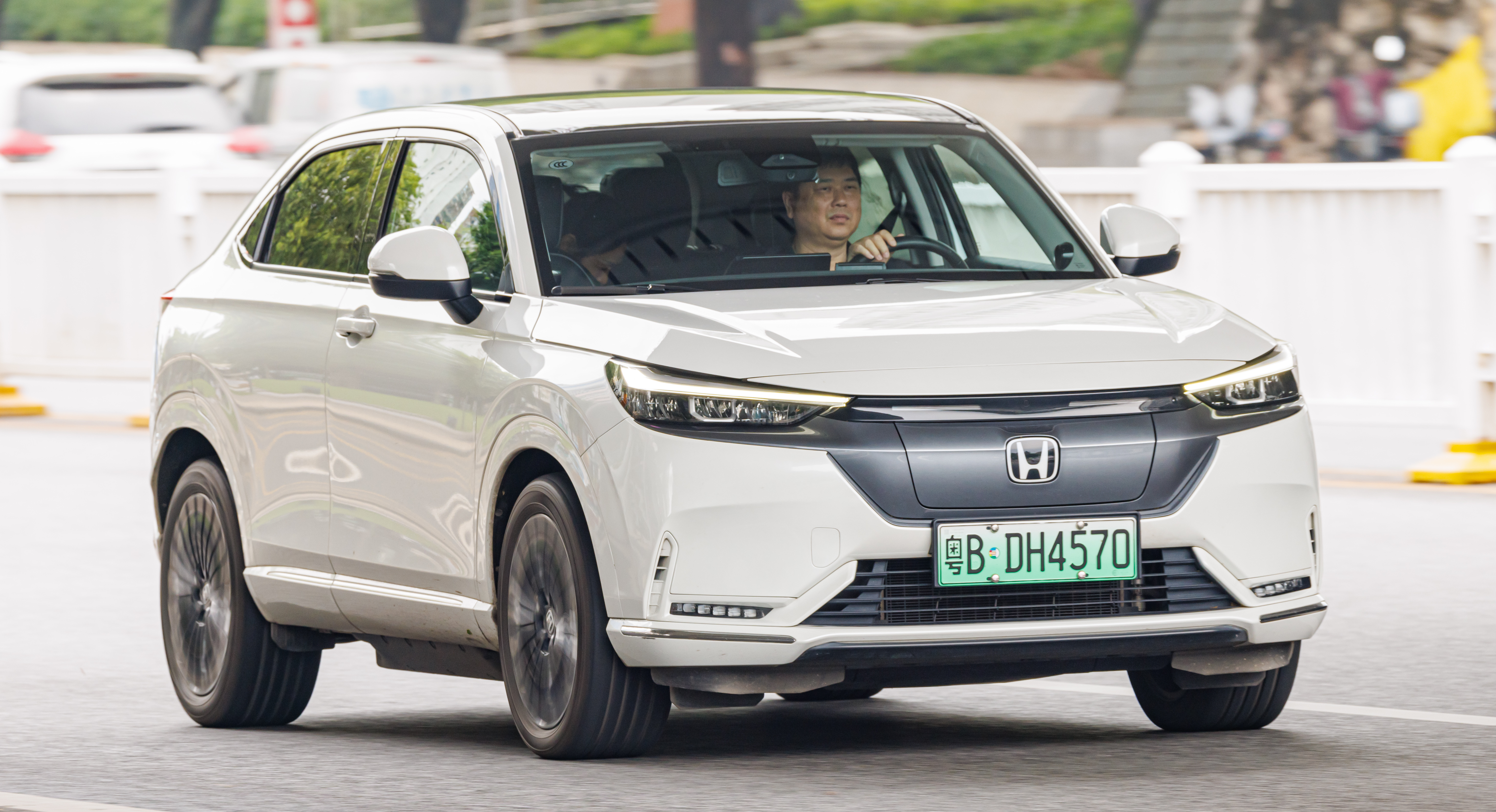
Honda e:NP1

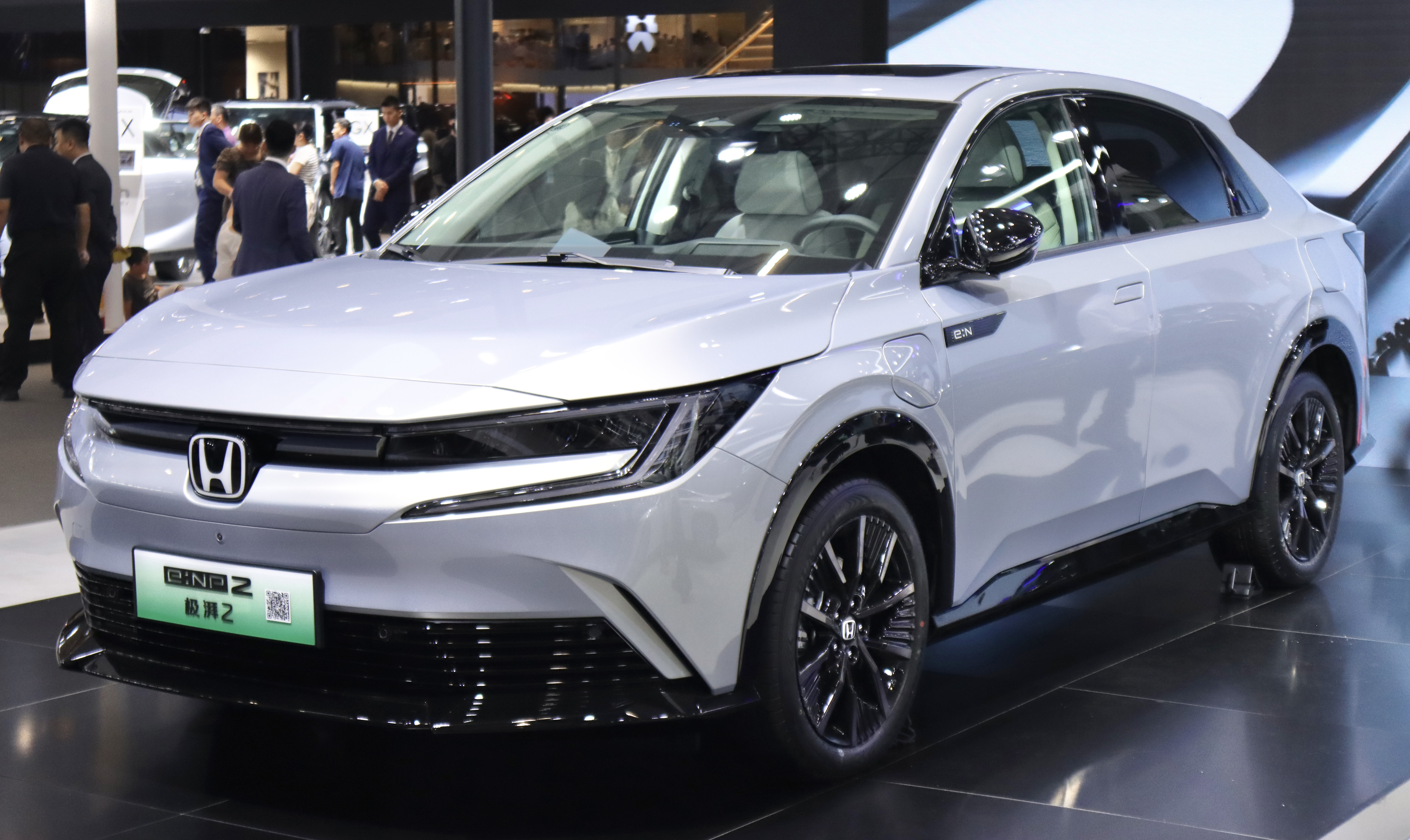
Honda e:NP2

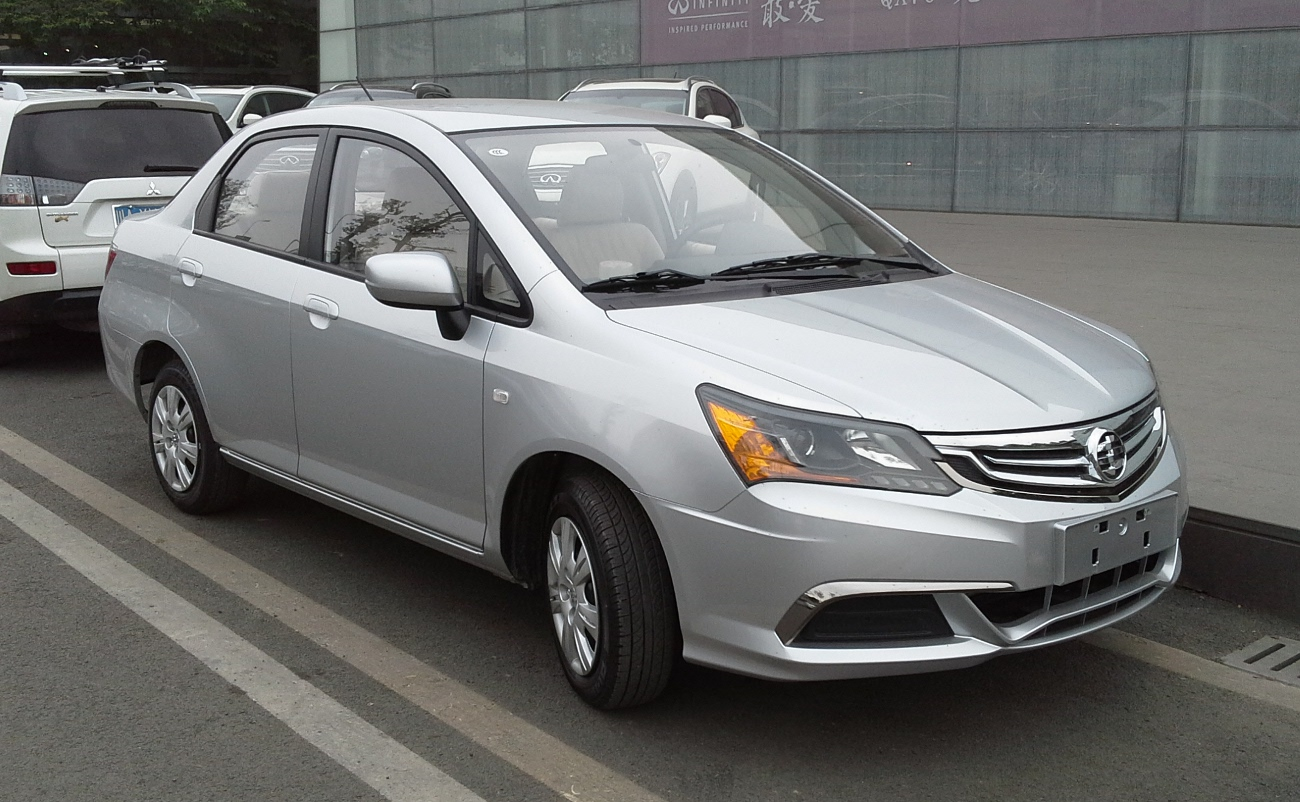
Everus S1

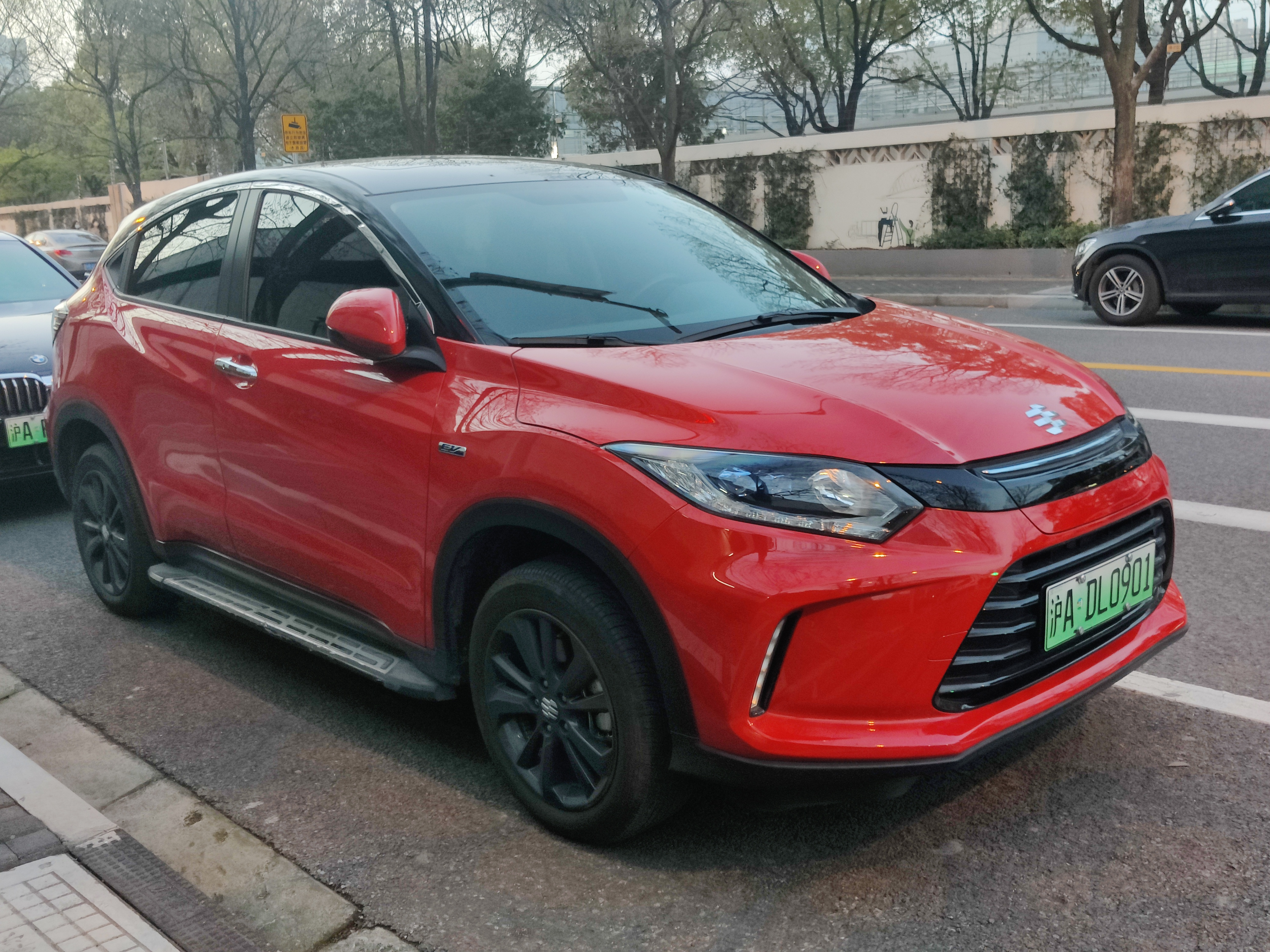
Everus VE-1

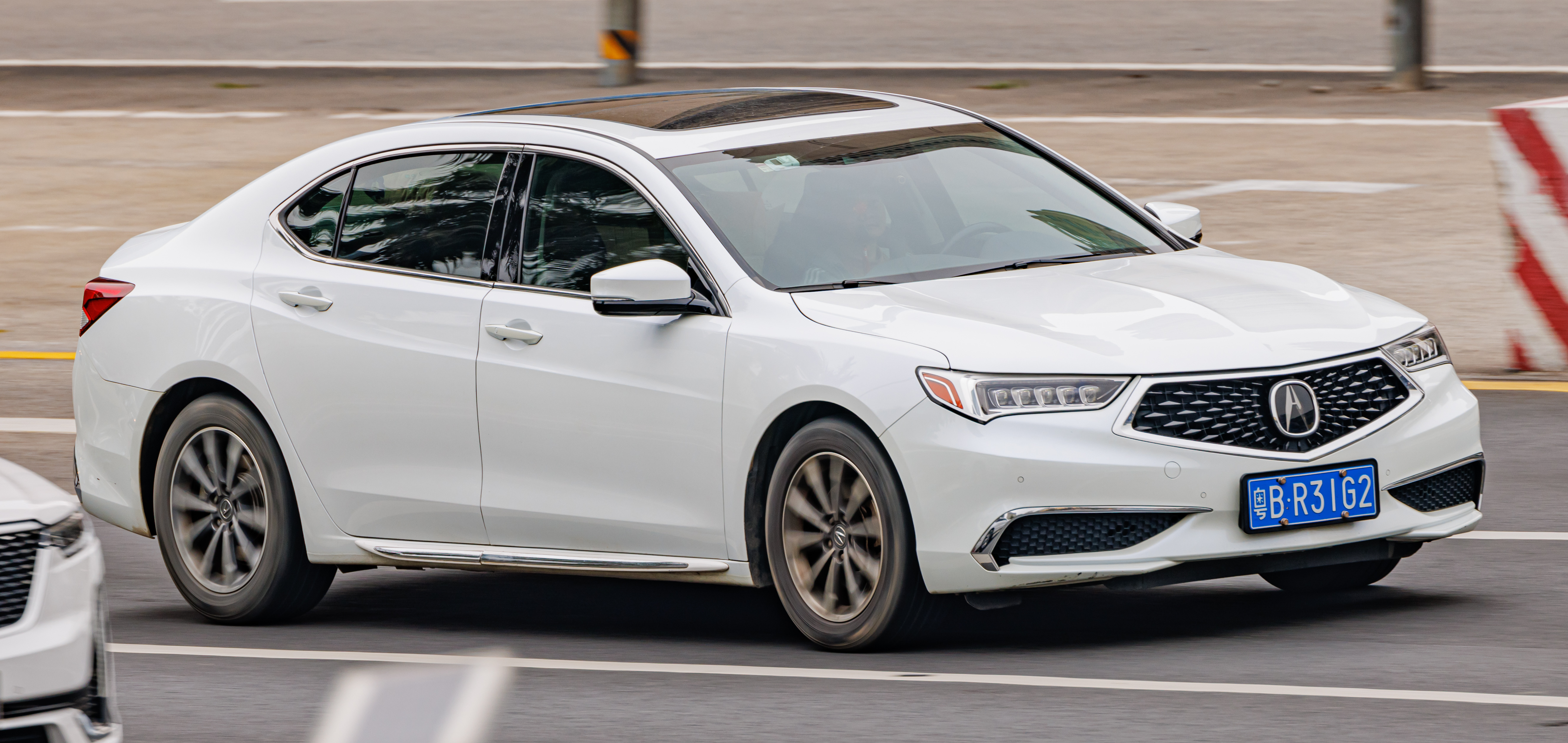
Acura TLX-L

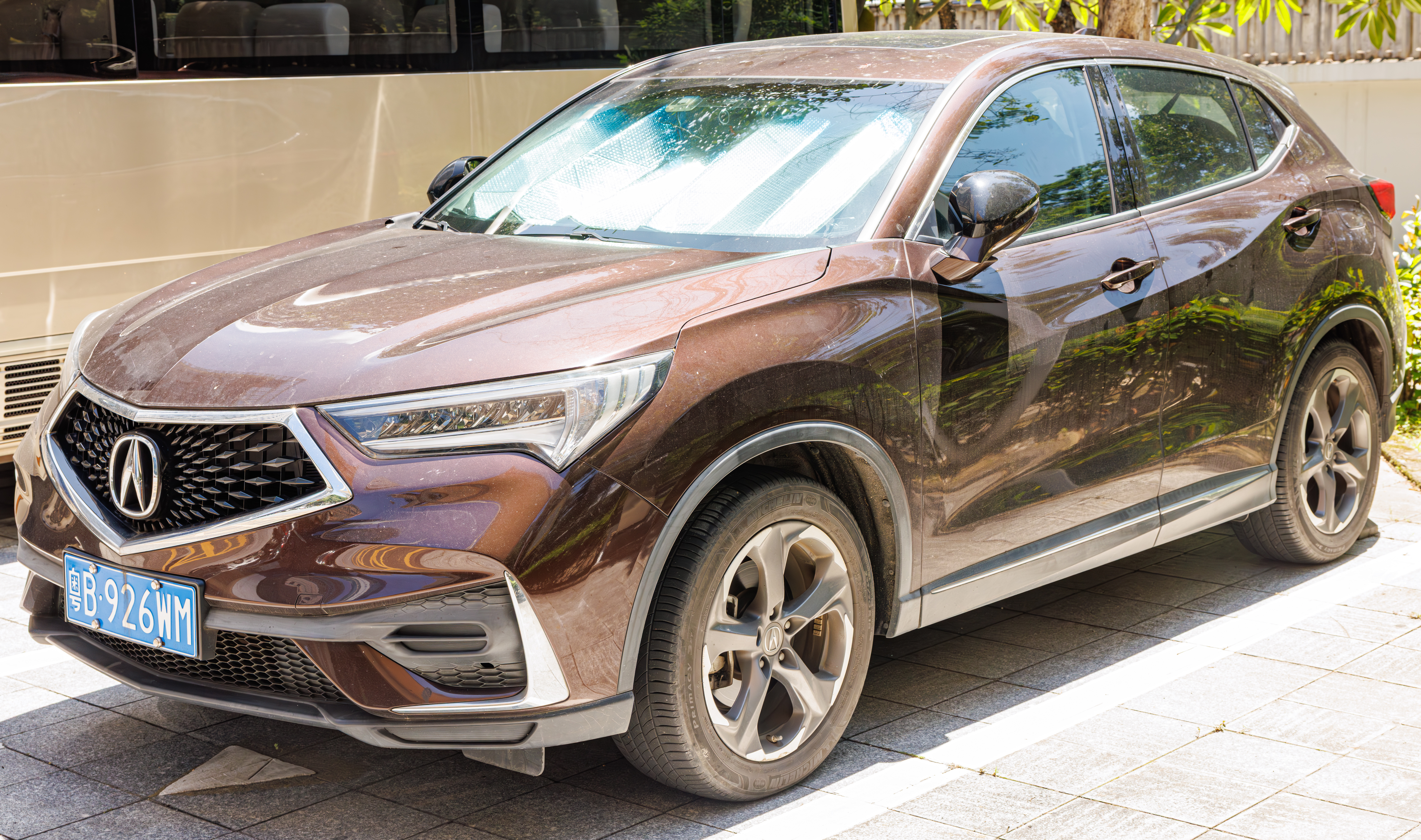
Acura CDX

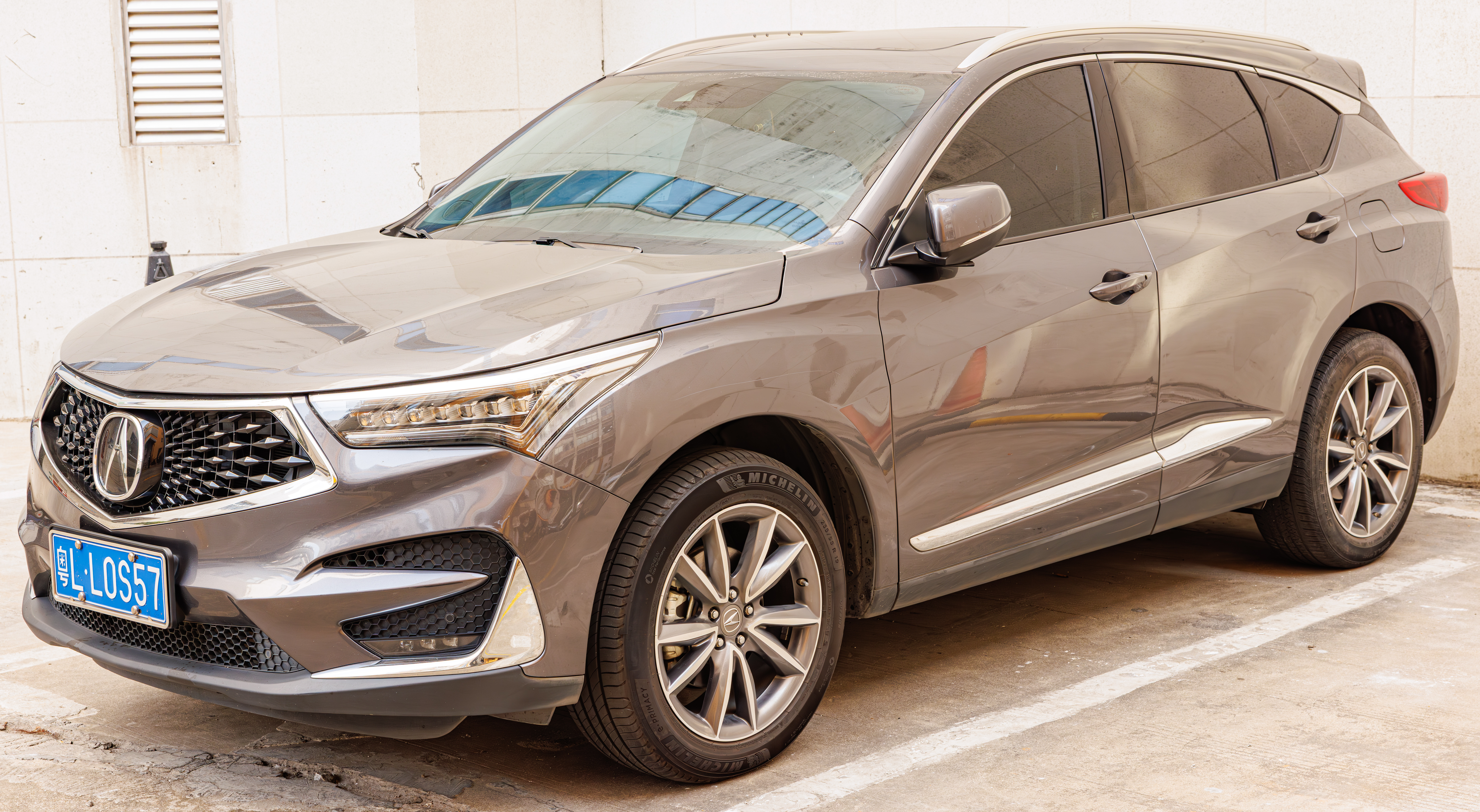
Acura RDX

== See also ==
- List of Honda assembly plants
- Dongfeng Honda
