= Everus =

Chinese automotive brand

Everus (Li Nian)
- Current owner: GAC Honda
- Country: People's Republic of China
- Introduced: 2008; 18 years ago
- Discontinued: July 2024
- Markets: People's Republic of China
- Website: www.everus.cn

Everus (Li Nian) is a car marque of GAC Honda, a joint venture between Honda and Guangzhou Automobile Group (GAC Group). Honda became the first foreign automaker to develop vehicles under a brand owned by its local joint venture automaker in China. Li Nian launched its first car, the S1 at the Shanghai Auto Show in April 2011. As of 2024, Everus have officially been defuncted.

== History ==
=== Beginnings ===
In 2008, joint venture Guangqi Honda between the Chinese car company GAC Group and the Japanese Honda decided to create a new brand, Everus, with the Chinese. The study announcement of the branch's first vehicle was the Li Nian Concept prototype in the form of a small roadster presented in 2008 at the Guangzhou Auto Show, and two years later a second concept car was presented in the form of a 4-door sedan.

Three years after its creation, in April 2011, Everus presented the first production car in the form of the subcompact sedan S1. It was not a new design, but a derivative of the already offered Honda City model, which was distinguished from it by cosmetic visual modifications. Two years after its launch, the company attempted to differentiate the S1 from the original design by introducing an extensive modernization. The model was sold until 2016, after which production of the Everus S1 came to an end with neither a successor nor plans to launch new products. The branch remained in this condition for another 2 years.

=== Reactivation and liquidation ===
The announcement of Everus' return to the market, this time under a completely new brand electric cars, was the Everus EV Concept study presented in April 2018 at the Beijing Auto Show. In November of the same year, a serial adaptation of this study was presented, as it was a slightly visually modified variation on the Honda Vezel already offered in China.

Everus VE-1 sealed the subsidiary's return to the Chinese market in December 2018, a month after its debut. As in the case of the previously offered S1 sedan, the VE-1 remained the only model in the Everus range and no decision was made to expand it in the next two years. In September 2020, the car underwent a minor modernization, during which it was decided to completely withdraw the Everus brand and include the VE-1 model directly in the GAC Honda portfolio. In 2021 Everus added the EA6 to its lineup. This is a rebadged GAC Aion S, which makes it exactly the same as the Lingzhi-Toyota iA5 except for its badges.

== Products ==
=== Everus S1 ===
The S1 is the first Everus car available for sale. It is a rebadged fourth-generation Honda City saloon and went on sale in April 2011.

=== Everus VE-1 ===
An electric subcompact SUV loosely based on Honda Vezel that was previewed by the Everus EV concept. The vehicle is jointly developed by Honda and GAC Honda, with a range of 340 kilometres (210 miles) from the 53.6-kWh lithium-ion battery (NCM622) on the New European Driving Cycle, powered by an electric motor drives with 120 kilowatts (160 hp) and 280 newton-metres (210 lb⋅ft) of torque.

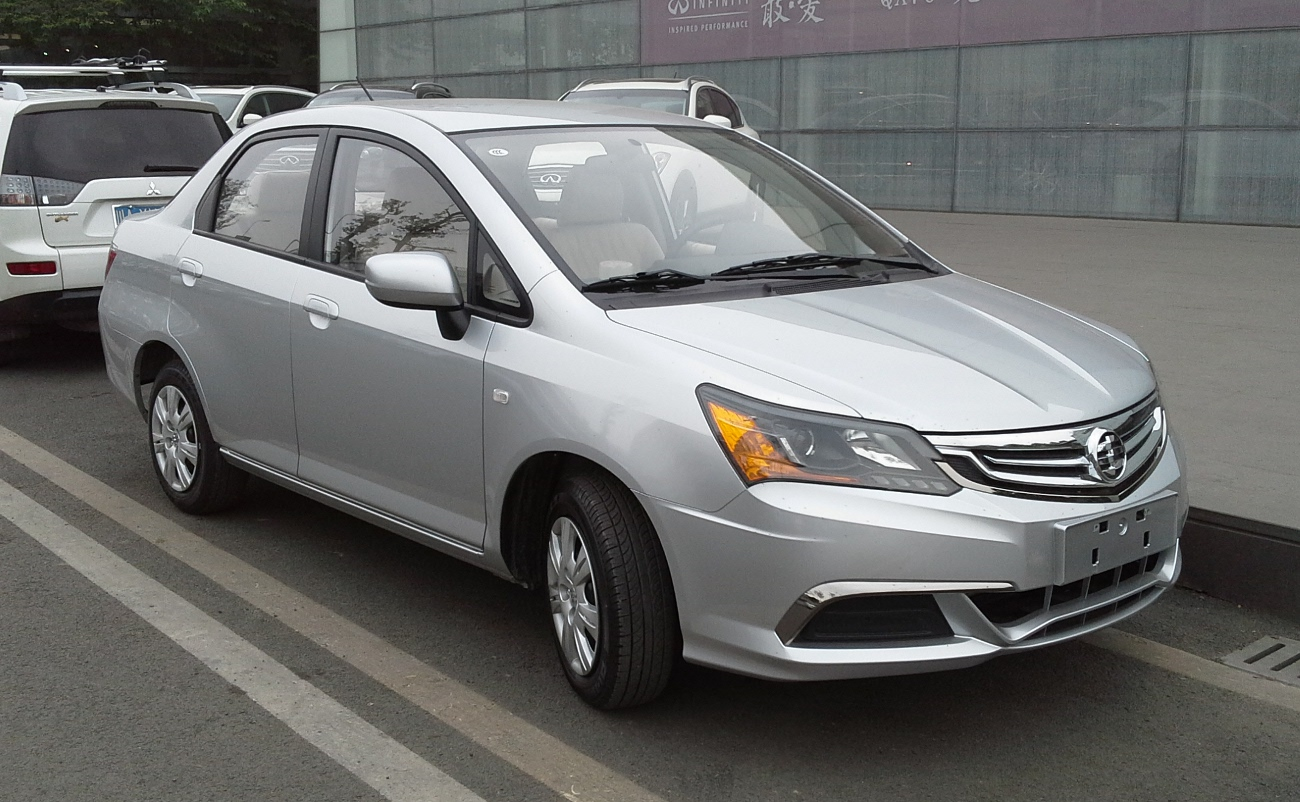
Everus S1

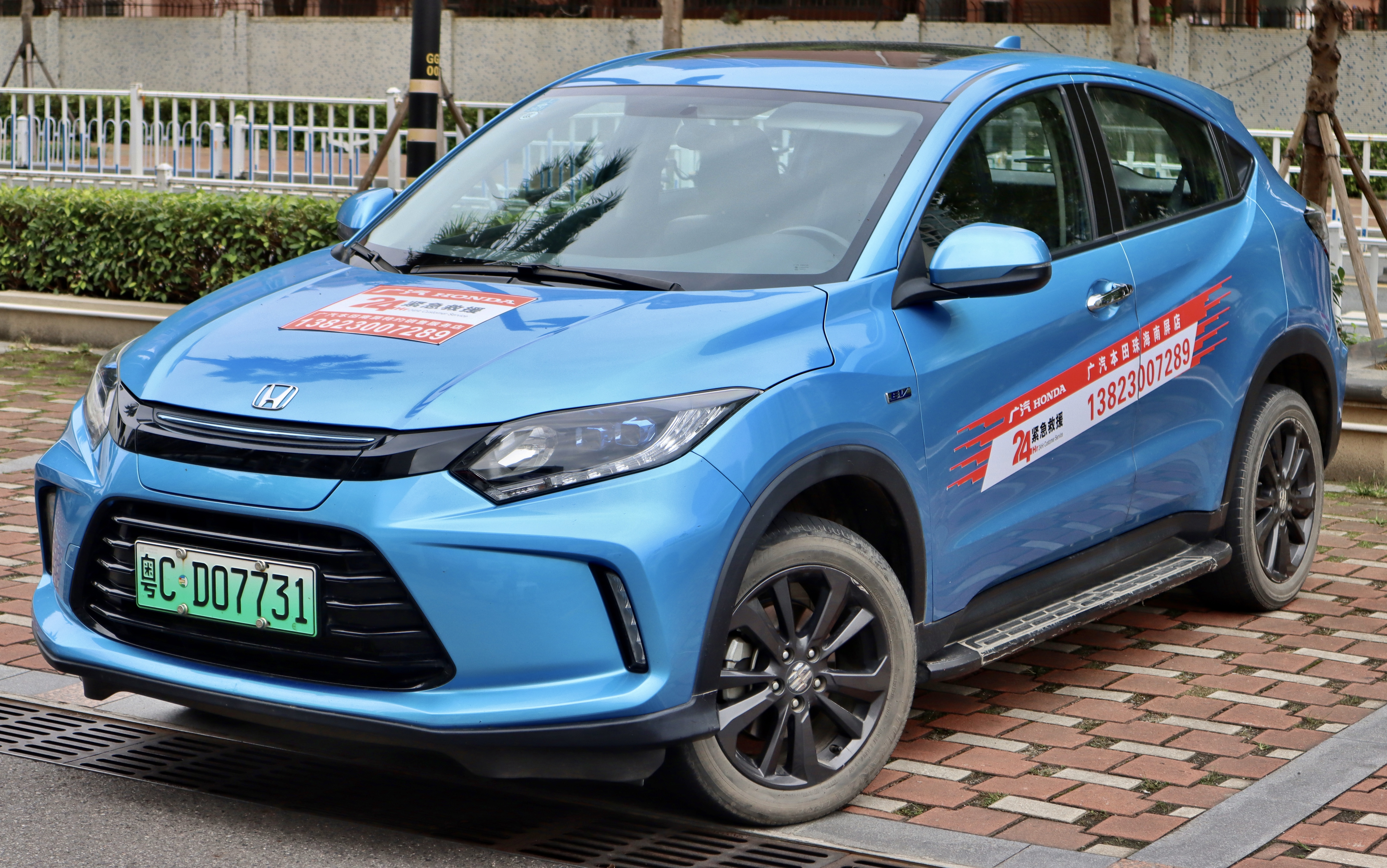
Everus VE-1

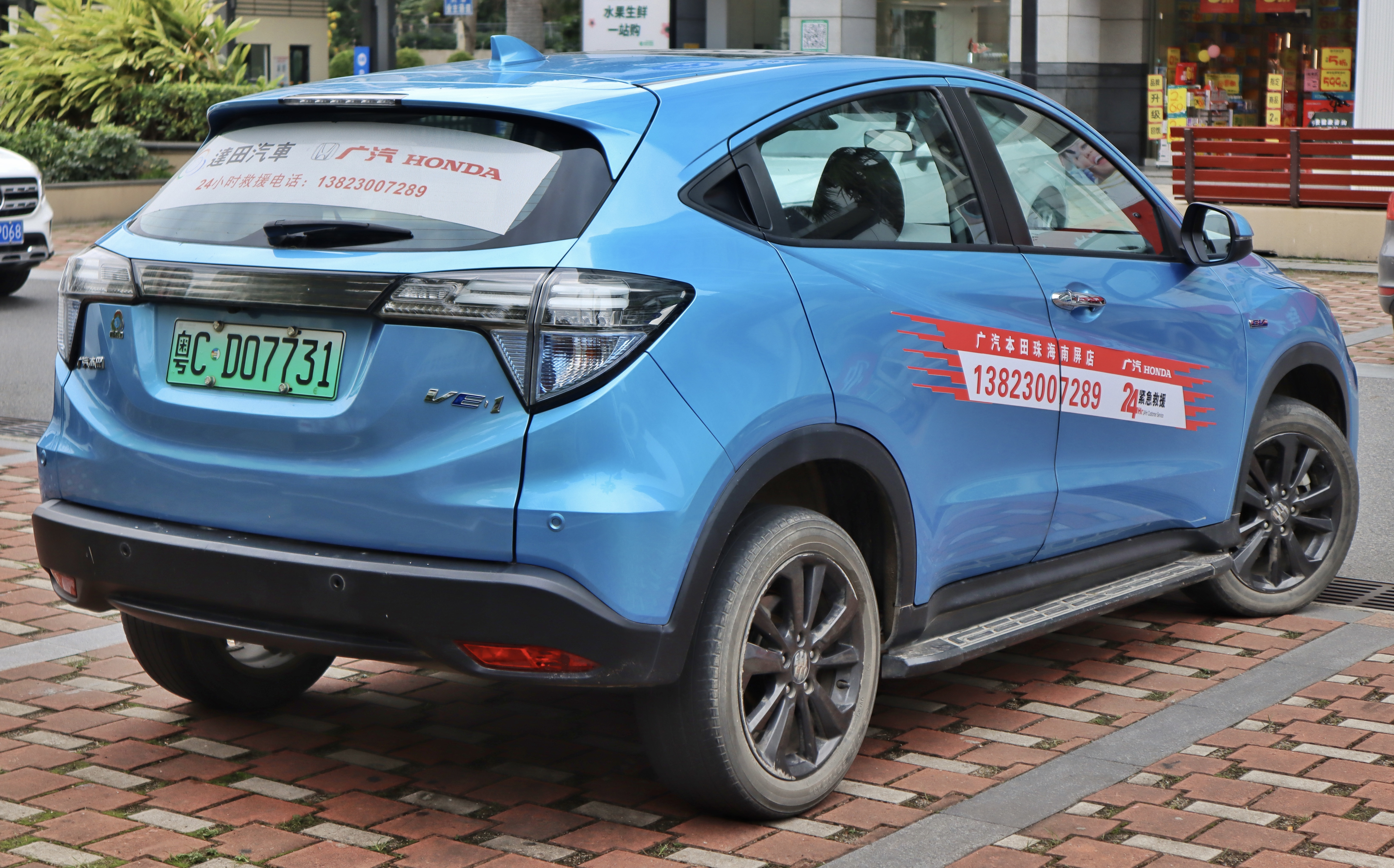
Everus VE-1 rear

== Concept cars ==
To announce the Everus marque in 2008, Li Nian, a compact SUV concept car was revealed at the Beijing International Automobile Exhibition Auto China.

The Li Nian Roadster concept was shown by Guangqi Honda in 2009 Shanghai Auto Show.

The Li Nian Sedan concept was debuted at Auto China 2010 in Beijing.

The EV SUV concept was debuted at Auto China 2018 in Beijing.

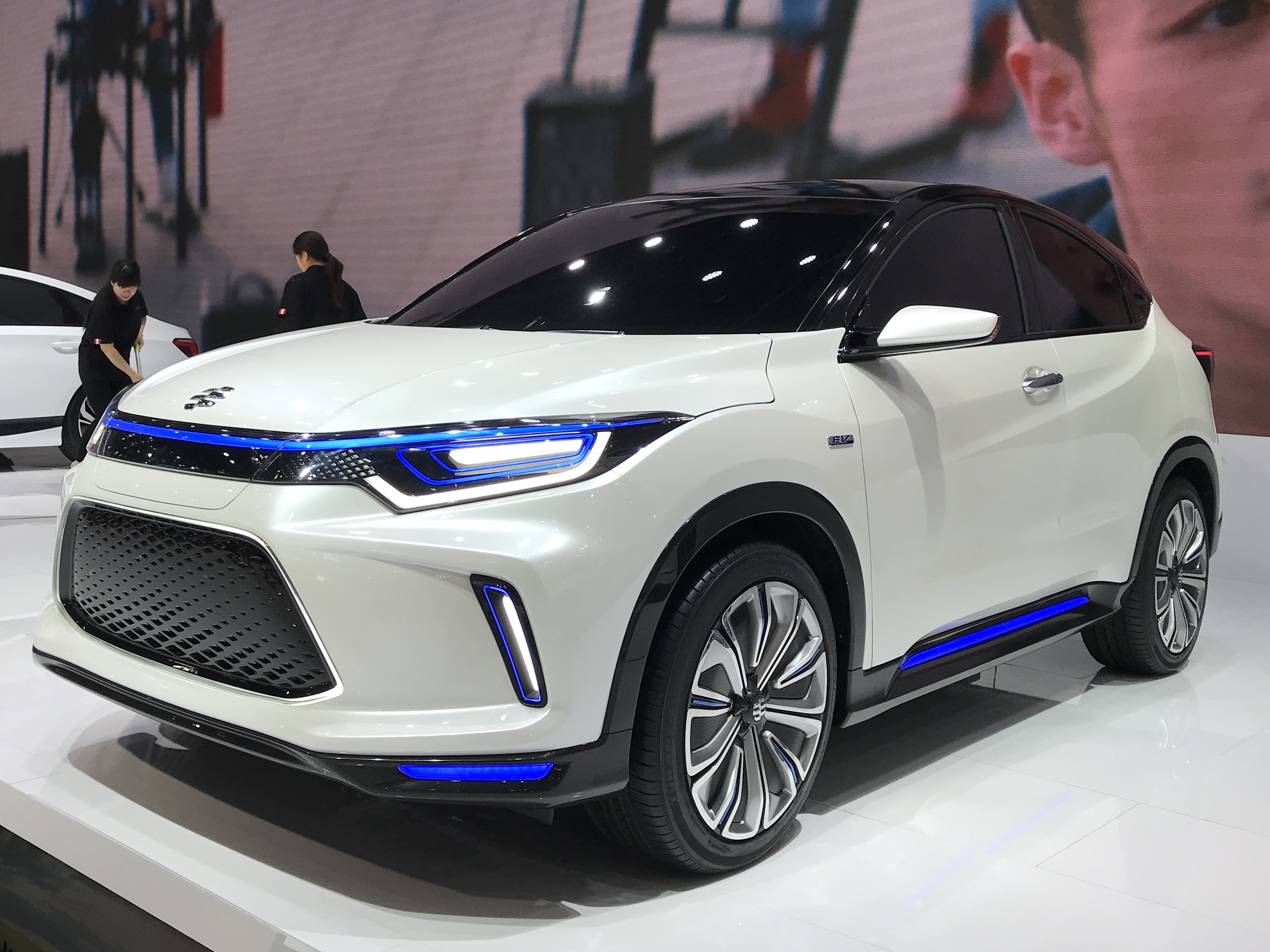
Everus EV concept
