= Honda Automobile (China) =

Chinese subsidiary of Honda

Honda Automobile (China) Co., Ltd.
- Industry: Automotive
- Founded: 8 September 2003; 23 years ago
- Defunct: 1 April 2020; 6 years ago
- Fate: Absorbed by GAC Honda
- Successor: Guangzhou Development District Factory
- Headquarters: Guangzhou, China
- Area served: Exported worldwide
- Key people: Yasuhide Mizuno
- Production output: 10,800 units (2016)
Owners
Honda	(65%)
GAC Group	(25%)
Dongfeng Motor Group	(10%)
- Parent: Honda

Chinese name
- Simplified Chinese: 本田汽车（中国）有限公司
- Traditional Chinese: 本田汽車（中國）有限公司
Transcriptions

Alternative Chinese name
- Simplified Chinese: 本田中国
- Traditional Chinese: 本田中國
Transcriptions
- Website: https://www.honda.com.cn/

Honda Automobile (China) Co., Ltd. previously known as China Honda Automobile Co., Ltd. (CHAC) was a joint venture automobile manufacturing plant owned by Honda and Chinese companies GAC Group and Dongfeng Motor Group. The plant solely produced vehicles for international exports, while vehicles for domestic market supply are manufactured by 50-50 joint ventures Dongfeng Honda and Guangqi Honda.

== History ==
Honda Automobile (China) Co., Ltd. was a joint venture of Honda (65%), (Note: 10% owned via a China incorporated subsidiary (Chinese: 本田技研工业（中国）投资有限公司); NOT to be confused with Hong Kong incorporated "Honda Motor (China) Limited" (Chinese: 本田技研工業（中國）有限公司), founded in 1992) GAC Group (25%) and Dongfeng Motor Group (10%), incorporated on 8 September 2003. It was located in Guangzhou. Dongfeng and GAC had formed separate joint venture with Honda as Dongfeng Honda (in July 2003) and Guangqi Honda (in 1998) respectively. In 2018, Dongfeng made a public invitation to buy their stake in Honda China.

It was reported in 2004, that the joint venture would export most of their products to Europe, as well as Southeast Asia. Exports to Canada commenced in 2011.

As of 2016, the plant exports mainly to the Middle East, Latin America, Russia and Africa.

On 1 April 2020, the Guangqi Honda joint venture officially absorbed the plant and renamed it as the Guangzhou Development District Factory. The absorbed plant will produce up to 50,000 vehicles annually, boosting the total annual production capacity of Guangqi Honda to 770,000 units per year. Under the new name, the plant will begin producing the Accord for the Chinese domestic market, while continuing to produce and export the City model for the Mexican market up to 2020.

== See also ==
- List of Honda assembly plants
