= Honda automobile dealerships (Japan) =

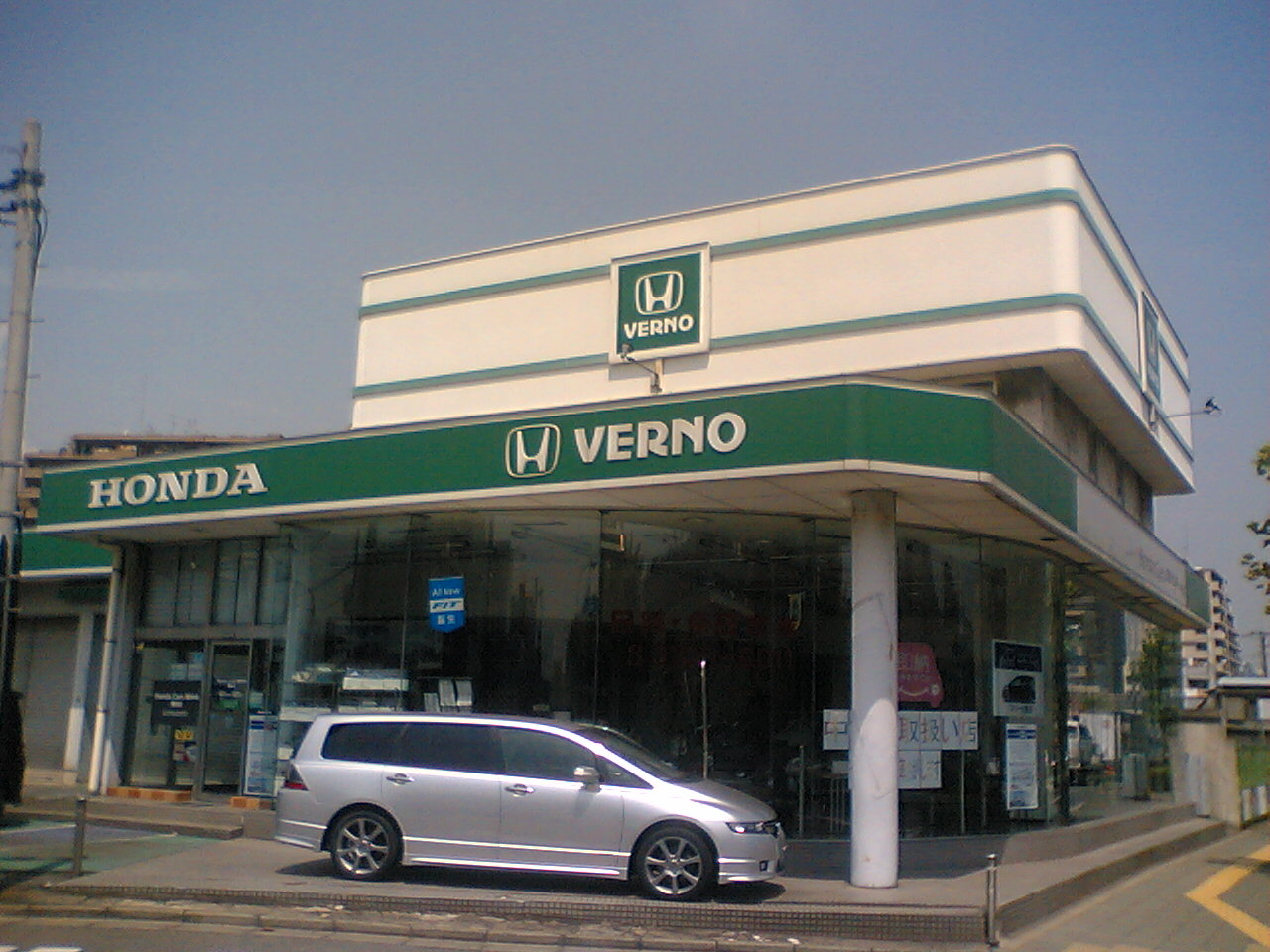
Honda Verno (2008)

Honda Verno, Honda Clio, and Honda Primo were separate dealership networks used by Honda to sell its vehicles in Japan between 1978 and 2006. Honda established the three chains in succession, each carrying a distinct range of models, as part of a wider trend among Japanese manufacturers, led by rivals Toyota and Nissan, toward multiple, differentiated sales channels. The three networks were consolidated into a single Honda Cars dealership brand in March 2006, though some individual dealerships continued to use the older network names afterward.

== History ==
Honda Verno, the first of the three, was established in 1978 alongside the launch of the Honda Prelude and carried vehicles positioned as more sporting and better equipped than the rest of Honda's lineup. Honda Clio followed in 1984, selling models such as the Honda Accord that had traditionally been offered through Honda's original dealerships, while Honda Primo was created in 1985 to sell smaller cars such as the Honda Civic, kei cars, and other Honda products including motorcycles and general-purpose equipment.

Honda also operates several related retail networks in Japan, including Honda Access for accessories, Honda Wing for motorcycles, and Honda Auto Terrace for used vehicles, and briefly introduced a compact-car-focused Honda Cars Small Store format beginning in 2012.

Starting in 1978, Honda in Japan decided to diversify its sales distribution channels and created Honda Verno, which sold established products with a higher content of standard equipment and more sporting nature. The establishment of Honda Verno coincided with its new sports compact, the Honda Prelude. Later, the Honda Vigor, Honda Ballade, and Honda Quint were added to Honda Verno stores. This approach was implemented due to efforts in place by rival Japanese automakers Toyota and Nissan.

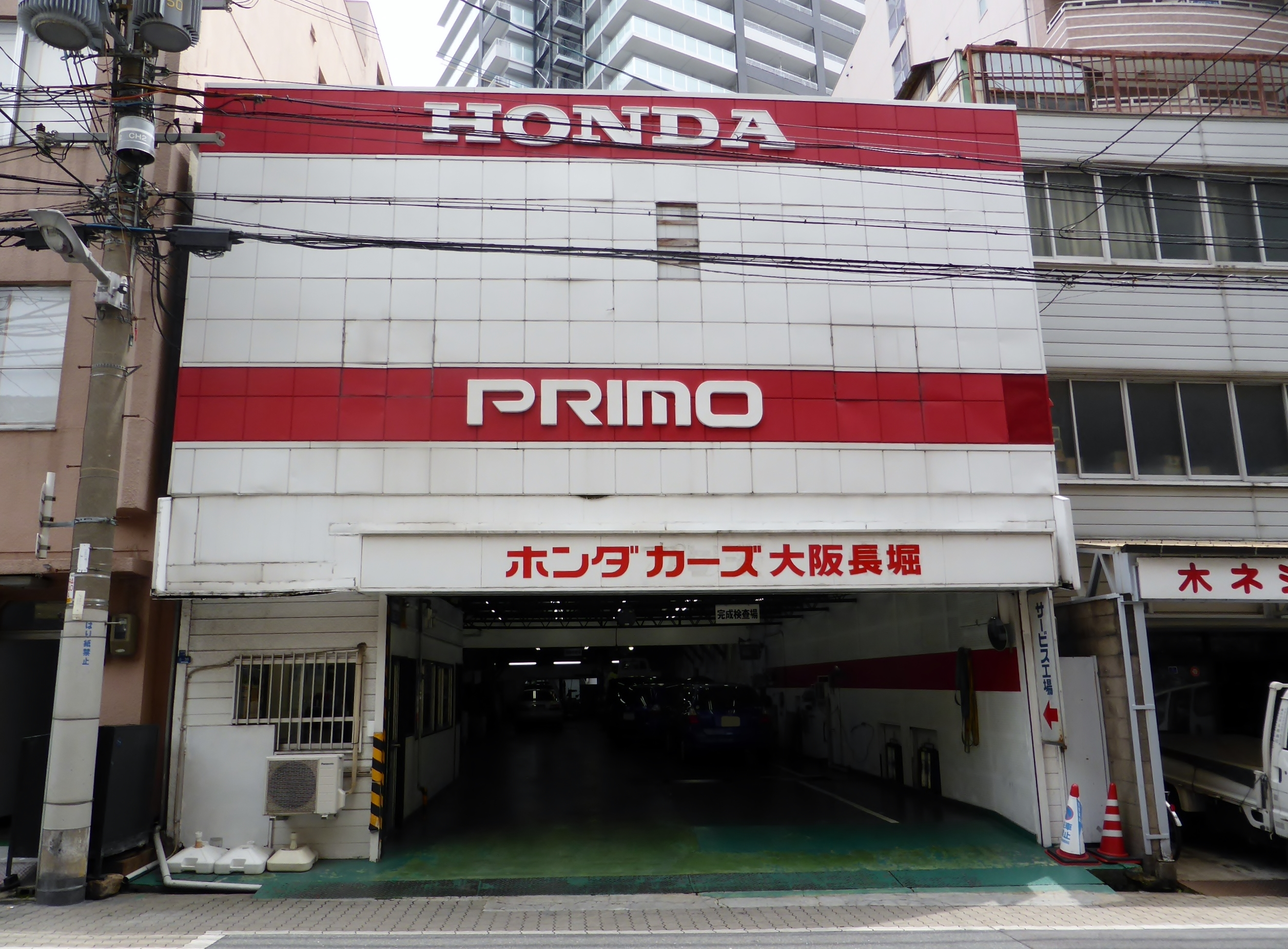
Honda Primo (Osaka)

As sales progressed, Honda created two more sales channels, called Honda Clio in 1984, and Honda Primo in 1985. The Honda Clio chain sold products that were traditionally associated with Honda dealerships before 1978, like the Honda Accord, and Honda Primo sold the Honda Civic, kei cars such as the Honda Today, superminis like the Honda Capa, along with other Honda products, such as farm equipment, lawnmowers, portable generators, and marine equipment, plus motorcycles and scooters like the Honda Super Cub. A styling tradition was established when Honda Primo and Clio began operations in that all Verno products had the rear license plate installed in the rear bumper, while Primo and Clio products had the rear license plate installed on the trunk lid or rear door for minivans. The Renault Clio was sold in Japan at Nissan dealerships, but was renamed the Renault Lutecia due to Honda's rights over the Clio name. Lutecia is derived from the name of Lutetia, an ancient Roman city that was the predecessor of Paris.

As time progressed and sales began to diminish partly due to the collapse of the Japanese "bubble economy", "supermini" and "kei" vehicles that were specific to Honda Primo were "badge engineered" and sold at the other two sales channels, thereby providing smaller vehicles that sold better at both Honda Verno and Honda Clio locations. As of March 2006, the three sales chains were discontinued, with the establishment of Honda Cars dealerships. While the network was disbanded, some Japanese Honda dealerships still use the network names, offering all Japanese market Honda cars at all locations.

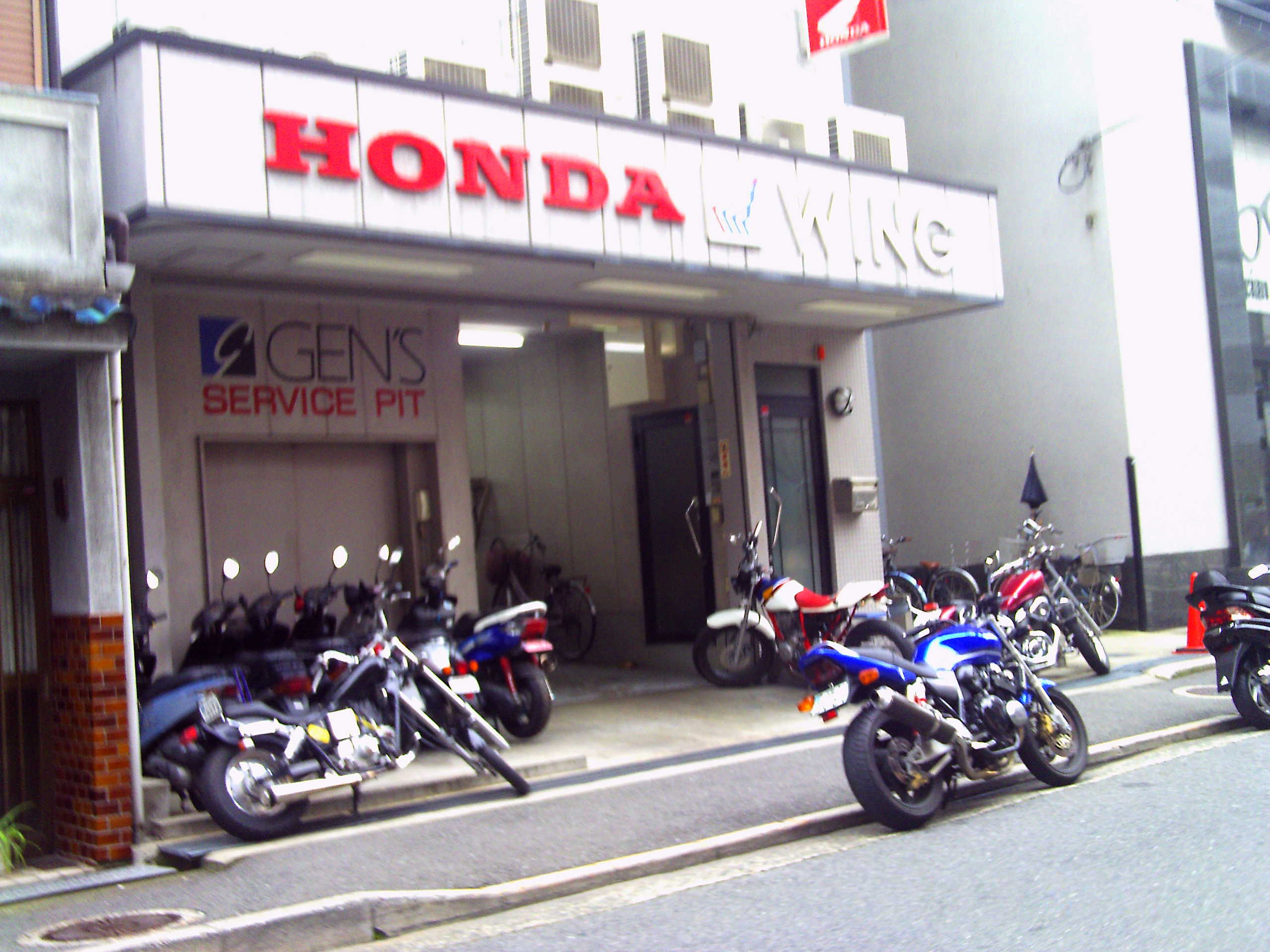
Honda Wing motorcycle dealership (Japan)

Honda sells genuine accessories through a separate retail chain called Honda Access for both its motorcycle, scooter, and automobile products. In cooperation with corporate group partner Pioneer, Honda sells an aftermarket line of audio and in-car navigation equipment that can be installed in any vehicle under the brand name Gathers, which is available at Honda Access locations as well as Japanese auto parts retailers, such as Autobacs. Buyers of used vehicles are directed to a specific Honda retail chain that sells only used vehicles called Honda Auto Terrace.

In the spring of 2012, Honda in Japan introduced Honda Cars Small Store which is devoted to compact cars like the Honda Fit, and kei vehicles like the Honda N-One and Honda S660 roadster.

Starting in 2023, Honda plain implement a regional dealer merger similar to those of other manufacturers at its directly managed dealerships. First, on 1 April 2024, multiple directly managed dealerships in the North Kanto, Chubu, Kinki, and Chugoku-Shikoku regions were merged into one company through cross-border mergers, and the merged and renamed to Honda Mobility (name of region).

== List of models sold in the retail channels ==
All cars sold at Honda Verno

- Prelude, Integra, CR-X, Vigor, Saber, Ballade, Quint, Crossroad, Element, NSX, HR-V, Mobilio Spike, S2000, CR-V, That's, MDX, Rafaga, Capa, and the Torneo

All cars sold at Honda Clio

- Accord, Legend, Inspire, Avancier, S-MX, Lagreat, Stepwgn, Elysion, Stream, Odyssey (int'l), Domani, Concerto, Accord Tourer, Logo, Fit, Insight, That's, Mobilio, and the City

All cars sold at Honda Primo

- Civic, Life, Acty, Vamos, Hobio, Ascot, Ascot Innova, Torneo, Civic Ferio, Freed, Mobilio, Orthia, Capa, Today, Z, and the Beat

== See also ==
- Toyota dealerships (Japan)
