= Honda Accord (sixth generation) =

The sixth-generation Honda Accord was available as a four-door sedan, a two-door coupe, five-door hatch (Europe only) and station wagon (Japan only) and was produced by Honda from September 1997 (for the 1998 model year) until 2002 and from 1998 to 2003 in Europe.

== Background ==
For the sixth generation, Honda split the Accord into three separate models, designed for the Japanese, North American, and European markets. However, the wagon was discontinued in North America while the coupe was discontinued in Japan. This generation also spawned two distinctively branded performance versions for European and Japanese domestic markets, dubbed Type R and Euro R, respectively.

On the origin of these models, it is rumored that with the advent of the sixth generation Accord, "Honda England were let loose to build a car that would compete with Subaru and Mitsubishi's Evo. They came up with the Accord Type R, a lightened (around 1200 kg) track version with no sound deadening or luxuries". Honda Japan followed suit in 2000, "took the Accord Type R and developed the Accord Euro R (hence the 'Euro'pean tag)" which has a similar chassis, suspension that is interchangeable with the European model, same engine (slightly detuned for European Type R), and nearly identical interior trim.

== Japan ==
Sixth generation series Japan
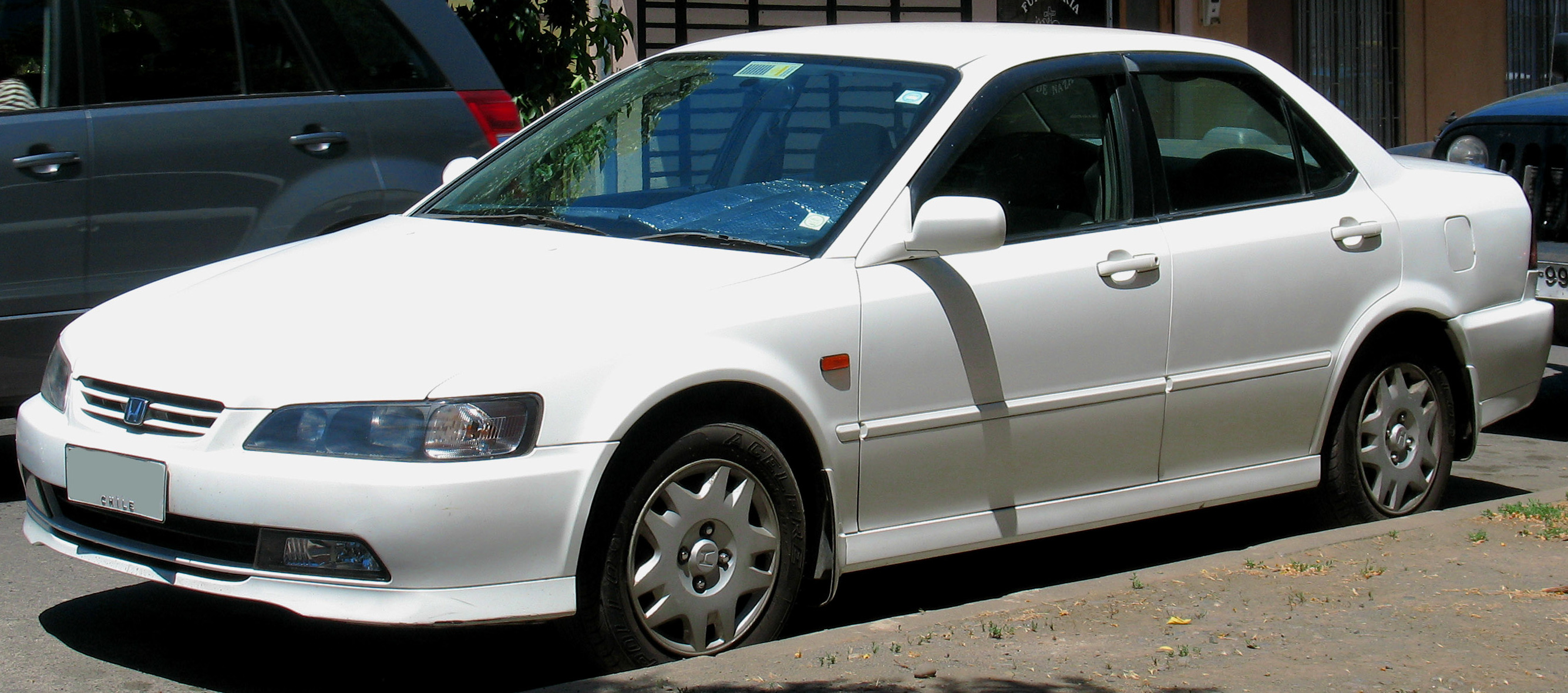
- Japanese market Accord sedan (pre-facelift)

Overview
- Model code: CF3; CF4; CF5; CL2; CL3
- Also called: Isuzu Aska
- Production: September 1997 – 2002
- Assembly: Sayama, Saitama, Japan
- Designer: Toshihiko Shimizu; Gen Tamura (1995)

Body and chassis
- Class: Mid-size car
- Body style: 4-door sedan 5-door wagon
- Layout: Front-engine, front-wheel-drive Front-engine, four-wheel-drive
- Related: Honda Torneo

Powertrain
- Engine: Gasoline: 1.8 L F18B2 SOHC VTEC I4; 2.0 L F20A DOHC VTEC I4; 2.0 L F20B DOHC VTEC I4; 2.2 L H22A DOHC VTEC I4; 2.3 L H23A DOHC VTEC I4

Dimensions
- Wheelbase: 2,665 mm (104.9 in)
- Length: 4,635 mm (182.5 in) (sedan & wagon)
- Width: 1,695 mm (66.7 in) (sedan); 1,720 mm (67.7 in) (wagon)
- Height: 1,420 mm (55.9 in) (sedan); 1,440 mm (56.7 in) (wagon)
- Curb weight: 1,230 kg (2,712 lb) (sedan); 1,330 kg (2,932 lb) (wagon)

Chronology
- Predecessor: Honda Accord (fifth generation) (CD3/4/5/6/7/9; Japan)
- Successor: Honda Accord (Japan and Europe seventh generation)

=== Mass market ===
The Japanese models, introduced on September 4, 1997, became narrower than the previous generation, returning to the favorable compact car tax bracket, except for Euro R and wagon, which were classified as the larger mid-sized classification. A nearly identical related car, the Honda Torneo, replaced the previous Honda Ascot and the Honda Rafaga in Japan, which was sold at both Honda Verno and Honda Primo Japanese dealerships, while the Accord remained at Honda Clio locations. This was the last generation that was badge engineered as the Isuzu Aska.

When the previous-generation Accord grew in exterior dimensions, this reclassified the Accord as a mid-size car in Japan. The second-generation Honda Inspire was manufactured in two platforms, with the smaller G20A five-cylinder engine installed in a shorter and narrower sedan that complied with "compact" regulations. This effort reflected Honda's positioning of Honda Clio as a luxury car dealership that sold the luxury sedans Honda Legend and Honda Inspire, similar to their efforts in North America with the Acura brand. Honda continued to offer the Accord station wagon in Japan. All trim levels sold in Japan were available with Honda's newly created, internet-based telematics service called Internavi.

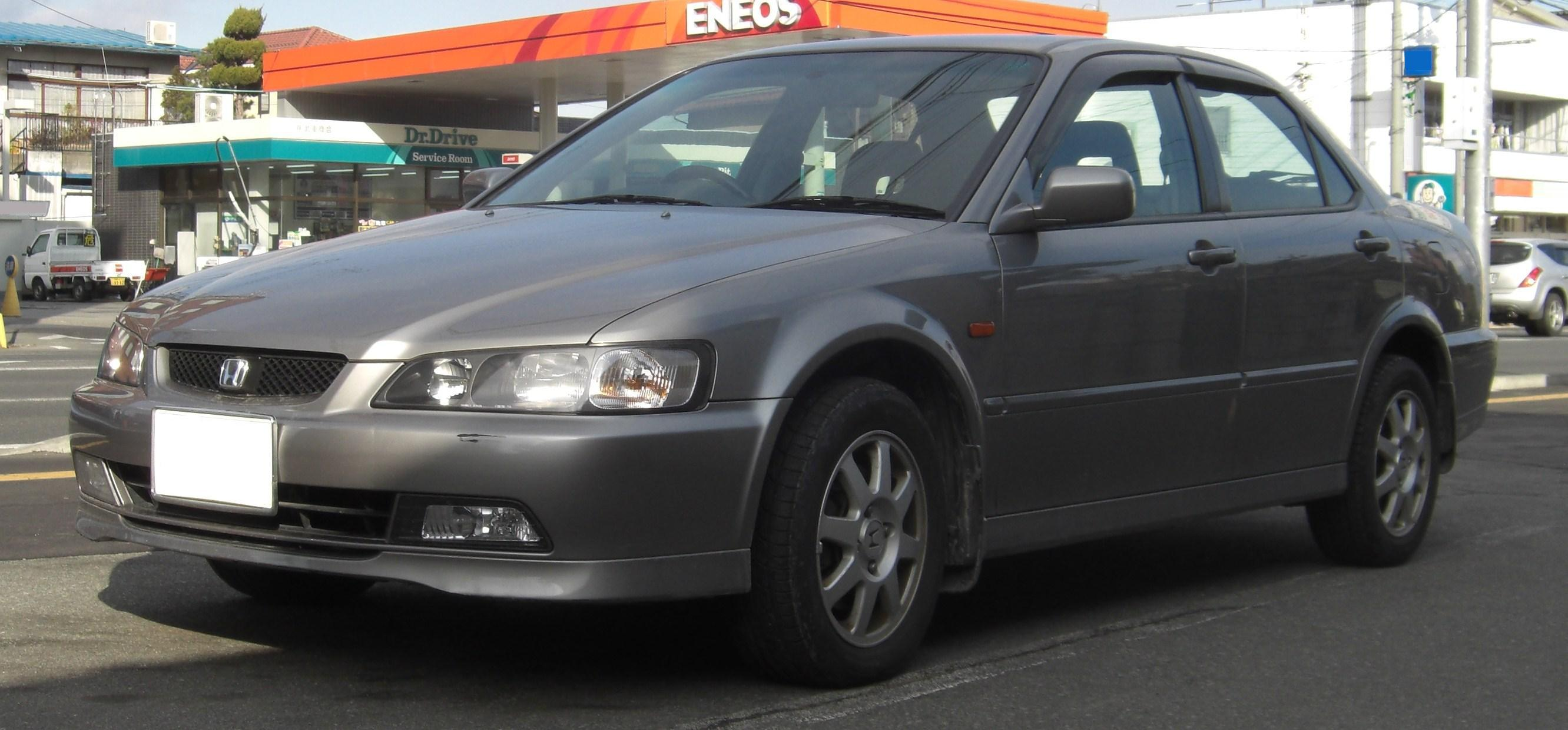
Accord 2.0 VTS 4WD (pre-facelift)

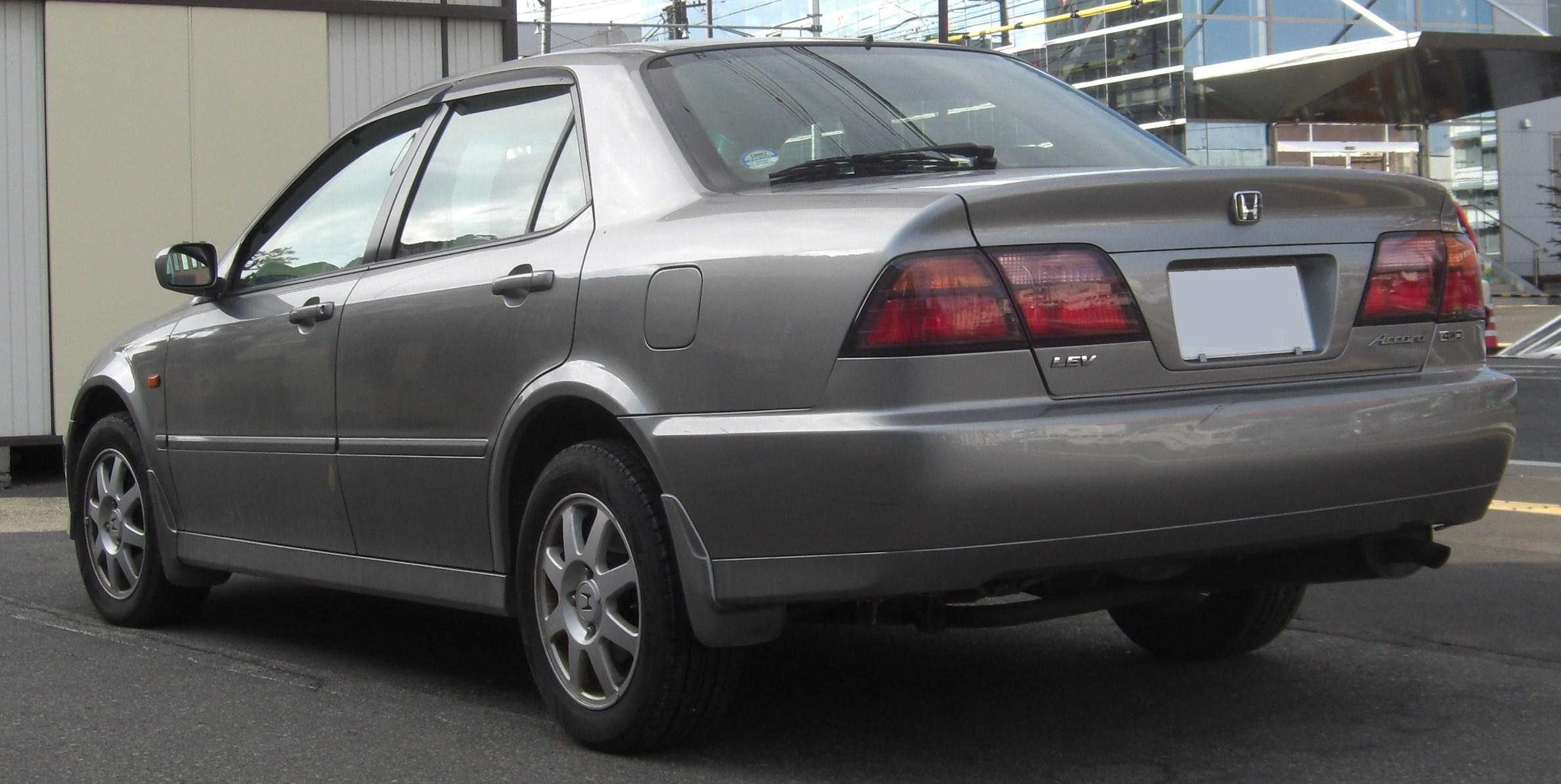
Accord 2.0 VTS 4WD (pre-facelift)

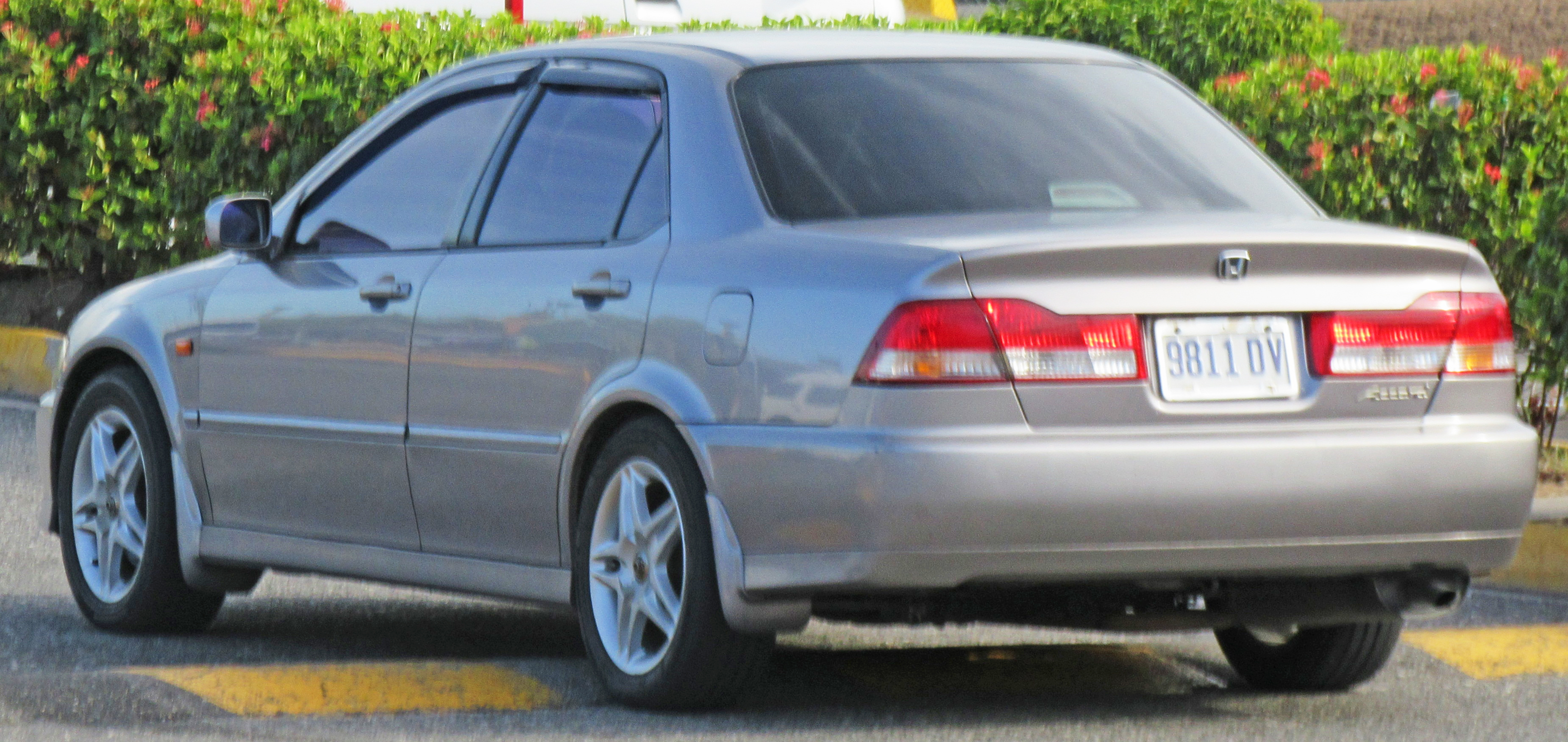
Japanese market Accord sedan (facelift)

=== Performance models ===
==== Accord SiR/SiR-T (model code CF4, 1997) ====
Introduced in 1997, the SiR-T model was only available with a five-speed manual transmission and the 2.0-litre F20B engine rated 200 PS (147 kW; 197 hp) at 7,200 rpm and 196 N⋅m (145 lb⋅ft) at 6,600 rpm. The F20B engine has an 11.0.1 compression ratio, 85 mm X 88 mm bore and stroke, and a 7400 rpm redline. The H-series DOHC VTEC engines were limited to 7,800 rpm. The F20B had a unique blue valve cover and like all the larger displacement Honda engines, the F20B was mounted with a tilt towards the driver. F20B engines could rev at higher rpms than H22As because it had a shorter stroke. The F20B had an 85 mm x 88 mm bore and stroke when compared to an H22A which had an 87 mm x 90.7 mm bore and stroke. The F20B was also classified as a low emissions engine. The SiR-T was replaced by the even more uncompromising Euro R variant in 2000, whereas the automatic-equipped SiR continued to be available until this generation was replaced in 2002.

The Accord SiR was based on the SiR-T, but used the S-Matic automatic transmission with sequential manual shift mode. The maximum output of this version was reduced to 180 PS (132 kW; 178 hp) at 7000 rpm and 192 N⋅m (142 lb⋅ft) at 5,500 rpm. Moving the gear-stick over to the right allowed manual selection of 1st, 2nd, 3rd or 4th gear using up and down shift actions just like the sequential gearboxes used on the JGTC NSX. When a particular gear is selected, the gear stays in position at all rpm. When pushed against the rev limiter, the engine would bounce against it just like a manual. However, the gear ratios for each gear were the same as the normal mode. The transmission still worked like a normal automatic transmission in all other operating modes.

==== Accord Wagon SiR (CH9 FWD, 1999–2001; CL2 AWD, 2000–2001) ====
The SiR wagon model included the only 2.3-liter H23A DOHC VTEC H-series engine in the Honda line-up. The H23A engine was rated at 200 hp / 190 hp (AWD) at 6,800 rpm and torque of 162.8 lb⋅ft (220.7 N⋅m) at 5,300 rpm, 10.6:1 compression, 87 mm (3.4 in) X 95 mm (3.7 in) bore and stroke, and a 7,200 rpm redline which is slightly lower than other H-series VTEC engines from factory. The H23A also came with a blue valve cover and was the largest displacement of the H-series Honda engines. The H23A was mounted with a tilt towards the driver. The H23A had a longer stroke than the H22A. Specifications for the H23A were; 87 mm (3.4 in) X 95 mm (3.7 in) bore and stroke and H22A has 87 mm (3.4 in) X 90.7 mm (3.6 in) bore and stroke. The H23A had better acceleration because the peak torque occurred sooner at lower rpm when compared to the H22A.

==== Accord/Torneo Euro R (CL1, 2000–2002) ====
The Euro R included a "red top" variation of H22A engine producing 220 PS (162 kW; 217 hp) at 7,200 rpm & 163 ft⋅lbf (221 N⋅m) at 6,500 rpm, 5-speed T2W4 manual transmission with helical Torsen LSD, Recaro seats, leather-wrapped MOMO steering wheel, sports suspension, sports exhaust (including 4–2–1 stainless headers) and an aluminum-alloy gear shift knob. It was also fitted with a unique factory body kit that included flares and was available in some colors not available to other Accords (such as Milano Red). The Accord (sold at Honda Clio locations) and the Torneo (sold at Honda Verno and Primo locations) are the same car, aside from minor cosmetic differences in the exterior, most notably front of the car.

The 2002 model was named the Euro-Rx. This model came with a few slight modifications from the 2000/2001 model. These included factory rear privacy glass, a titanium gear knob, optional Red-checker interior (original gold-checker) and bronze coloured alloy wheels. The high-stop spoiler also became standard on all models. Honda also addressed two common issues that had become apparent. The ECU was upgraded to resolve the issue of cold-starts causing hesitation on acceleration and the gearbox syncros were upgraded to a higher quality alloy to lengthen their lifespan.

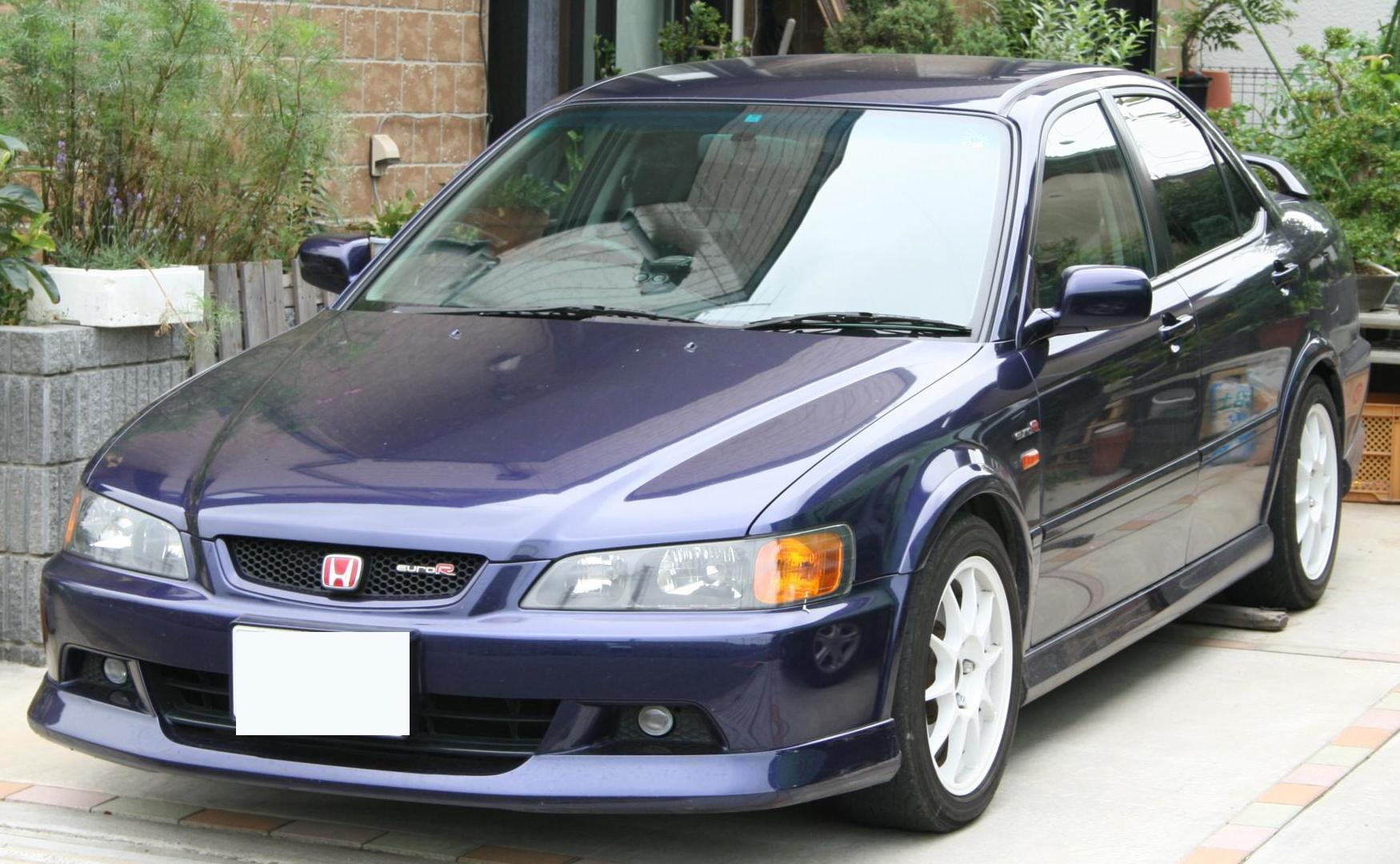
Accord Euro R (CL1)

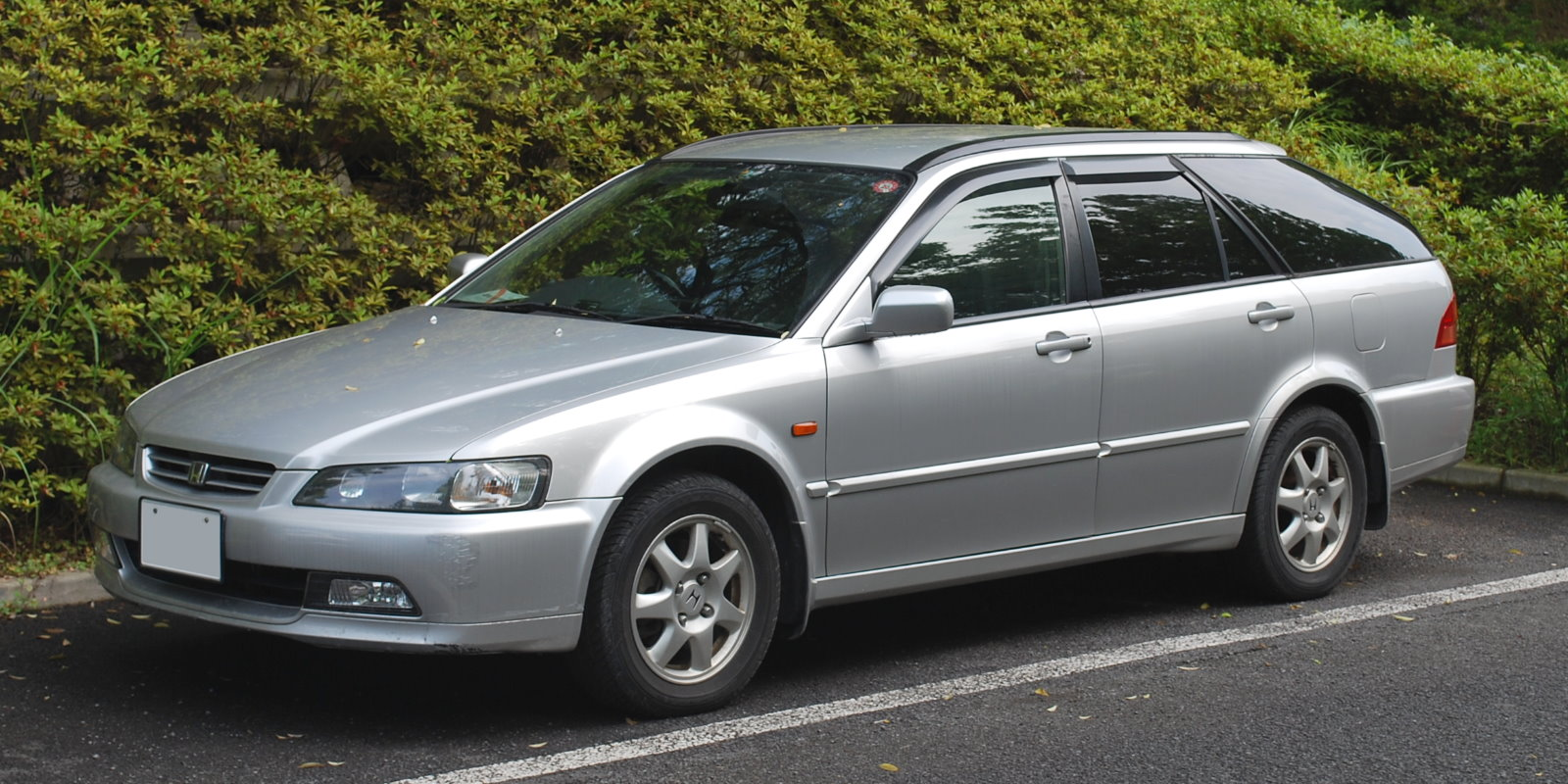
Japanese market 1997 Accord wagon (pre-facelift)

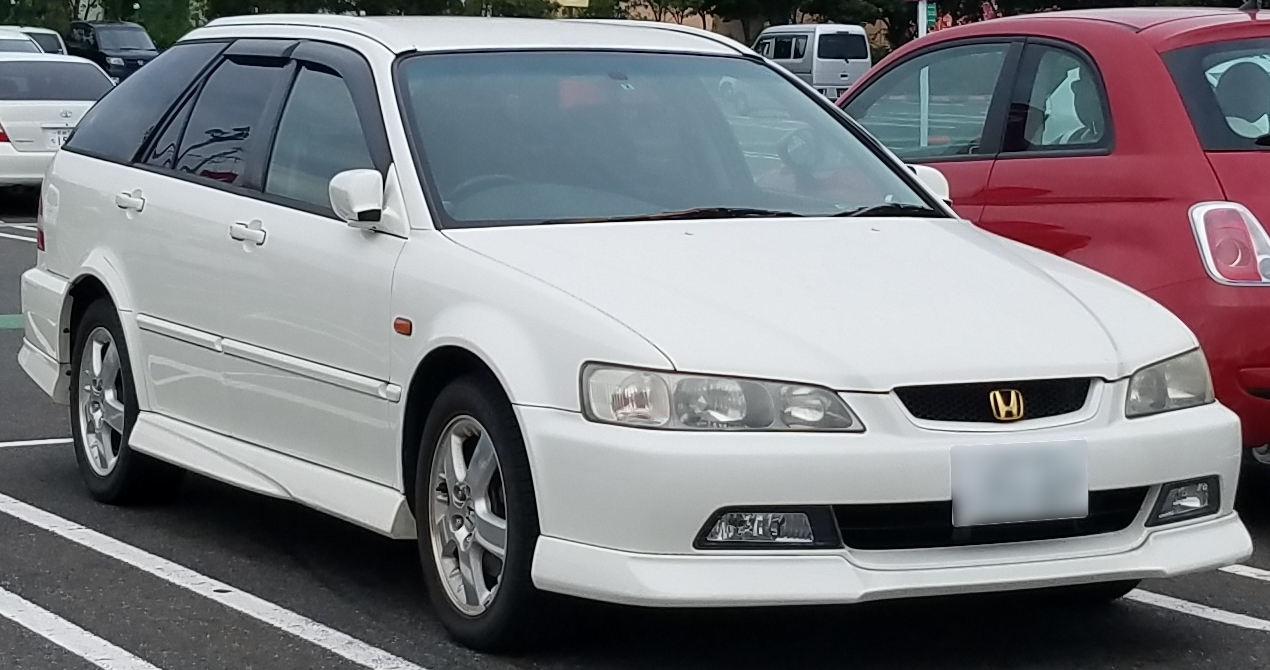
Accord Wagon SiR Sportier (facelift)

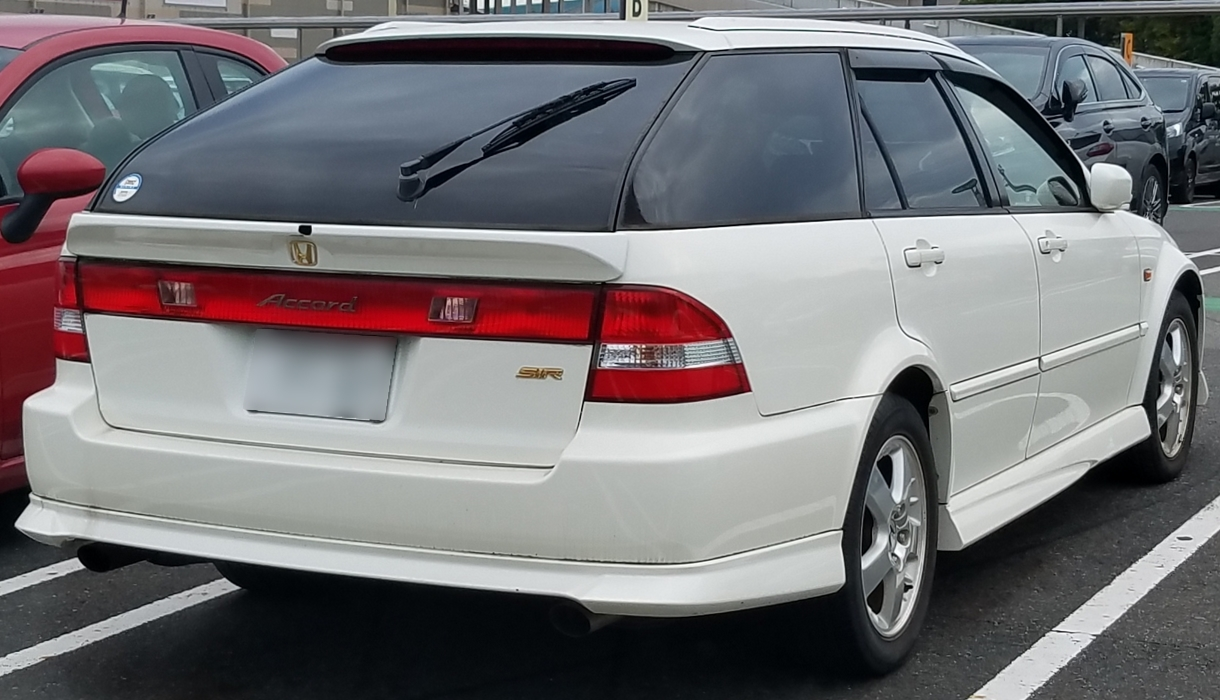
Accord Wagon SiR Sportier (facelift; rear view)

== Americas, Australia, New Zealand and Southeast Asia ==
Sixth generation North America and Asia Pacific
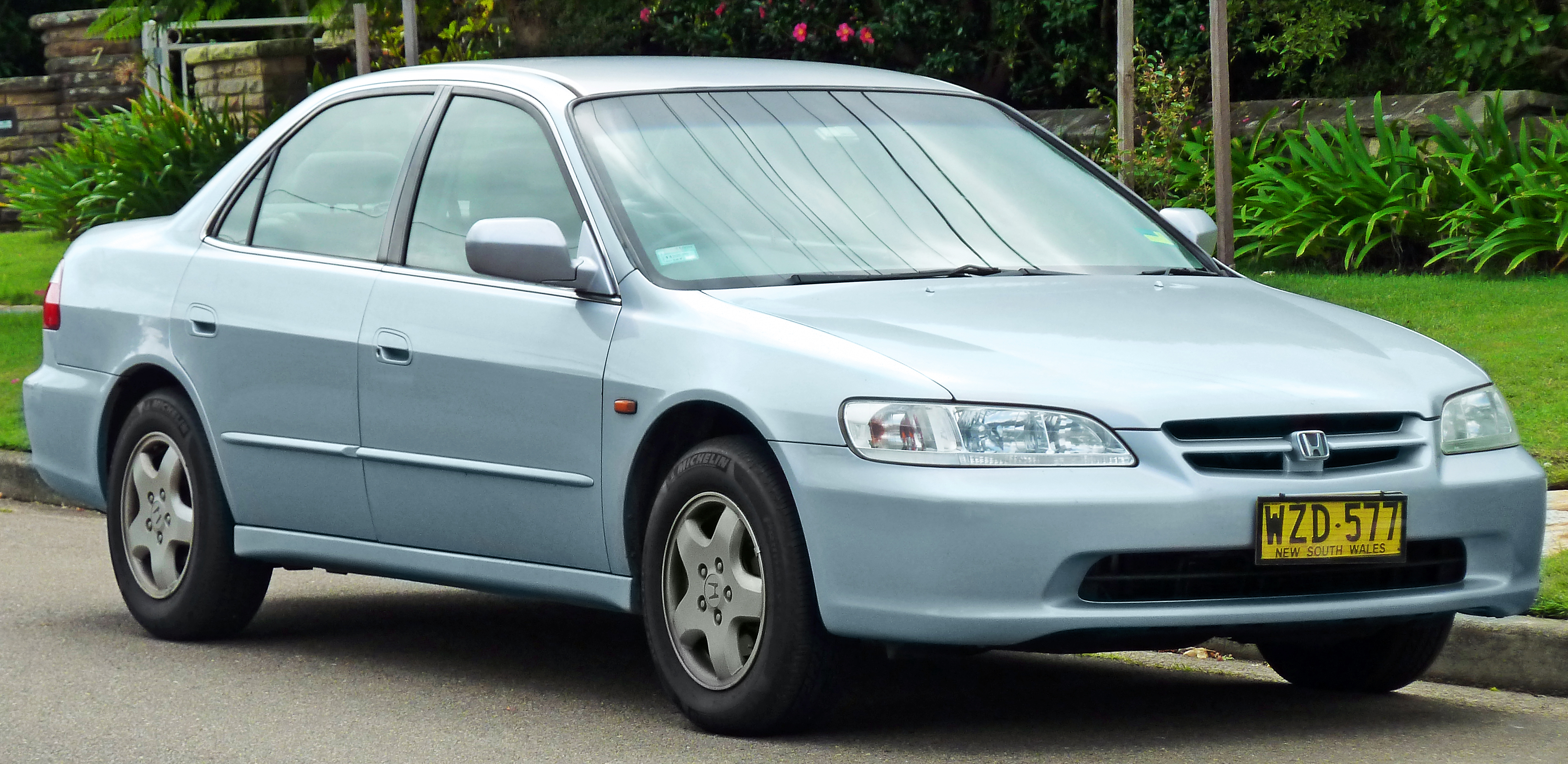
- 1997–2001 Honda Accord V6 sedan (Australia; pre-facelift)

Overview
- Model code: CF8; CG1; CG2; CG3; CG4; CG5; CG6
- Production: August 1997 – August 2002 (sedan); September 1997 – 2002 (coupe)
- Model years: 1998–2002
- Assembly: Marysville, Ohio (Marysville Auto Plant); Jalisco, Mexico (Honda de México); Sayama, Japan; Guangzhou, China; Hsinchu, Taiwan; Santa Rosa City, Philippines; Ayutthaya, Thailand; Alor Gajah, Malaysia; North Jakarta, Indonesia; Greater Noida, India; Nelson, New Zealand (1998–2001)
- Designer: Shinji Takashima; Toshihiko Shimizu (sedan: 1995); Don Herner; Eric Schumaker (coupe: 1995)

Body and chassis
- Class: Mid-size car
- Body style: 4-door sedan (US body, chassis no. CF8/CG1/CG5/CG6); 2-door coupe (US body, chassis no. CG2/CG3/CG4, North America only)
- Layout: Front-engine, front-wheel-drive
- Related: Acura CL; Acura TL; Honda Inspire

Powertrain
- Engine: Gasoline: 2.0 L F20B5 SOHC VTEC I4; 2.3 L F23A1/A4/A5 SOHC VTEC I4; 3.0 L J30A1 SOHC i-VTEC V6
- Transmission: 4-speed automatic 5-speed manual

Dimensions
- Wheelbase: Sedan: 2,715 mm (106.9 in); Coupe: 2,670 mm (105.1 in)
- Length: 1998–2000 Sedan: 4,796 mm (188.8 in); 2001–02 Sedan: 4,811 mm (189.4 in); 1998–2002 Coupe: 4,745 mm (186.8 in)
- Width: 1,786 mm (70.3 in)
- Height: 1998–2002 Sedan: 1,445 mm (56.9 in); 1998–2002 V6 Sedan: 1,455 mm (57.3 in); 1998–2000 Coupe: 1,400 mm (55.1 in); 2001–02 Coupe: 1,394 mm (54.9 in); 2001–02 V6 Coupe: 1,405 mm (55.3 in)
- Curb weight: 1,451 kg (3,200 lb) - V6; 1,310 kg (2,888 lb) - 4 cylinder non-VTEC; 1,335 kg (2,943 lb) - 4 cylinder VTEC

Chronology
- Predecessor: Honda Accord (fifth generation) (CD3/4/5/6/7/9; North America and Asia Pacific)
- Successor: Honda Accord (North America seventh generation)

The American Accord was only available in sedan and coupe form, becoming the largest Accord to date, sharing a platform with the Japanese market Honda Inspire/Acura TL. While previous generations of the Accord Coupe had very similar exterior styling that made it a two-door version of the contemporary Accord four-door sedan, the 1998 Coupe was the first to be given an exclusive front fascia, rear tail lights (which resemble those found on the NSX), wheels, and other unique body panels not shared with the sedan, and was now marketed as a somewhat separate series, the "Accord Coupe", to set it away from the more family-oriented sedan. This differentiation enabled the Coupe, which was exported to other markets, to fit in more easily with the local Accord versions. The tail light appearance was duplicated on the Japanese market Honda Domani for the second generation of production. The coupe's design was styled by Don Herner and directed by lead designer Eric Schumaker into August 1995 in Torrance, CA. It was later scanned as a clay model and transferred to engineering in August 1995 at Honda R&D in Raymond, Ohio. It was developed by Honda engineer Laura Minor into production form until January 1996, being then developed into prototypes for testing.

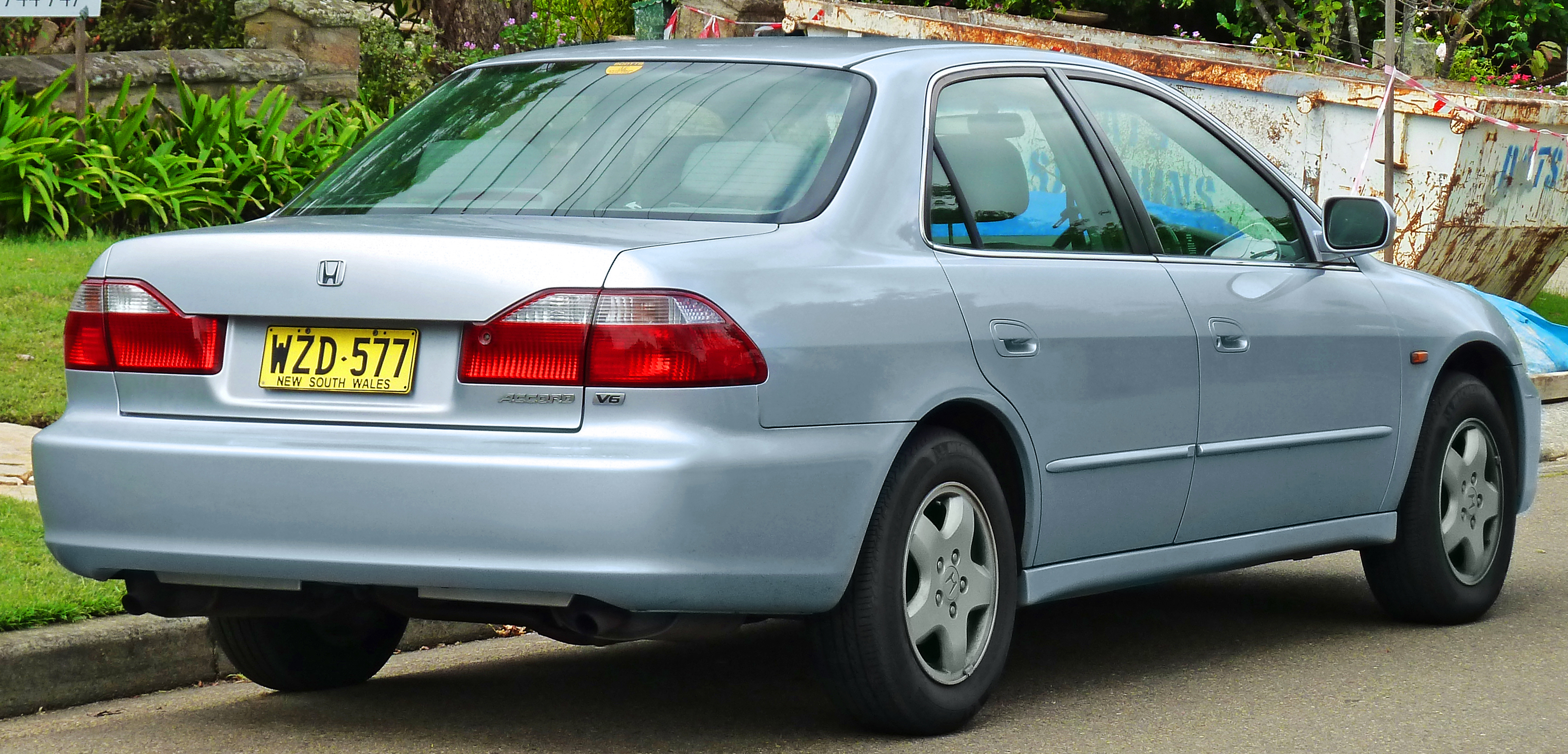
1997–2001 Accord V6 sedan (Australia; pre-facelift)

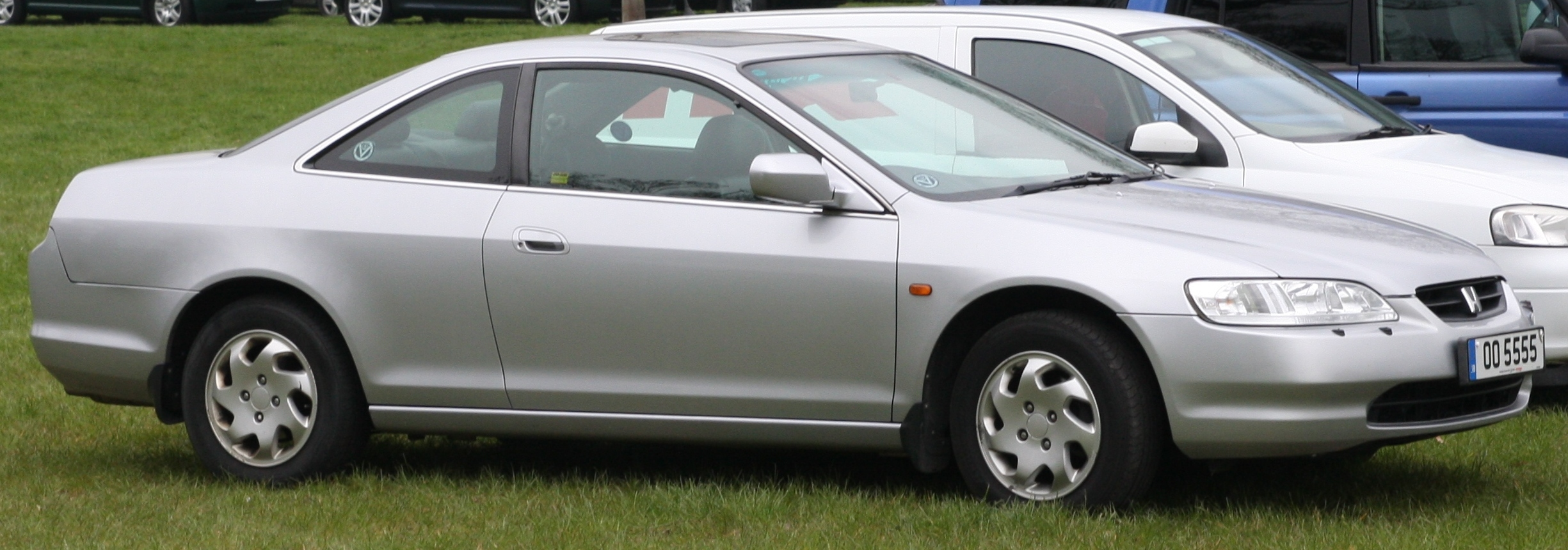

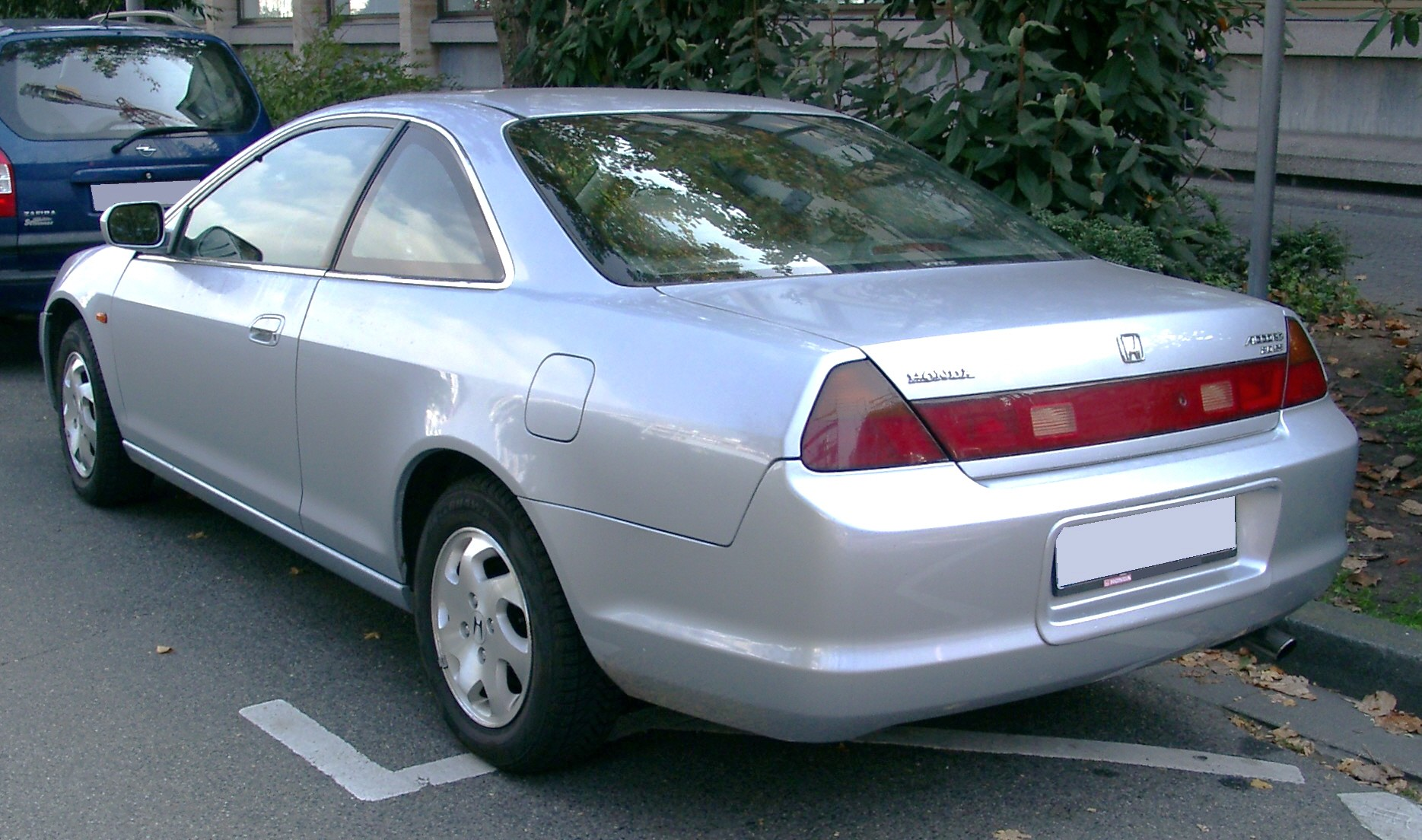
Accord coupe (Europe; pre-facelift)

Starting with this generation, cabin air filters (also known as pollen filters) were installed as standard equipment and are located behind the glove compartment internationally.

F/G development began in January 1993 (during final development of the CD), with design work starting later that year. A design for the sedan by Shinji Takashima and Toshihiko Shimizu was chosen in January 1995 and later frozen for production by the middle of 1995. Prototype test mules were tested from mid-1995 in CD Accord body panels, with full body prototypes being used from 1996. Design patents were filed on March 8, 1996, with development ending in March 1997. Sedan mass production began in August 1997, with customers deliveries starting on September 23, 1997. Coupe production began in September 1997, going on sale on November 4, 1997.

For the 1998 model year, the sedan was offered in DX, LX, LX-V6, EX and EX-V6 trims, while the Accord Coupe was offered only in LX, LX-V6, EX and EX-V6 trims. The DX model was fitted with a 2.3L I4 non-VTEC engine rated at 135 bhp (101 kW), while the LX and EX included a 2.3L I4 VTEC engine rated at 150 bhp (110 kW). All 4-cylinder models, except for the "SE", came with a 5-speed manual transmission standard, and with a four-speed automatic as optional equipment. The SE was only available with the automatic transmission. The DX remained the value-oriented trim with no audio system, manual windows, manual locks, no cruise control, rear drum brakes and 14-inch steel wheels. The DX Value Package added a radio-cassette player, air conditioning and cruise control; this was known as the Accord DX in Canada where it was the base model of the lineup. The LX trim added power windows, power locks, door courtesy lights and 15-inch steel wheels; the SE (Special Edition) package available for the 2000 and 2002 model years added 15-inch alloy wheels and optional leather trim, but was only available with the 4-speed automatic. The EX trim added a CD player, power moonroof, ABS, alloy wheels, keyless entry, rear disc brakes and upgraded cloth. For the first time, optional leather seating arrives to the Accord EX trim. All V6 sedan and coupe models received the 3.0-liter V6 SOHC VTEC engine rated at 200 bhp (149 kW) and 195 lb⋅ft (264 N⋅m) (derived straight from the Acura 3.0 CL), ABS and automatic transmission. Some dealer-installed options included: gold finish kit, gold finish exhaust tip(s), gold finish wheel center caps, 6-disc in-dash CD changer, tape deck, fog lights, wing spoiler, alarm system, car cover and accessory chrome wheels and had standard leather seats with an 8-way power driver seat.

In Australia, the sixth-generation Accord went on sale in December 1997, and was initially imported from the United States. However, in 1999, the Accord became the first Honda in Australia to be imported from Thailand. In March 2001, the Accord received a facelift, while at the same time, the option of a manual transmission was dropped. New colour choices with the facelift included Naples Gold, Signet Silver and Nighthawk Black, the first time that black was offered in an Australian market Accord.

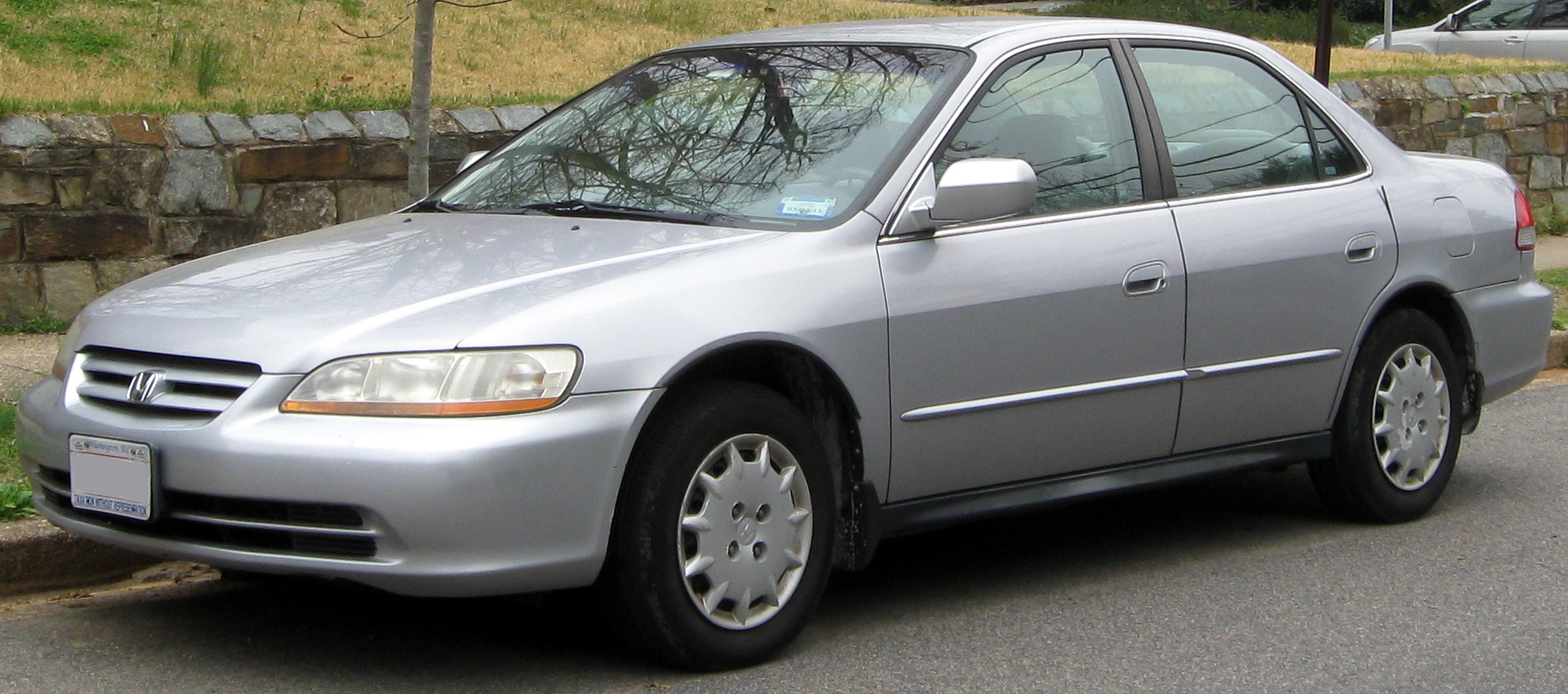
2001–2002 Accord LX sedan (U.S.; facelift)

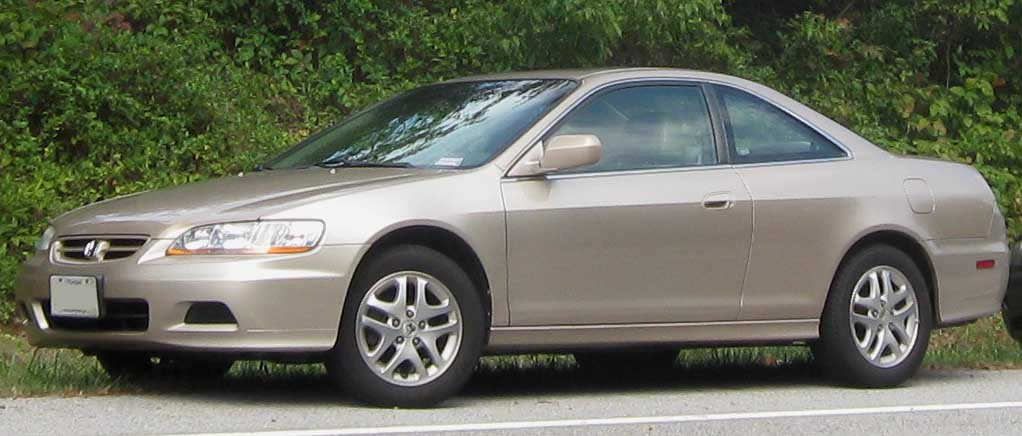
2001–2002 Accord EX-V6 coupe (U.S.; facelift)

In September 2000, the American-market Accord sedan and coupe received a minor facelift. A new front fascia, rear bumper, sideskirt alteration, new taillights and wheel designs freshened the Accord's look. The interior saw minimal changes apart from some fabric and audio configuration changes. The LX and LX-V6 now included a standard CD player, and the EX four-cylinder now included a 6-disc in-dash CD changer with cassette player while the EX-V6 offered that stereo plus automatic climate control. All V6 models also included a traction control system that could be disabled by a switch, the first Accord to have such a system included. The Special Edition returned to the coupe and sedan models for its final model year, 2002. It included all the features of the LX, but added exclusive alloy wheels, keyless entry and a single CD/cassette radio. In the Philippines, only the sedan was available and offered in VTi and VTi-L trims. The VTi model was fitted with a 2.0L I4 VTEC engine rated at 152 bhp (113 kW) while the top VTi-L trim was fitted with a 2.3L I4 VTEC engine rated at 157 bhp (117 kW). Both models are available with either a 5-speed manual transmission or a 4-speed automatic transmission.

Honda made the decision to continue this generation of Accord one year longer than usual. Previously, the Accord ran four years on a single body-style and facelift before being redesigned. As with many Japanese cars, the typical Accord generation cycle was a 2:4 trend, with a newly released model running for years one and two unaltered, then getting a facelift for years three and four before a major redesign. This generation onwards would run a total of five years, with the facelift occurring for the fourth year. Accord sales remained steady despite the additional year.

Despite the Accord's reputation for reliability, the V6 models were plagued by transmission failures and prompted class action lawsuits against the company (four-cylinder models were also affected, but not to the same extent). No formal recall occurred in the US, but Honda did extend the warranties for the 2000 and 2001 models to seven years or 109,000 miles (175,000 km). 1998, 1999, and 2002 cars were considered for extended coverage on a case-by-case basis. In Canada, recall letters were sent out to owners who fell within a certain VIN range; this warranty was later re-extended for some owners to seven years in length.

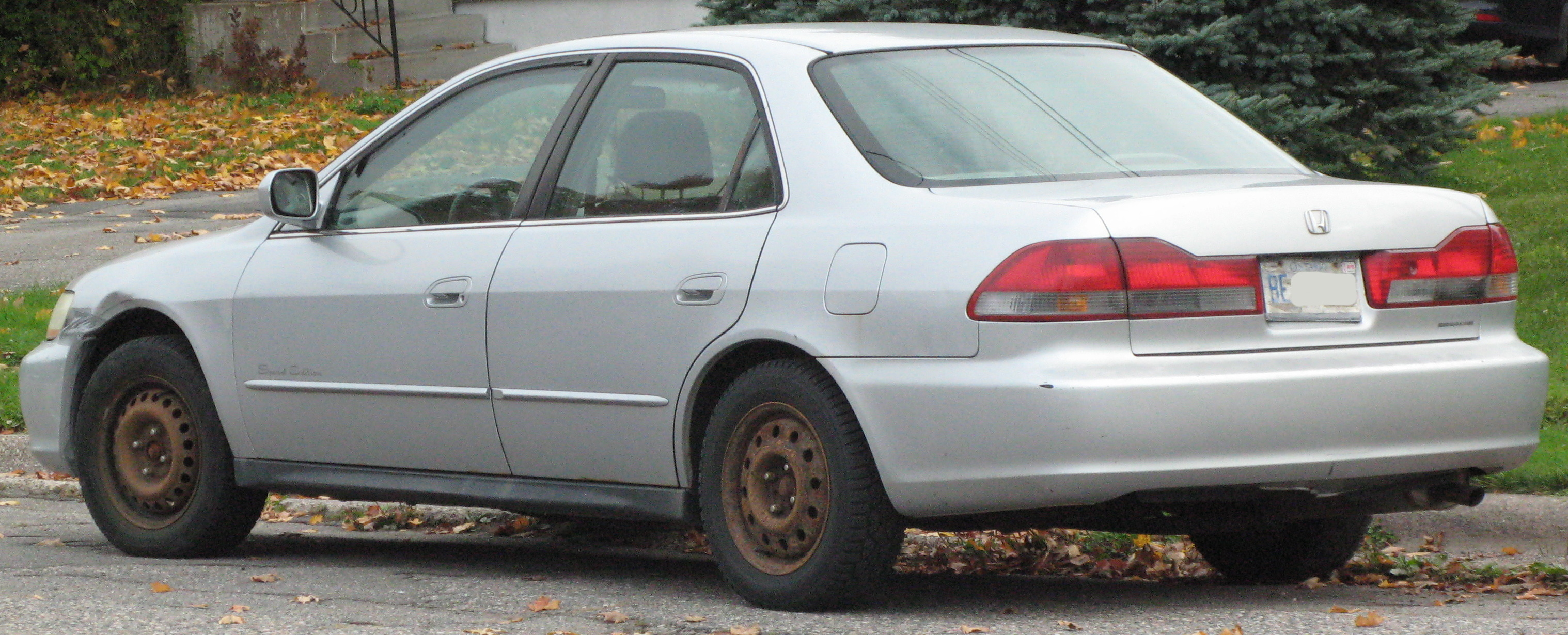
2002 Accord Special Edition (Canada; facelift)

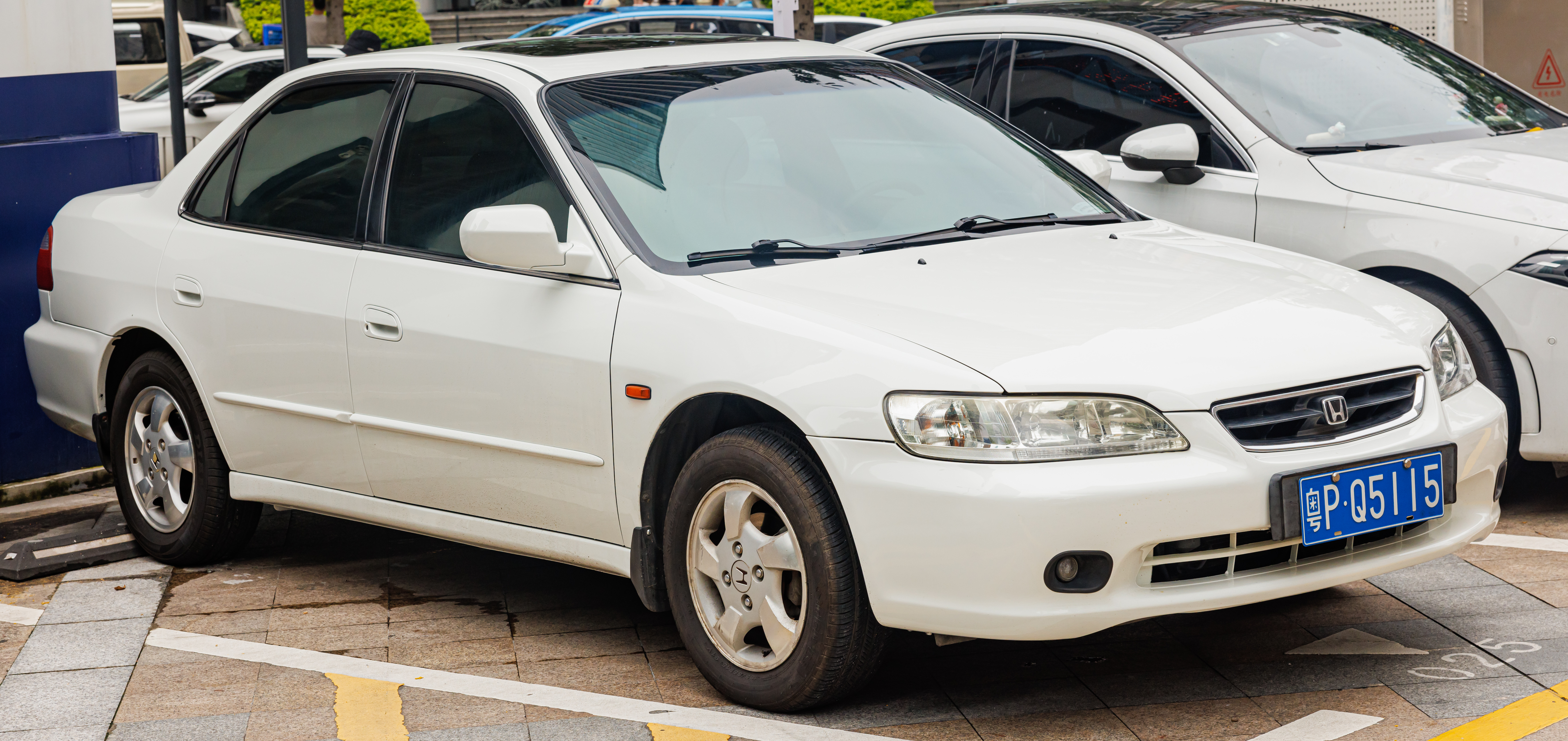
Honda Accord (China)

Beginning in 1997 at launch, Accord keys were equipped with immobilizer microchips. In late 1998, for the 1999 model year, the Accord was equipped with foldable mirrors. For 2001, the DX Value Package was added, and the Special Edition was reintroduced for 2002 models.

The 1998 Accord was also assembled in New Zealand at the very end of overall CKD car production due to the abolition of import tariffs on built cars which made local assembly uneconomic. 1,200 examples of the car (the mid-sized U.S. sedan version) were built before the Honda New Zealand factory was closed; (the very first Honda-owned factory operation to be closed down) and the equipment (which included a paint shop acquired from Nissan when that automaker closed its Australian manufacturing unit in 1994) was shipped to other Honda assembly units, mainly in Asia. Small numbers of Accords were imported (right hand drive) from the U.S. before sourcing switched to Thailand once Accord assembly began there. The Thai factory continues to supply New Zealand with the latest generation Accord and now also ships that line and other Honda models to Australia and elsewhere in Southeast Asia.

Concerns over airbag safety plagued the Japanese automaker. The company announced it was recalling vehicles citing driver's airbags that deploy with too much force during collisions. Honda says 2,430 faulty airbags were installed as repairs to customer vehicles after a collision. But since the company cannot accurately track down which Honda received the flawed airbags, Honda broadened its search to include– 2001 and 2002 Accords. Since November 2008, Honda has recalled some 1.7 million of its cars for airbag concerns. At its last similar expanded recall in February 2010, Honda said the too-powerful airbags have been involved in 12 incidents, including one fatality. As of February 2018, 24 deaths and 240 injuries have been attributed to Takata Airbags worldwide. The NHTSA has 37 million vehicles under recall for their replacement.

== Europe ==
Sixth generation Europe
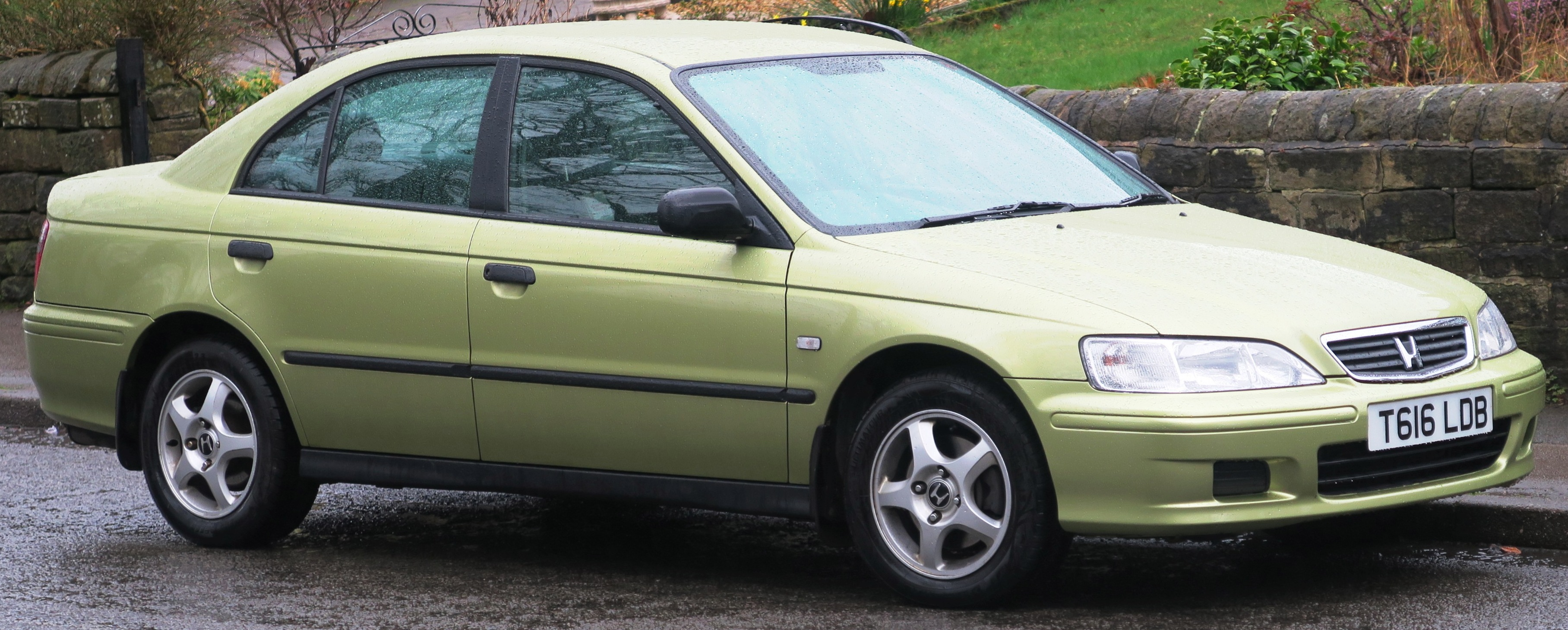
- European-spec Accord Saloon (pre-facelift)

Overview
- Model code: CG7; CG8; CG9; CH1; CH5; CH6; CH7; CH8
- Production: 1998–2002
- Assembly: Swindon, United Kingdom (HUKM)

Body and chassis
- Class: Large family car
- Body style: 4-door sedan; 5-door hatchback
- Layout: Front-engine, front-wheel-drive
- Related: Honda Ascot Innova; Rover 600

Powertrain
- Engine: Gasoline: 1.6 L D16B6 SOHC VTEC I4; 1.8 L F18B2 SOHC VTEC I4; 2.0 L F20B DOHC VTEC I4; 2.2 L F22B1 SOHC VTEC I4; 2.2 L H22A7 DOHC VTEC I4; 2.3 L F23Z5 SOHC VTEC I4; 2.3 L H23A DOHC VTEC I4; Diesel: 2.0 L Rover 20T2N I4 (turbo intercooler)

Dimensions
- Wheelbase: 2,670 mm (105.1 in)
- Length: 4,595 mm (180.9 in) (sedan)
- Width: 1,750 mm (68.9 in) (sedan)
- Height: 1,405 mm (55.3 in) (sedan)
- Curb weight: 1,235 kg (2,723 lb) (sedan)

Chronology
- Predecessor: Honda Accord (fifth generation) (Europe)
- Successor: Honda Accord (Japan and Europe seventh generation)

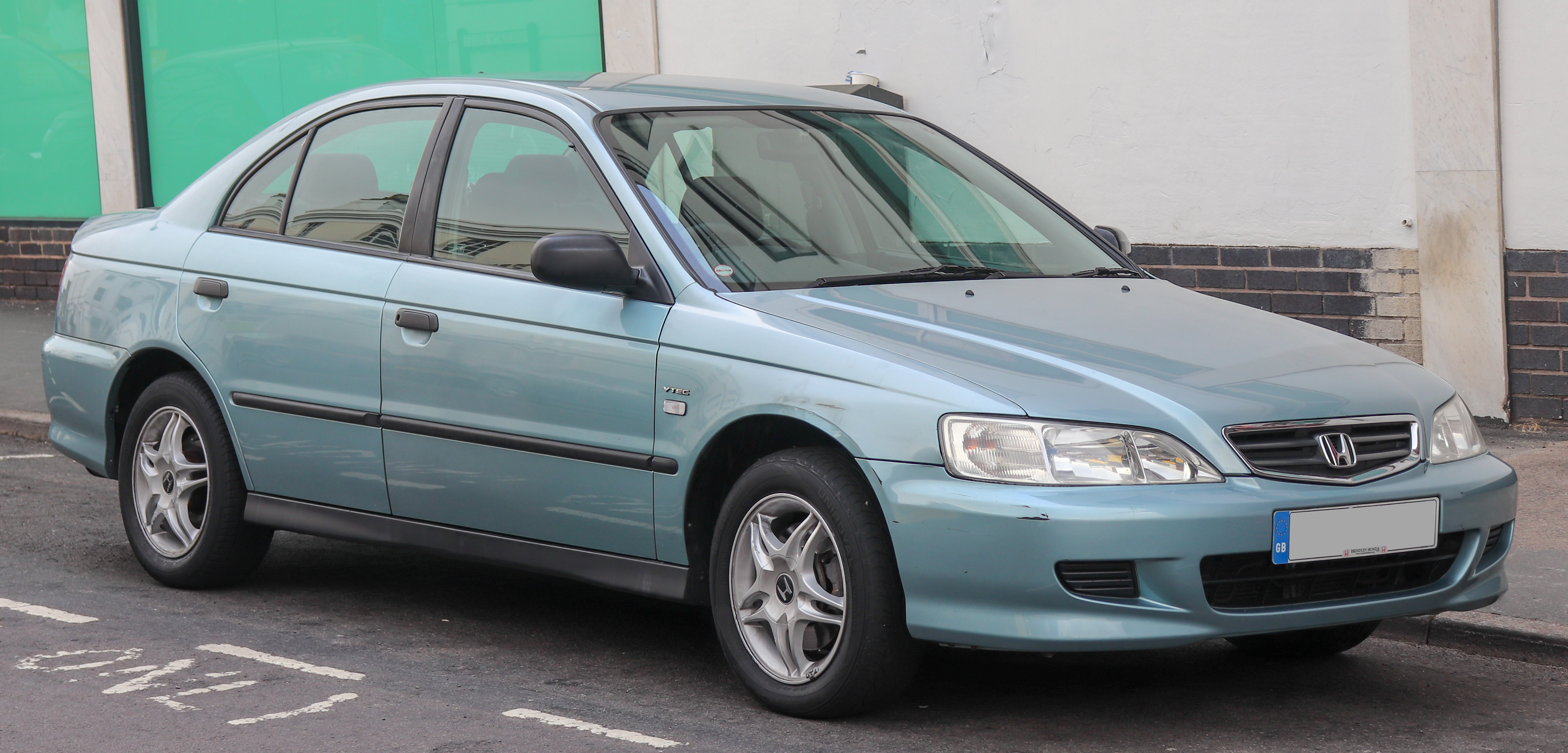

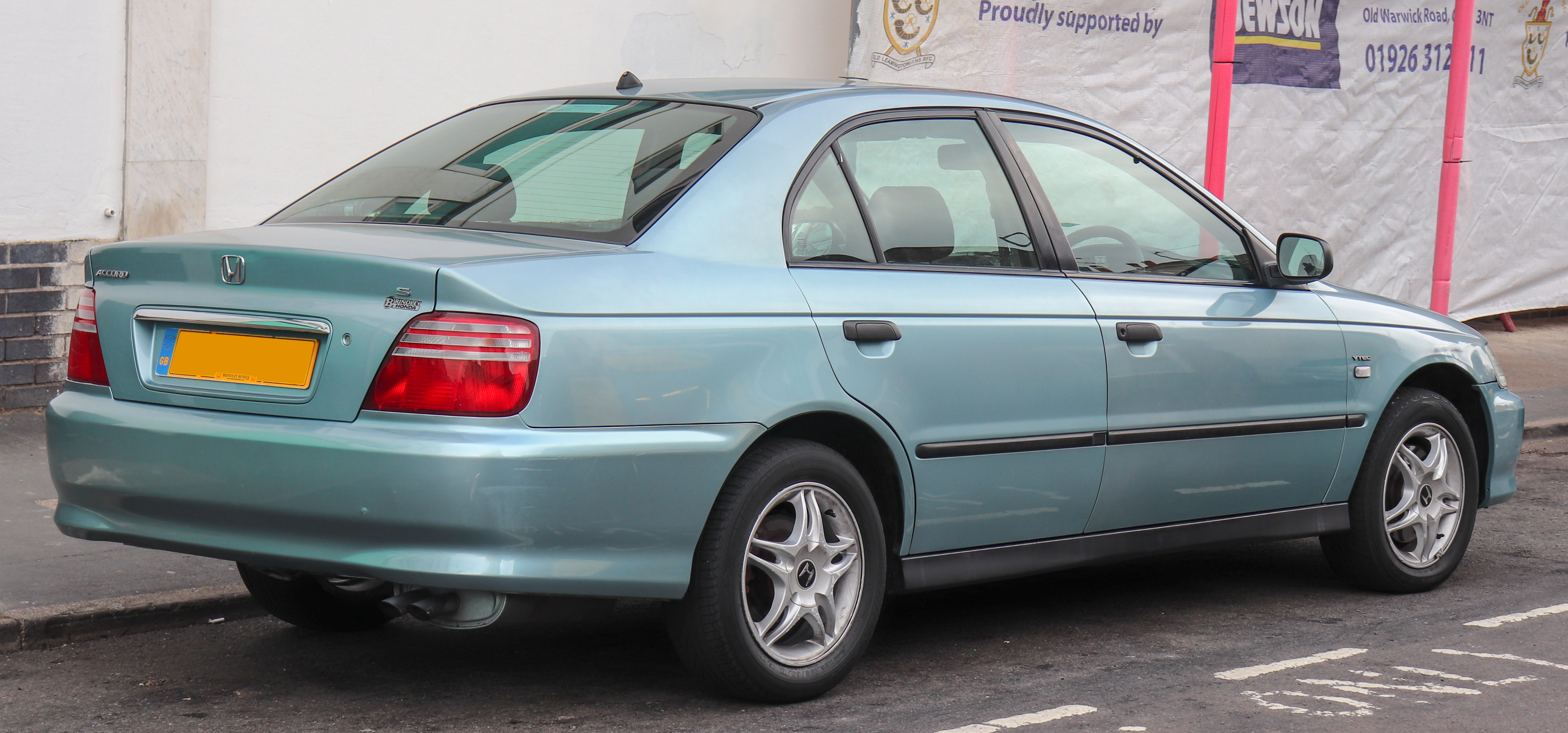
European Accord Sedan (facelift)

The European Accord, also made in Swindon, was different in its styling and was also shorter than the Japanese- and American-market Accords. It was available as a saloon and a 5-door hatchback (liftback), with the U.S.-imported coupe completing the range. It was a platform improvement of the previous generation "European Accord", a joint project with the Rover Group that created the Rover 600, as well as the Honda Ascot Innova. The design approval of the sixth-generation Accord came in early 1995.

The standard Accord featured more items than the base models of similar cars (Ford Mondeo, Peugeot 406, Opel/Vauxhall Vectra, etc.) in its class. The basic S came with ABS, alarm, engine immobilizer, and air conditioning, with the SE added the options of metallic paint, cruise control, climate control and later, satellite navigation. The 1998–1999 ES version came with all those features (except the satellite navigation optional), as well as a walnut and leather-trimmed interior with heated front seats. This model was renamed as the SE Executive in late 1999.

The EU version had a minor facelift in 2001 including a revised grille, alloy wheels, bumpers and both rear and front lights. In 2001, the trim range was expanded with a Type-V; with leather trim as standard equipment, satellite navigation and a tiptronic automatic transmission as optional. The Sport model, which was as the SE, came with modified styling, spoiler and a color-coded side skirt (as opposed to black plastic).

Other engines included a 1.8 L F18B VTEC engine rated at 138 hp (103 kW), a 2 L F20B6 VTEC engine rated at 145 hp (108 kW), as well as a 1.6-litre which was the entry level engine not offered in the United Kingdom, it produces 85 kW (114 hp). The Type-V model (2001–2003) included the F23Z5 VTEC engine, it was the largest engine that the European sixth-generation Accord offered.

The Type-R, Type-V and Sport trims can had a badge on the front grille and hood lid, though the pre-facelift models only signified Type-R on the front. The top of the range SE Executive only became identified as such in 2000 with a badge 'SE EXECUTIVE' on the hood lid. The walnut trim interior was also dropped for the SE Executive during the facelift, while a new climate control system was added.

=== Accord Type R (CH1, 1998–2002) ===
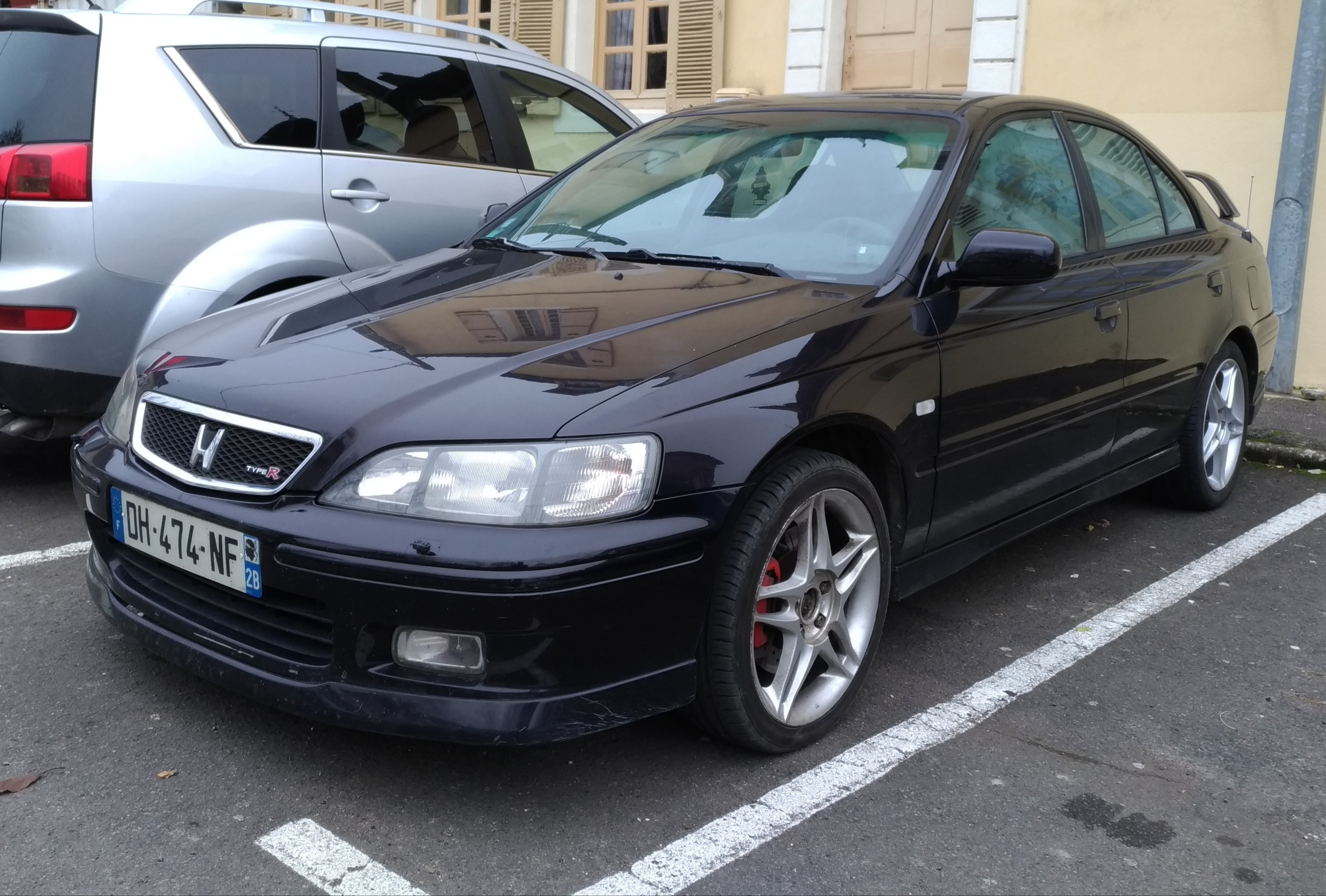
1999 Accord Type R (pre-facelift)

The Accord Type R was a performance variant of the standard Accord, sold in European markets. Apart from a similar yet different body, the European Type R is largely identical to the Japanese CL1 Euro R, including the same "red top" H22A engine; however, in a H22A7 version (compared to H22A for Euro R) producing a lower output at 212 PS (156 kW; 209 hp) at 7,200 rpm and 164 lb⋅ft (222 N⋅m) at 6,700 rpm (compared to 220 PS (162 kW; 217 hp) for Euro R). The engine was mated to a U2Q7 5-speed manual transmission equipped with helical Torsen LSD. Recaro seats, leather-wrapped Momo steering wheel, stiffer suspension, dual exhaust (including 4–2–1 stainless headers), and an aluminum-alloy gear shift knob also came standard. Like the Euro R, the Type R was fitted with a factory body kit. Other differences from the standard model include hydraulic power steering on the Type R.

The Type R was facelifted in 2001 with updates to the bumpers and fog lights, but removing the factory fitted bodykit. The electric radio aerial was also replaced, with a smaller "Bee Sting" style aerial situated at the rear of the roof line. The 5-speed gearbox was revised with stronger synchros in response to a number of failures on the earlier cars, and the exhaust was fitted with more subtle tips, angled downwards and unpolished in comparison to the pre-facelift's straight chrome tips. The interior and other parts stayed identical.

Sales throughout Europe totalled 3,789. The majority of those were sold within the UK, totaling 2,081 units.
