= Honda Torneo =

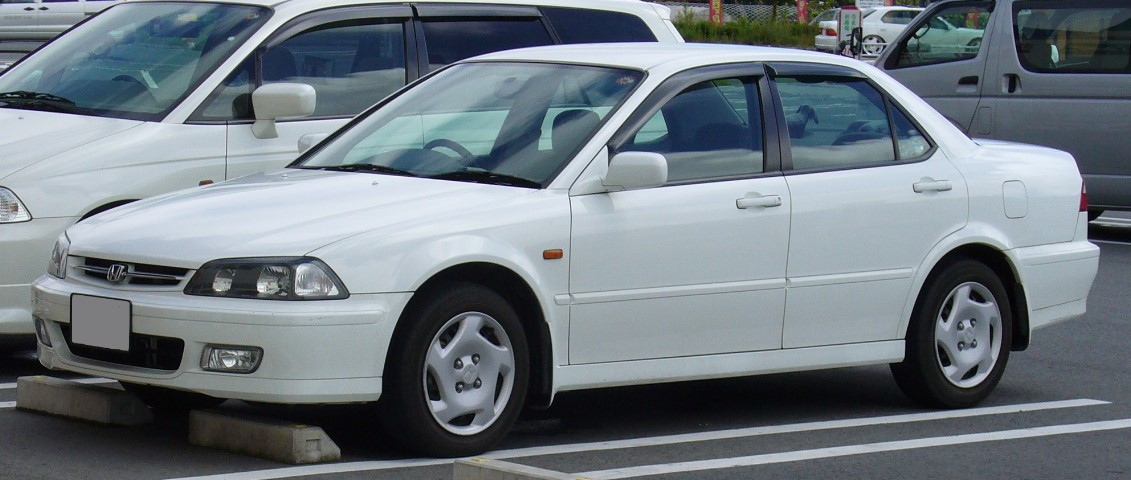

Overview
- Manufacturer: Honda
- Production: 1997–2001; 2002 (for Torneo SiR Euro)
- Assembly: Japan: Sayama, Saitama

Body and chassis
- Class: Mid-size car
- Body style: 4-door sedan
- Layout: Front-engine, front-wheel-drive
- Related: Honda Accord (sixth generation)

Powertrain
- Engine: Petrol: 1.8 L F18B VTEC I4; 2.0 L F20A SOHC VTEC I4; 2.0 L F20B DOHC VTEC I4; 2.2 L H22A DOHC VTEC I4
- Transmission: 4-speed automatic 5-speed manual

Dimensions
- Wheelbase: 2,665 mm (104.9 in)
- Length: 4,680 mm (184.3 in)
- Width: 1,720 mm (67.7 in)
- Height: 1,440 mm (56.7 in)
- Curb weight: 1,390 kg (3,064 lb)

Chronology
- Predecessor: Honda Rafaga; Honda Ascot
- Successor: Honda Accord (Japan and Europe seventh generation)

The Honda Torneo is a mid-size sedan introduced by Honda in 1997, exclusively for the Japanese domestic market, derived from the sixth-generation Honda Accord. While the Accord was sold exclusively at Honda Clio dealerships, the Torneo was available at the other two Honda networks, Honda Verno and Honda Primo as the successor to the Honda Ascot and Honda Rafaga, respectively. Torneo means "tournament" in Spanish.

The introduction of the Torneo continued the original approach Honda used in 1982, with the introduction of the Honda Vigor in offering a unique variant of the Accord, for each of the three dealership Honda sales channels with the sportier Torneo, utilising a different front grille, headlights and tail lights, and exclusive trim packages and color choices.

The Torneo nameplate was discontinued in 2002, when Honda released the seventh-generation Accord. However, the seventh-generation Accord assimilated a number of the sportier characters of the Torneo, making it effectively the successor of the Torneo and the previous generation Accord.

== Trim levels and engines ==
The Torneo was available with HID headlights, which were uncommon at the time. Four engines were available, all equipped with Honda's VTEC technology. A few sport packages were available, including the "Euro R", the "SiR-T", and the "SiR Euro".

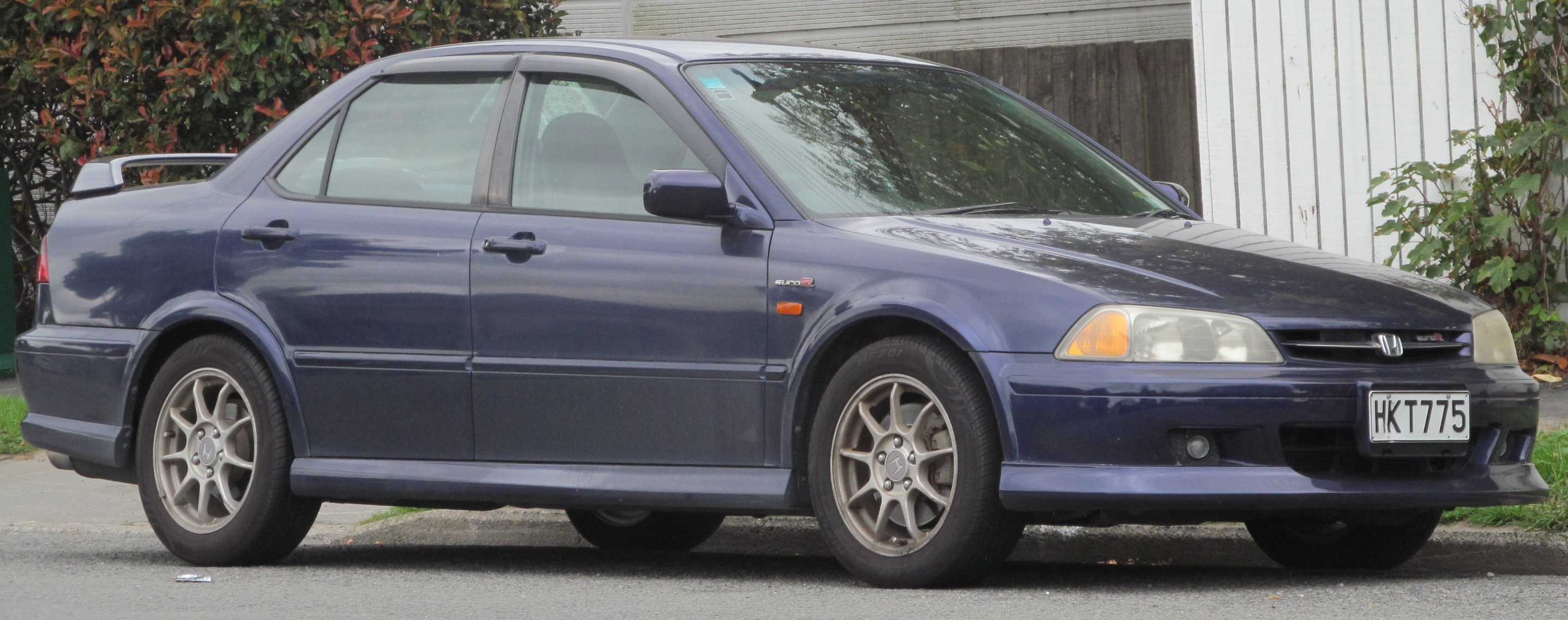
Honda Torneo Euro R, a sport package with very minor trim differences to the Accord Euro R

The Euro R included an H22A engine rated at 220 PS (162 kW; 217 bhp) at 7,200 rpm and 221 N⋅m (163 ft⋅lbf) at 6,500 rpm, 5-speed manual transmission, Recaro seats, leather-wrapped MOMO steering wheel, helical Torsen limited-slip differential, sports suspension, sports exhaust (including 4–2–1 stainless exhaust manifold) and an aluminium alloy gear shift knob.

It was also fitted with a unique factory body kit that included flares and was available in some colours not available to lower trim package Accords (such as Milano Red). The Accord and the Torneo are the same car, aside from minor cosmetic differences in the exterior. All trim levels were available with Honda's internet-based navigation system called Internavi.

=== SiR-T (CF4, 1997–2000) ===
Introduced in 1997, the SiR-T model was only available with a five-speed manual transmission and the 2.0-litre F20B engine rated 200 PS (147 kW; 197 bhp) at 7,200 rpm and 196 N⋅m (145 lb⋅ft) at 6,600 rpm. The F20B engine has an 11.0.1 compression ratio, 85 mm X 88 mm bore and stroke, and a 7400 rpm redline. The H-series DOHC VTEC engines were limited to 7,800 rpm. The F20B had a unique blue valve cover and like all the larger displacement Honda engines, the F20B was mounted with a tilt towards the driver. F20B engines could rev at higher rpms than H22As because it had a shorter stroke. The F20B had an 85 mm x 88 mm bore and stroke when compared to an H22A which had an 87 mm x 90.7 mm bore and stroke. The F20B was also classified as a low emissions engine. The SiR-T was replaced by the even more uncompromising Euro R variant in 2000, whereas the automatic-equipped SiR continued to be available until this vehicle was replaced in 2002.

=== SiR (CF4, 1997–2001) ===
The Torneo SiR was based on the SiR-T, but used the S-Matic automatic transmission with sequential manual shift mode. The maximum output of this version was reduced to 180 PS (132 kW; 178 hp) at 7000 rpm and 192 N⋅m (142 lb⋅ft) at 5,500 rpm. Moving the gear-stick over to the right allowed manual selection of first through fourth gears using up and down shift actions just like the sequential gearboxes used on the JGTC NSX. When a particular gear is selected, the gear stays in position at all engine speeds. When pushed against the rev limiter, the engine would bounce against it just like a manual. However, the gear ratios for each gear were the same as the normal mode. The transmission still worked like a normal automatic transmission in all other operating modes.

=== SiR Euro (CF4, 2002) ===
The Torneo SiR Euro was offered in its very last year of production, 2002. Underneath, it was the same as the original SiR and available only with an automatic transmission, but it was presented with the same exterior styling as the Euro R. Front and rear bumpers, side skirts and arch extensions directly from the Euro R were offered onto the SiR Euro, as well as the "carbon" interior trim. The seats and steering wheel were still original SiR equipment. The SiR Euro also retained the 4-stud wheel hub and had only 1 set of 15-inch wheels available.

== Demise ==
As sales of the Accord proved more popular than the Torneo, plus the economic effects of the Japanese asset price bubble or "bubble economy", the Torneo was discontinued in 2002, along with the dissolution of Honda's three dealership networks Verno, Primo, and Clio three years later. The succeeding Accord also effectively assimilated the sportier character of the Torneo into one car.

== Gallery ==
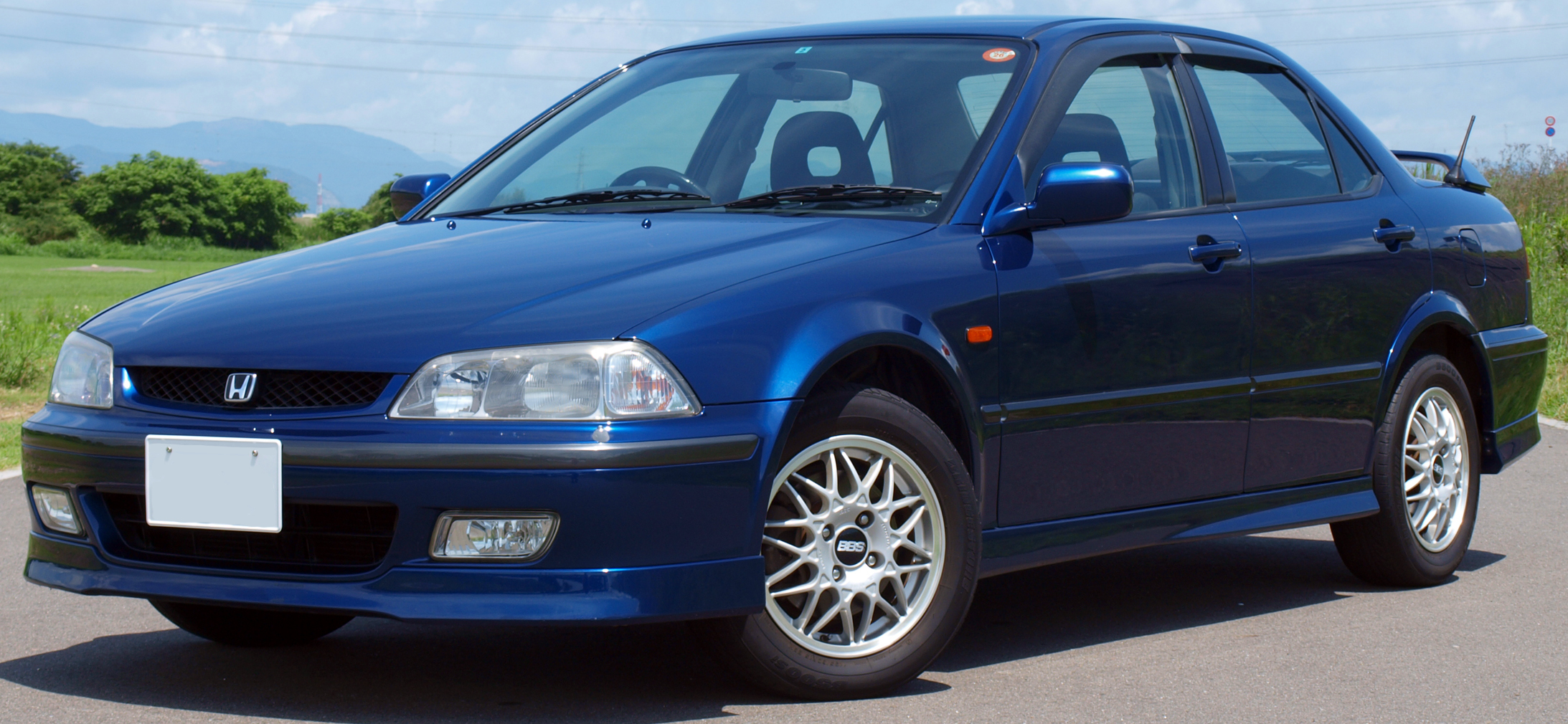
Honda Torneo (pre-facelift)

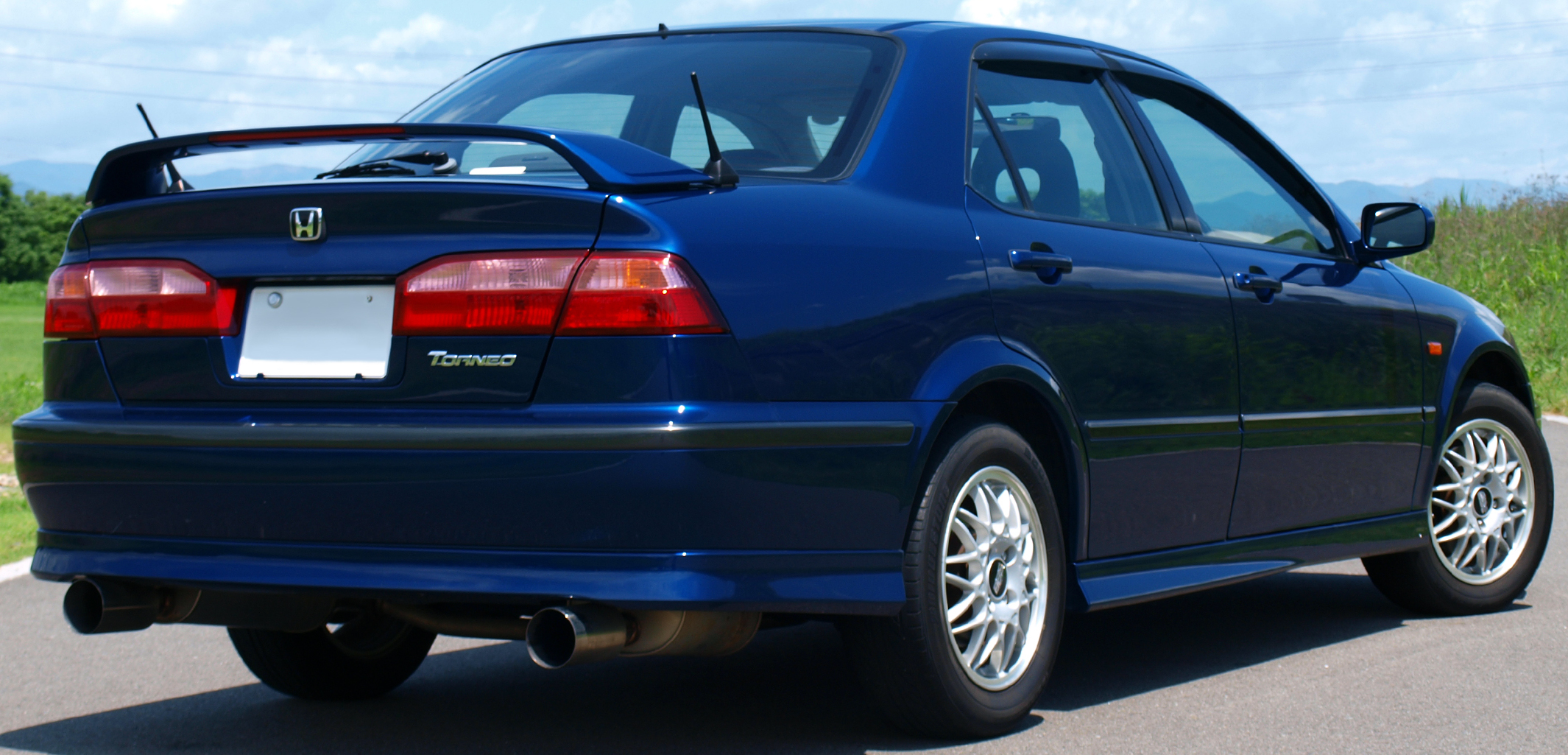
Honda Torneo (pre-facelift)

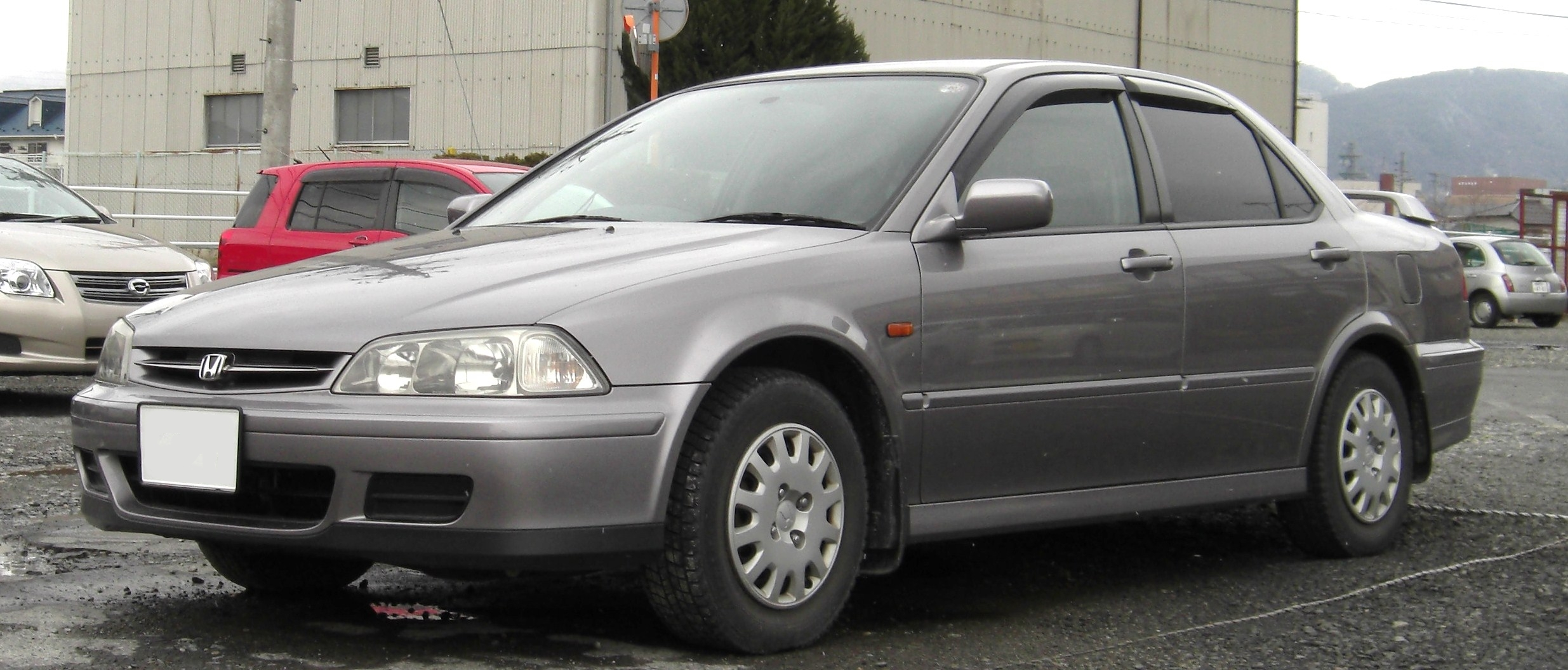
Honda Torneo (facelift)

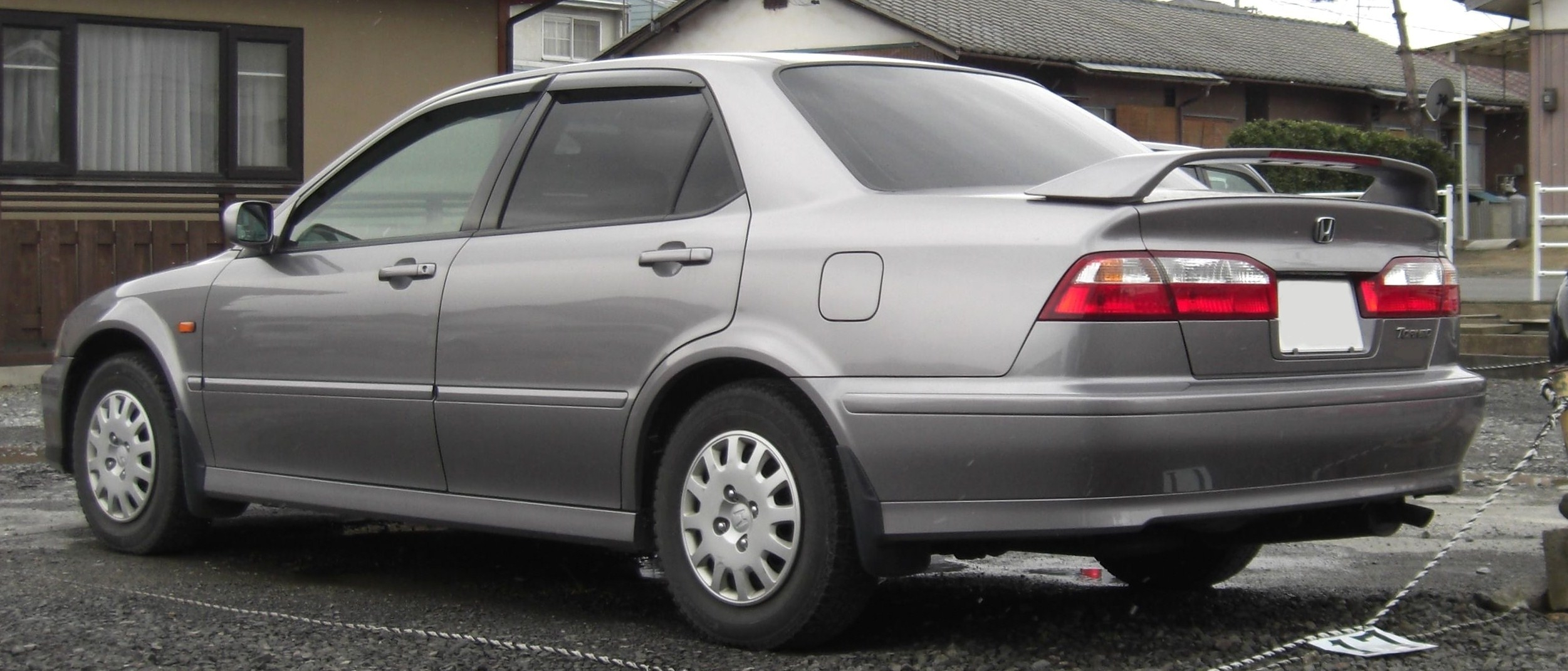
Honda Torneo (facelift)
