= Honda Ascot =

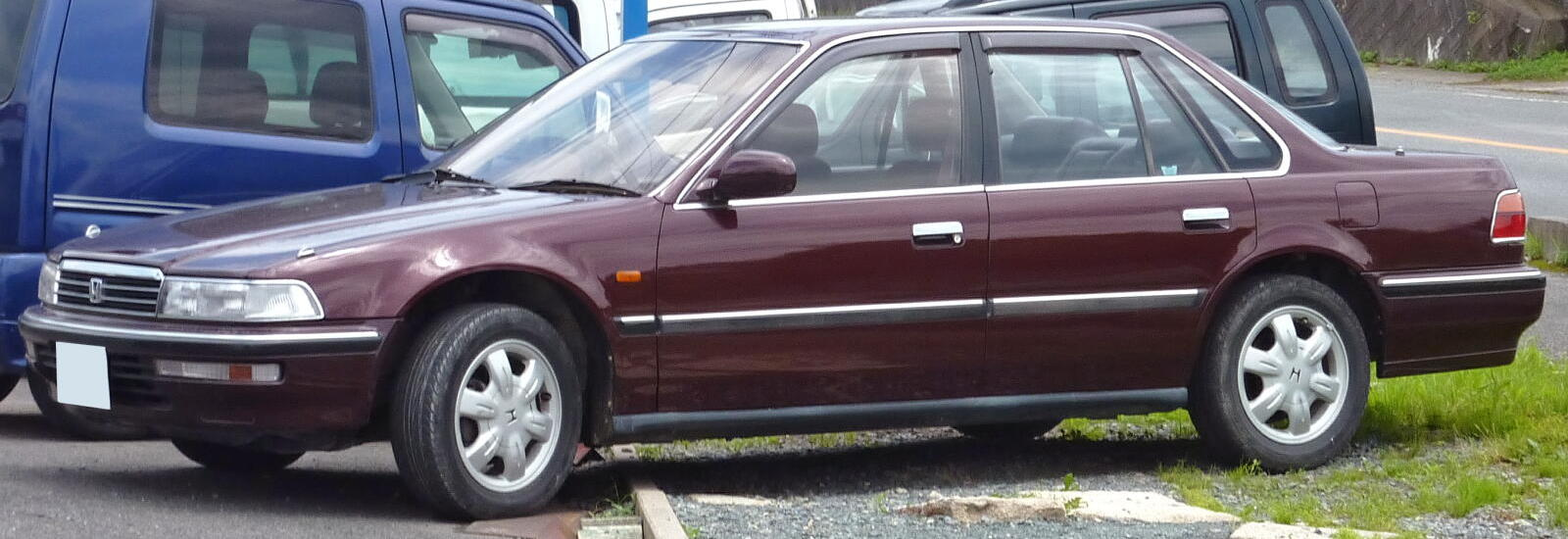

Overview
- Manufacturer: Honda
- Production: 1989–1997
- Assembly: Japan: Sayama, Saitama

Body and chassis
- Class: Compact car
- Layout: Front-engine, front-wheel-drive

Chronology
- Successor: Honda Torneo

The Honda Ascot (Japanese: ホンダ・アスコット, Honda Asukotto) is a compact sedan manufactured by Honda and marketed only in Japan from 1989 until 1997. The first generation produced two versions based on the Honda Accord CB series called the Ascot and from 1992 to 1996 a "pillared hardtop" called the Ascot Innova. The Innova shared much of its mechanicals with the European-market Accord manufactured at the Honda UK facility in Swindon, England, and was essentially the badge engineered Rover 600. The second generation was a platform improvement, shared with the Japan-only sedan called the Honda Rafaga.

The "Ascot" name was chosen with reference to the Ascot Racecourse and Ascot tie, in order to add the model an alleged air of class and elegance. Honda Ascot was also used on a range of one-cylinder motorcycles in the first half of the 1980s.

== First generation (CB1/2/3/4) ==
Honda Ascot (CB)
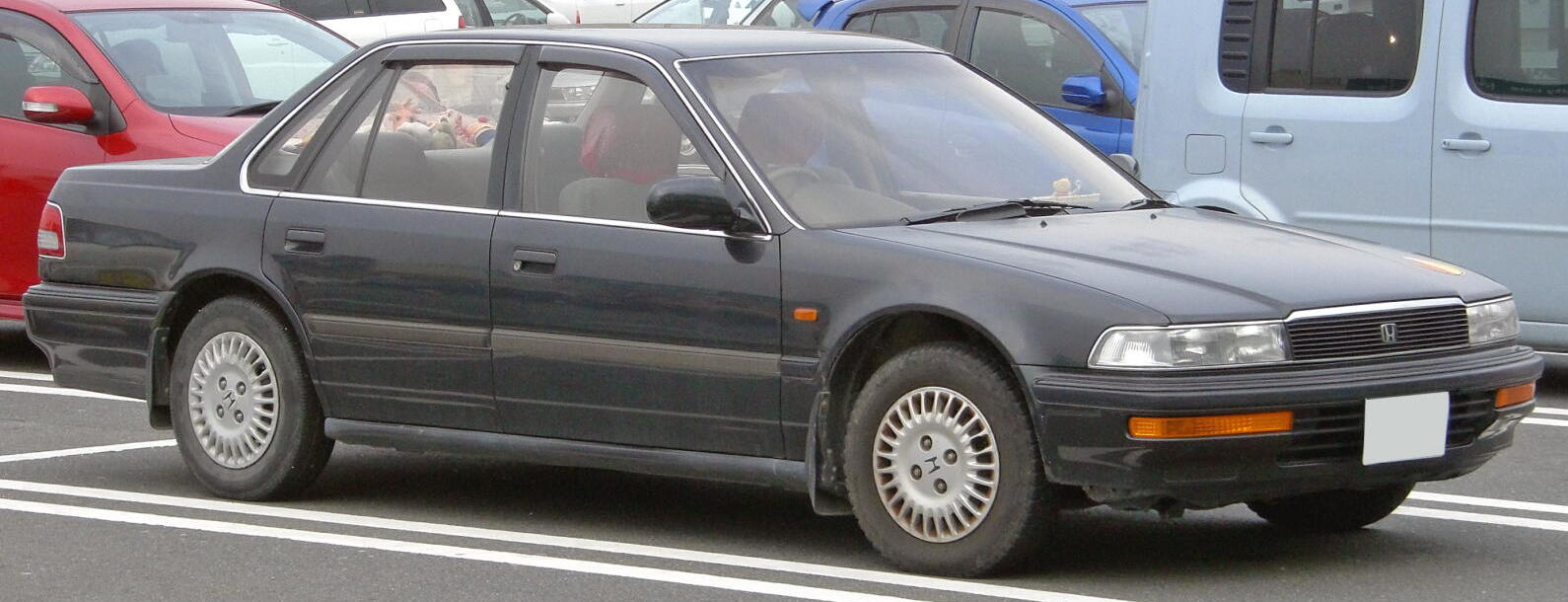

Overview
- Production: 1989–1993

Body and chassis
- Body style: 4-door sedan
- Related: Honda Accord (CB)

Powertrain
- Engine: 1.8 L F18A SOHC I4; 2.0 L F20A1 SOHC I4; 2.0 L F20A DOHC I4
- Transmission: 4-speed automatic 5-speed manual

Dimensions
- Wheelbase: 2,720 mm (107.1 in)
- Length: 4,680 mm (184.3 in)
- Width: 1,695 mm (66.7 in)
- Height: 1,390 mm (54.7 in)
- Curb weight: 1,360 kg (2,998.3 lb)

The first Honda Ascot was borne out Honda's strategy to diversify its sales channels in Japan. In 1985, two separate dealer networks were established, under the names of Honda Clio and Honda Primo, in addition to the already existing Honda Verno network. While the Primo stores handled kei cars, as well as the Honda Civic, the Clio stores focused on larger models, including the top-of-the-line Honda Legend. With the arrival of the fourth-generation Honda Accord (CB) its sales were assigned solely to Honda Clio.

That meant, however, that the Honda Primo network needed an Accord-based compact sedan for the dealership channel. Honda adopted a rather simple solution of creating a "sister car" to Accord, the Honda Ascot. Technically, the Ascot was identical to the Accord sedan, and the interior, including the dashboard, was shared with the Accord. The exterior sheetmetal was unique to the Ascot, with cosmetic differences provided for a different look, befitting the Ascot's upmarket role as the top-of-the-line model of Honda Primo, which sold small, entry-level products. The headlight units were sourced from the Honda Inspire, adding to its luxurious appearance, as well as installing LED high mounted brake light in the trunk rear spoiler.

It came in five trim levels; the FB and the FBX came with the 1.8 litre engine, with the 2.0Si, 2.0FBX-i as the mid-level package, with the top level 2.0FBT-i included four-wheel anti-lock disc brakes, traction control, a viscous coupling differential, mechanical four-wheel steering, and four-wheel double wishbone suspension, with the 2.0 Liter PGM-FI fuel injection engine. Two different engine displacement choices were given so as to allow the Japanese driver which annual road tax obligation they were willing to pay. The fuel economy for the top level engine was rated at 10.4 km/L (29 mpg_{‑imp}; 24 mpg_{‑US}) according to figures quoted in sales materials.

The Ascot had a six-light greenhouse compared to the regular Accord's four-light layout, and featured a different front end with a more formal grille, as well as a revised rear end with an Ascot specific rear tail light treatment, installing the rear license plate indented into the rear bumper. The styling approach was also duplicated on the smaller Honda Concerto, a platform shared with the Honda Civic of the same time period.

== Ascot Innova (CB3/4) ==
Honda Ascot Innova
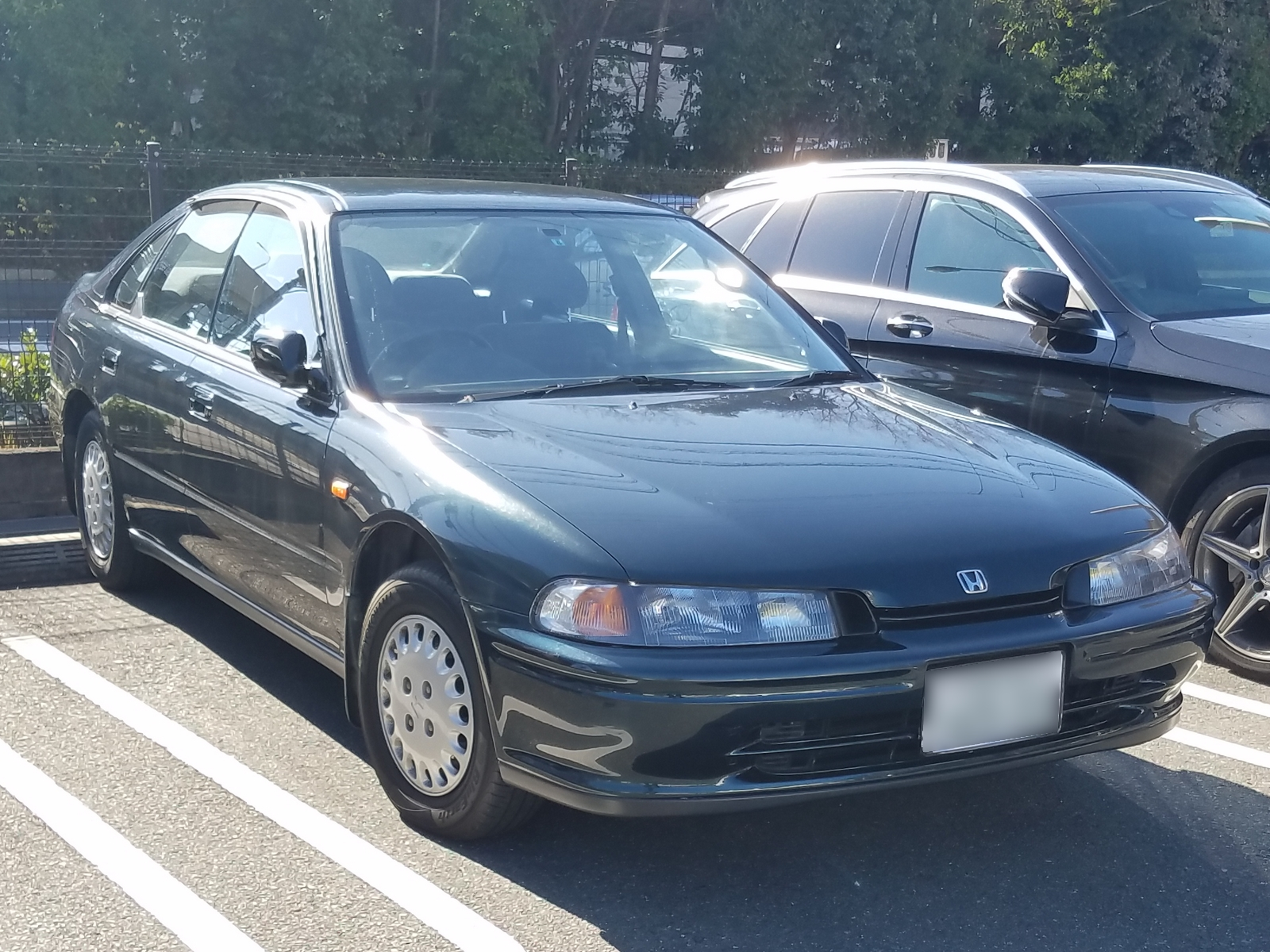

Overview
- Production: 1992–1996

Body and chassis
- Body style: 4-door "hardtop" sedan
- Related: Honda Accord (CB3); Rover 600

Powertrain
- Engine: 2.0 L F20A5 I4 SOHC; 2.0 L F20A5 I4 DOHC; 2.3 L H23A I4 DOHC
- Transmission: 4-speed automatic 5-speed manual

Dimensions
- Wheelbase: 2,720 mm (107.1 in)
- Length: 4,670 mm (183.9 in)
- Width: 1,695 mm (66.7 in); 1,715 mm (67.5 in) (2.3 L engine)
- Height: 1,380 mm (54.3 in)
- Curb weight: 1,370 kg (3,020.3 lb)

Launched on March 5, 1992, the (Japanese: Ascot Innova) was also based on the CB Accord underpinnings, but was given an all-new, modern-looking and rounded body, with styling similar to the Honda Prelude BB4 series (1992–1996). It was the result of a joint effort with the Rover Group that provided Rover with the 600 series, and an Accord that was unique to Europe. The Innova retained the original Ascot's six-light greenhouse layout and horizontal taillights, as well as long, sleek and low body proportions (as opposed to the second-generation Ascot's upright stance and more Accord CF-like rear end). The Innova was fitted with frameless side glazing to provide for the "pillared hardtop" look, thus being Honda's answer to cars like the Toyota Carina ED/Toyota Corona EXiV, Nissan Bluebird ARX and Mitsubishi Emeraude. The Ascot Innova was sold in conjunction to the Ascot, and did not replace it. American actress Geena Davis featured in the promotional commercial for the car, which advertised it under the slogan “Hard Top Innovation”, thus the Innova name.

The Ascot Innova was available in three four-cylinder engine choices: the 2.0-litre F20A unit, producing 135 PS (99 kW; 133 bhp) in the less expensive 2.0iC and 2.0i versions with SOHC, 150 PS (148 bhp; 110 kW) in the 2.0Si trim with DOHC, and the H-series 2.3-litre H23A engine fitted in the export versions of the Prelude, producing 165 bhp (167 PS; 123 kW) (the 2.3-litre versions were designated 2.3Si-Z). While the 2.0-litre versions maintained the 1,695 mm (66.7 in) width which allowed them to remain in the favorable tax class, the 2.3-litre Innovas were 1,710 mm (67.3 in) wide, and as the engine displacement didn't allow them to remain in the lower tax band, buyers in Japan were liable for a higher annual road tax bill.

An electronic 4-wheel steering system like the one in the Prelude was made available for the 2.0i, 2.0Si, and 2.3Si-Z versions, and higher specced trims were also available with a self locking LSD. Apart from the cheapest 2.0iC version, which came with a 5-speed manual transmission, all Ascot Innovas came with a 4-speed Honda Prosmatic automatic transmission. The Ascot Innova range started at ¥1,558,000 for the 2.0iC in the Tokyo sales area, while the most expensive 2.3Si-Z fetched ¥2,992,000 in the Sapporo area, not including extra charges for options such as 4-wheel steering, moonroof, passenger airbag, cornering lamps or ABS.

The Ascot Innova itself remained a JDM-only model, and a Honda Primo exclusive, with no JDM sister cars. It was the result of shared efforts with British partner Rover Group, and the car was sold as the European Accord, which was made in Swindon, UK and marketed in Europe as Honda Accord instead of the North American version. The European Accord and the Ascot Innova exteriors differ slightly, with the Euro-Accord featuring framed windows and wider rear number plate surround. Unique to the Innova however was a modern looking gauge binnacle, with sporty 90-degree horizontally resting needles and rounded/convex dials, compared to the European Accords more contemporary & flat gauge setup. Normally, this type of vehicle with a sports car influence would have been sold at Honda Verno, however because of its strong similarity to the Prelude, and because Honda Verno already had a luxury sports sedan called the Honda Vigor, the Ascot Innova was assigned to Honda Primo instead. Honda Clio already had the Honda Legend and thus did not need another sports sedan in its lineup.

The European Accord was in turn the base for the Rover 600 saloon, developed under Honda's long-standing relationship with the British Rover Group. The Rover 600 and the Swindon Accord also shared two engine options not available for the Ascot Innova - Honda's F18A 1.8-litre unit and Rover's 2.0-litre L-series turbo-diesel. The Ascot Innova remained in production until 1996, while the European Accord saloon continued until 1998, with a facelifted model in 1996. In 1998, it was replaced with an all-new model.

=== Trim Levels ===
- 2,000cc SOHC F20A engine (135 PS)
  - 2.0i･C
  - 2.0i
  - 2.0i･4WS
- 2,000cc DOHC F20A engine (150 PS)
  - 2.0Si
  - 2.0Si･4WS
- 2,300cc DOHC H23A engine (165 PS)
  - 2.3Si-Z
  - 2.3Si-Z･4WS
  - 2.3Si-Z･TCV
  - 2.3Si-Z･TCV･4WS

== Second generation (CE) ==
Honda Ascot (CE)
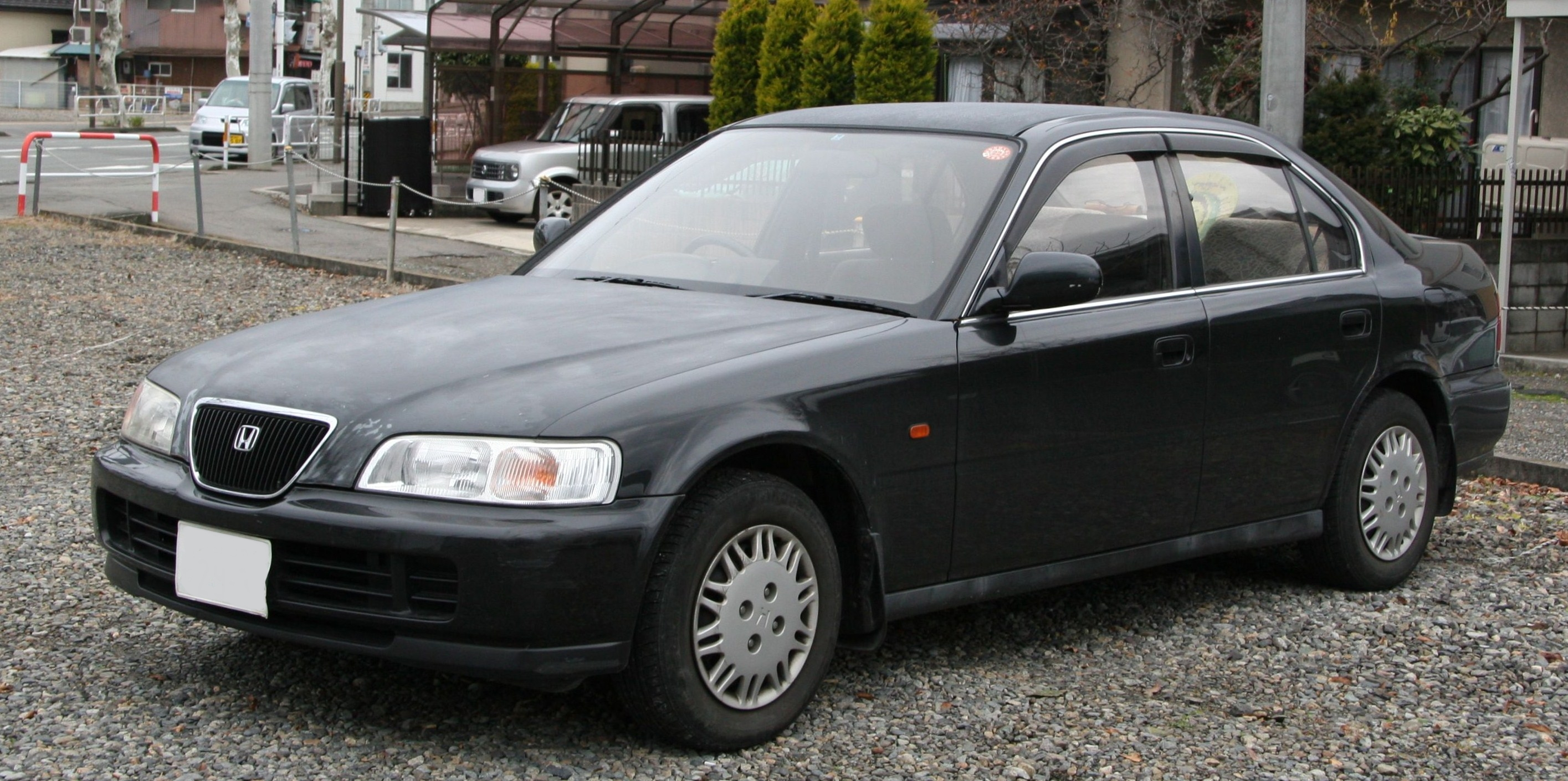

Overview
- Production: 1993–1997

Body and chassis
- Body style: 4-door sedan
- Related: Honda Rafaga

Powertrain
- Engine: 2.0 L G20A1 I5; 2.5 L G25A1 I5
- Transmission: 4-speed automatic 5-speed manual

Dimensions
- Wheelbase: 2,770 mm (109.1 in)
- Length: 4,555 mm (179.3 in)
- Width: 1,695 mm (66.7 in)
- Height: 1,425 mm (56.1 in)
- Curb weight: 1,280 kg (2,821.9 lb) (G20A engine); 1,380 kg (3,042.4 lb) (G25A engine)

The next-generation (CD) Accord grew in size considerably, mostly to satisfy North American market efforts, and thus became too wide to fit within the favorable Japanese tax class. Therefore, Honda needed a slightly smaller compact sedan to cater to the JDM market, and this duty was assigned to the new Ascot.

Rather than being directly based on the now larger Accord, the new Ascot was given its own platform, with the codenames CE4/5, which was a platform improvement of the previous generation. Like the Inspire, Vigor and the even larger Honda Legend, the CE Ascot had its engines mounted longitudinally, contrary to the Accord and most other FWD cars, employing the transverse setup, thereby placing the weight of the engine aligned and behind the front axle and improving vehicle weight distribution between the front and rear axles. In Japan, the smaller G20A engine used regular grade fuel, while the larger G25A engine used premium grade fuel.

The new Ascot had a sloping appearance resembling a coupé, rendering the vehicle shorter and taller than both the CD Accord, Ascot Innova and the Inspire, thus continuing the first Ascot's role as a premium entry-level formal sedan. It was fitted with the 5-cylinder inline Honda G engine, also employed by the Inspire and Vigor, in two displacement versions - 2.0-litre and 2.5-litre, with the gearbox slotted behind it. The wheelbase of the Ascot was shorter than the slightly longer Inspire and Vigor, which measured at 2,805 mm (110.4 in), a difference of 35 mm (1.4 in), which didn't leave much room for rear seat passengers. Furthermore, due to the lengthwise installation of the five-cylinder engine, and the requirement that the overall length of the car comply with Japanese government regulations concerning cars classified as "compact", compromises were made with regards to rear passenger accommodations, and sales suffered as a result. The Ascot also spawned a sister car, the Honda Rafaga, which was sold at Honda Verno stores, which differed from the Ascot only by different external trim details. Both models were replaced by the CF series Accord platform twin Honda Torneo in 1997.
