= 20F =

20F or 20-F may refer to:

- Fluorine-20 (F-20 or ^{20}F), an isotope of fluorine
- Form 20-F, an SEC filing

== See also ==
- F20 (disambiguation)
