= Honda A engine =

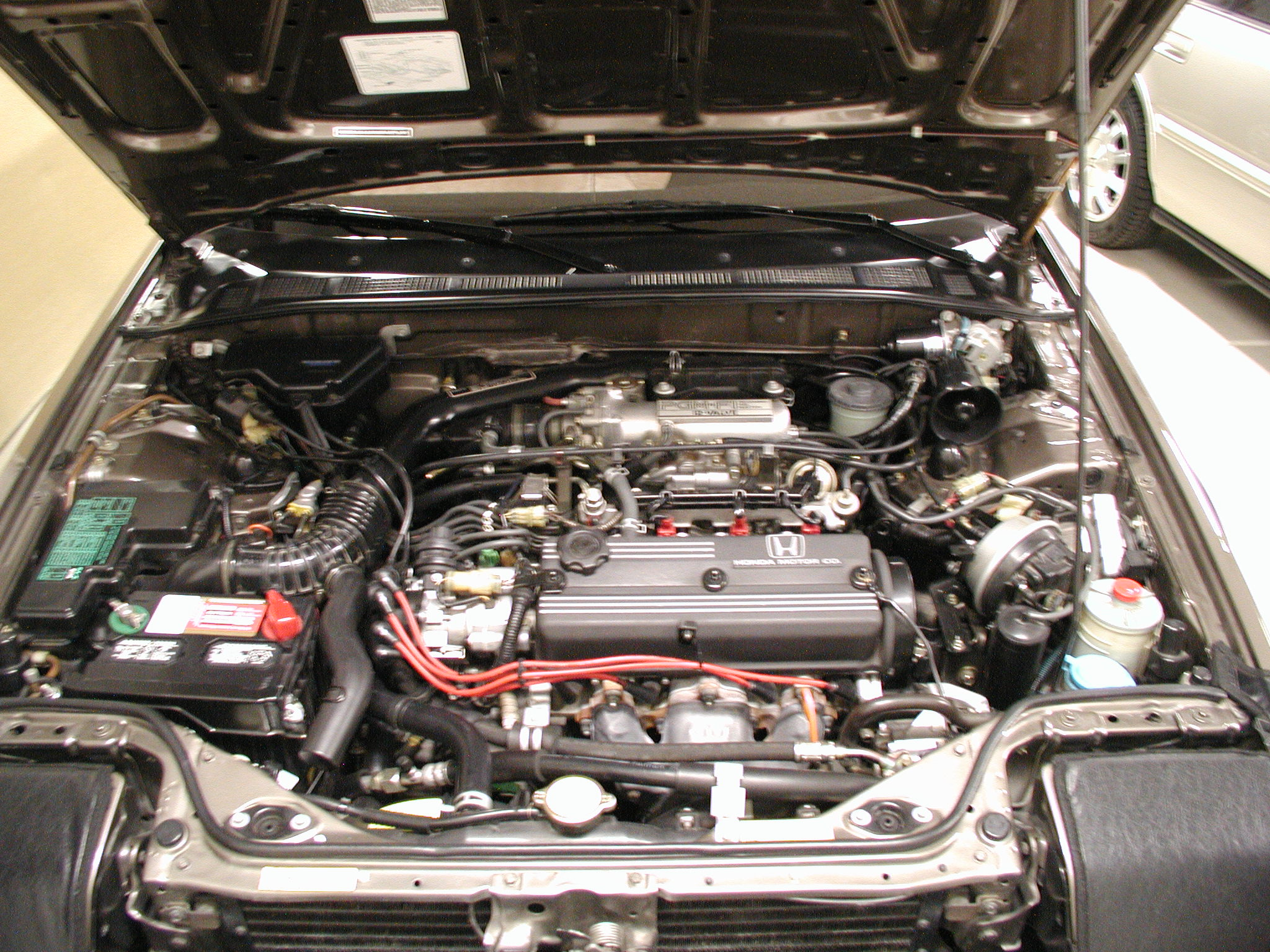
- The fuel injected A20A3 engine in a 1989 Accord SE-i

Overview
- Manufacturer: Honda
- Production: 1982–1989

Layout
- Configuration: Naturally aspirated Inline-4
- Displacement: 1.6 L; 97.5 cu in (1,598 cc); 1.8 L; 111.6 cu in (1,829 cc); 2.0 L; 119.3 cu in (1,955 cc)
- Cylinder bore: 80 mm (3.1 in); 82.7 mm (3.26 in)
- Piston stroke: 79.5 mm (3.13 in); 91 mm (3.6 in)
- Cylinder block material: Cast iron
- Cylinder head material: Aluminum
- Valvetrain: SOHC 3 valves x cyl.
- Compression ratio: 8.9:1-9.4:1

Combustion
- Fuel system: Keihin Carburetor; PGM-FI
- Fuel type: Gasoline
- Cooling system: Water-cooled

Output
- Power output: 89–125 PS (65–92 kW; 88–123 hp)
- Torque output: 123–166 N⋅m; 90–122 lb⋅ft (12.5–16.9 kg⋅m)

Emissions
- Emissions control systems: Catalytic converter

Chronology
- Predecessor: Honda E engine
- Successor: Honda F engine

The Honda A series inline-four cylinder engine is used in 1980s Honda Accord and Prelude models. It was introduced in 1982, with the second-generation Honda Prelude, and available in three displacement sizes: 1.6-, 1.8- and 2.0-liters. It features cast iron block and aluminum SOHC head design with three valves per cylinder for a total of 12 valves. It was available in carbureted and fuel-injected configurations

== History ==
The Honda A-series engines succeeded the earlier EZ, ES, BS and ET engines in the Honda Accord and Prelude. There were several variations, ranging from the 1.6-liter A16A to the 2.0-liter A20A.

Beginning in the 1988 model year, in the North American market, the A20A3 and A20A4 used a dual-stage runner intake manifold design, 4-2-1 exhaust manifold, and a more advanced electronic distributor. The Programmed fuel injection engines were equipped with partial OBD-0 engine computers.

== Aftermarket ==
The aftermarket has produced various parts for the Accord and Prelude A series engine. Most upgrades and modifications to the A-series engines are of the do-it-yourself variety, with one of the more popular being a turbo setup and OBD-1 conversion for more tuneability options.

== A-Series engines ==
The engine of the A-series is based on the cylinder block of the 1.8-liter engine: the 1.6-liter engine has a reduced piston stroke, and the 2.0-liter engine is obtained by increasing the cylinder bore.

=== A16A1 ===
The A16A1 was a carbureted 1.6-liter engine used in 1986–1989 Accords and Vigors outside the North American market. This engine was known as the EZ in 1984 and 1985, non-US Accords.

==== Specifications ====
- Induction: Single 2bbl Keihin carburetor
- Displacement: 1.6 L; 97.5 cu in (1,598 cc)
- Bore x Stroke: 80 mm × 79.5 mm (3.15 in × 3.13 in)
- Compression Ratio: 9.0:1
- Power: 89 PS (65 kW; 88 hp) at 6000 rpm
- Torque 123 N⋅m; 90 lb⋅ft (12.5 kg⋅m) at 3500 rpm

=== A18A ===
The A18A engine was the 1.8-liter engine found in 1982–1987 Honda Prelude and 1986–1988 Accord found in JDM models. Prelude A18A has twin side-draft CV carburetors (also named ET2 in some years) while the Accords came with single down-draught carburetor.

==== Specifications ====
===== Accord =====
(JDM)

- Induction: Single 2bbl Keihin carburetor
- Displacement: 1.8 L; 111.6 cu in (1,829 cc)
- Bore x Stroke: 80 mm × 91 mm (3.1 in × 3.6 in)
- Compression Ratio : 9.0:1
- Power: 100 PS (74 kW; 99 hp) at 5800 rpm
- Torque: 149 N⋅m; 110 lb⋅ft (15.2 kg⋅m) at 3500 rpm

===== Prelude =====
(JDM)

- Induction: Twin side-draft CV carburetors
- Displacement: 1.8 L; 111.6 cu in (1,829 cc)
- Bore x Stroke: 80 mm × 91 mm (3.1 in × 3.6 in)
- Compression Ratio : 9.4:1
- Power: 125 PS (92 kW; 123 hp) at 5800 rpm
- Torque: 153 N⋅m; 113 lb⋅ft (15.6 kg⋅m) at 4000 rpm

=== A20A ===
The A20A was available in both carbureted and fuel-injected versions. It has a SOHC 12-valve NON-CVCC cylinder head, with two intake valves and one exhaust valve per cylinder. They were found in both Accords and Preludes during the 1980s.

==== A20A1 & A20A2 ====
The A20A1 and A20A2 were the carbureted versions of the A20A engines. It was available in the 1986–1989 Accord DX and LX. They are the same engine, the only difference between them being that the A20A2 has no emissions components, so it has a slightly higher power output.

===== Specifications =====
- Induction: Single 2bbl Keihin Feedback Carburetor
- Exhaust: 4-1 Cast Manifold
- Displacement: 2.0 L; 119.3 cu in (1,955 cc)
- Bore x Stroke: 82.7 mm × 91 mm (3.26 in × 3.58 in)
- Compression Ratio : 9.2:1; 9.1:1 (Accord KX model)
- Power (A20A1):
  - 99 PS (73 kW; 98 hp)
  - 148 N⋅m; 109 lb⋅ft (15.1 kg⋅m) at 3500 rpm
- Power (A20A2, Indonesia):
  - 108 PS (79 kW; 107 hp) at 5500 rpm
  - 159 N⋅m; 117 lb⋅ft (16.2 kg⋅m) at 3500 rpm

==== A20A3 and A20A4 ====
The A20A3 and A20A4 were the fuel injected versions of the A20A engines. They were run by Honda's PGM-FI system on a partial OBD-0 computer. The A20A4 gives a slightly higher power output because of not having emissions components. The A20A3 was offered in the 1984–1987 Honda Prelude 2.0Si, the 1986-1989 Honda Accord LX-i as well as the 1989 Honda Accord SE-i.

In 1988, the A20A3 injection system in the US and Canada has been upgraded with a new two-stage intake manifold (Dual-Stage Intake Manifold) and 4-2-1 exhaust manifold and the compression ratio has been increased from 8.8 to 9.3 netting extra 10hp and 8lb-ft of torque.

===== Specifications =====
- Induction: Honda PGM-FI
- Exhaust: 4-1 Cast Manifold (1984–1987); 4-2-1 Cast Manifold (1988-1989)
- Displacement: 2.0 L; 119.3 cu in (1,955 cc)
- Bore x Stroke: 82.7 mm × 91 mm (3.26 in × 3.58 in)
- Compression Ratio : 9.4:1; 8.9:1 (Accord KS Model); 1:8.8 (Accord KX & KG with catalytic converter);
- Power:
  - 1984–1987: 99 PS (73 kW; 98 hp) at 5500 rpm & 138 N⋅m; 102 lb⋅ft (14.1 kg⋅m) at 4500 rpm
  - 1988–1989: 122 PS (90 kW; 120 hp) at 5500 rpm & 166 N⋅m; 122 lb⋅ft (16.9 kg⋅m) at 4000 rpm

== See also ==
- List of Honda engines
