= F20 =

F20, F-20, F.XX, or F-XX may refer to:

- F20 manual transmission, a General Motors transmission
- Northrop F-20 Tigershark, a combat aircraft
- Farmall F-20, a model of Farmall tractor
- Fokker F.XX, a Dutch airliner
- Fujifilm FinePix F20, a digital camera
- Italian submarine F20, an Italian Regia Marina (Royal Navy) submarine in commission from 1918 to 1935
- HMS Gurkha (F20), a British ship
- Schizophrenia ICD-10 code
- BMW 1 Series (F20)
- A Honda F engine
- Fluorine-20 (F-20 or ^{20}F), an isotope of fluorine
- F20 (full, F20T12) is a very common size of 24" x 1.5" (610mm x 38mm) fluorescent lamp used in many parts of the world.
- Leesburg Pike Line (Route F20), a transit bus route in Northern Virginia, United States

== See also ==
- F/A-XX program, an American development and acquisition program for a sixth-generation jet fighter
- FXX (disambiguation)
- 20F (disambiguation)
