= FFX =

The abbreviation FFX may refer to:

== Places ==
- Fairfax County, Virginia, United States
  - Fairfax Connector, the public transit bus service of Fairfax County
- Fairfax, Virginia, an independent city surrounded by Fairfax County

== Games ==
- Final Fantasy X, a role-playing video game developed by Square

== Software ==
- Mozilla Firefox, a web browser

== Military ==
- Future Frigate eXperimental, a South Korean Navy plan for new frigate warships
- FF(X), U.S. Navy program to adapt the U.S. Coast Guard Legend-class National Security Cutter into a frigate

== Other uses ==
- 2014 Fantastic Fest 10, 10th anniversary Fantastic Fest in 2014, a film festival in Austin, Texas, USA; see List of Fantastic Fest editions
- Fear Factor Extreme, a version of the Fear Factor TV game show
- Full Frontal Exposures, a film development company, a subsidiary of Students of Georgetown Inc.

== See also ==
- FX (disambiguation)
- FXX (disambiguation)
