= H2B =

H2B could refer to:

- A Honda powertrain modification consisting of a H series engine coupled to a B series drivetrain.
- H-2B visa, a US program for temporary/seasonal, non-agricultural employment by foreign nationals.
- Heavens to Betsy, a punk rock band from Olympia, Washington, USA.
- Histone H2B, one of 5 main histone proteins involved in the structure of chromatin in eukaryotic cells.
- H-IIB, a family of Japanese rockets.
- Help to Buy, financial assistance for purchasing a home in the UK.
