= List of Honda engines =

This is a list of internal combustion engines models manufactured by the Honda Motor Company.

== Automotive ==
=== Inline 3-cylinder ===
- E0-series
  - 2000–2006 ECA1 (hybrid, only on Honda Insight)
  - 1988–1998 E05A
  - E07A
  - E07Z
- P-series
  - 2003–2011 P07A
  - P07A turbo
  - 2016 P10A turbo
- S-series
  - S07A
  - S07A Turbo

=== Inline 4-cylinder ===
The number in the engine code gives the approximate displacement of the engine without the decimal. For example, B18A would have an approximate displacement of 1.8L and H22A1 would have an approximate displacement of 2.2L.

Some engines below were available in more than one market.

- A-series
  - 1984–87 A18A1 Prelude (America)
  - 1985–89 A20 Accord carbureted (Europe, America)
  - 1986+ A20A1 Accord 2.0 carbureted - EX (Canada), DX LX (US)
  - 1986+ A20A2 Accord 2.0 carbureted - EX (Europe)
  - 1988–89 A20A3 Accord 2.0 EFI - LX-i SE-i (America)
  - 1986+ A20A4 Accord 2.0 EFI - EXi (Europe)
- B-series
  - 1989–92 B16A Civic - SiR (Japan)
  - 1990–93 B16A Integra - RSi/XSi (Japan)
  - 1992–95 B16A Civic - SiR II (Japan)
  - 1989–92 B16A1 Civic - VT (Europe)
  - 1990–91 B16A1 Civic - SiR (Japan)
  - 1991–95 B16A2 Civic - Vti (Europe)
  - 1999–00 B16A2 Civic - Si (America)
  - 1994–97 B16A3 del Sol VTEC (America)
  - 1994–97 B16A3 del Sol - Vti-T (Europe)
  - 1996–00 B16A4 Civic - SiR II (Japan)
  - 1996–00 B16A6 Ballade - VTEC (SO3/SO4) (South Africa)
  - 1997–01 B16B Civic Type R (Japan)
  - 1992–93 B17A1 Integra GS-R (America)
  - 1990–93 B18A1 Integra (America)
  - 1994–01 B18B1 Integra (America)
  - 1994–96 B18B3 Ballade Ballade = 4dr Civic (South Africa)
  - 1996–00 B18B4 Ballade Ballade = 4dr Civic (South Africa)
  - 1994–95 B18C Integra Si VTEC (Japan)
  - 1995–99 B18C Integra SiR-G (Japan)
  - 1996–00 B18C Integra Type R (Japan)
  - 1994–01 B18C1 Integra GS-R (America)
  - 1996–97 B18C3 Integra Type R (Taiwan/Hong Kong)
  - 1996 B18C3 Civic VTi 1.8
  - 1997+ B18C4 Civic 1.8 Vti (Europe)
  - 1997-98, 2000–01 B18C5 Integra Type R (America)
  - 1996+ B18C6 Integra Type R (Europe)
  - 1996+ B18C7 Integra Type R (Australia)
  - 1987–89 B20 Accord 2.0i (Europe)
  - 1985–87 B20A1 Prelude Fi (Europe)
  - 1986+ B20A1 Prelude 2.0i (Europe)
  - 1987+ B20A2 Accord 2.0i EX (Europe)
  - 1990-91 B20A3 Prelude 2.0 S (America)
  - 1988+ B20A4 Prelude 2.0
  - 1990–91 B20A5 Prelude 2.0 Si (America)
  - 1988–89 B20A5 Prelude Si (America)
  - 1988–91 B20A6 Prelude 4WS Si (Australia)
  - 1987–92 B20A7 Prelude 2.0i (Europe)
  - 1988+ B20A8 Accord 2.0i (Europe)
  - 1987–92 B20A9 Prelude 4WS 2.0i (Europe)
  - 1997–98 B20B CR-V (America)
  - 1997+ B20B3 CR-V RD1 (Europe)
  - 1997–98 B20B4 CR-V
  - B20Z SMX (Japan)
  - 1990–91 B21A1 Prelude Si (America)
- D-series
  - 1991 1.4 L D14 (Civic)
  - 1984–87 1.5 L D15A2 (CRX) HF
  - 1985–87 1.5 L D15A3 (CRX) Si
  - 1991–99 1.5 L D15B (Civic) VTi VTEC
  - 1996–02 1.3 L D13B4 (City)LXi/EXi/DX
  - 1988–91 1.5 L D15B2 (Civic) DX/LX, (CRX) DX (LSi in Europe)
  - 1988–91 1.5 L D15B6 (Civic) Base, (CRX) HF
  - 1992–95 1.5 L D15B7 (Civic) DX/LX, del Sol S
  - 1992–95 1.5 L D15B8 (Civic) CX
  - 1999–02 1.5 L D15C2 Honda City VTEC - (India)
  - 1992–95 1.5 L D15Z1 (Civic) VX VTEC-E
  - 1996–98 1.5 L D15Z4 (Civic) LX
  - 1996–00 1.5 L D15Z6 (Civic) (VTEC SOHC) (iLS in Europe)
  - 1986–89 1.6 L D16A1 (Integra) DOHC
  - 1986–89 1.6 L D16A3 (Integra) DOHC (Australia)
  - 1988–91 1.6 L D16A6 (Civic) Si, (CRX) Si, (Civic) EX (South Africa)
  - 1988–89 1.6 L D16A8 (Integra) DOHC
  - 1988–89 1.6 L D16A9 (Integra) (CRX in Europe) DOHC (South Africa)
  - 1992–95 1.6 L D16Y1 (Civic) Vti SOHC (Australia)
  - 1996–00 1.6 L D16Y4 (Civic) İES NON VTEC(TURKEY)
  - 1996–00 1.6 L D16Y5 (Civic) HX VTEC-E
  - 1997–00 1.6 L D16Y7 (Civic) DX/LX/CX
  - 1996–00 1.6 L D16Y8 (Civic) EX/(Canada)Si SOHC VTEC
  - 1990–92 1.6 L D16Z5 (Civic) (CRX in Europe) DOHC
  - 1992–95 1.6 L D16Z6 (Civic) EX/Si, del Sol Si SOHC VTEC
  - 2001–05 1.7 L D17A1 (Civic) DX/LX
- Honda HR-414E/HR-417E/HR-420E engine
  - 2014-18 Dallara SF14
  - 2019-22 Dallara SF19
  - 2023+ Dallara SF23
  - 2014-16 Honda NSX Concept-GT
  - 2017-21 Honda NSX-GT
  - 2022-23 Honda NSX-GT "Type S"
  - 2024-25 Honda Civic Type R-GT
  - 2026+ Honda Prelude-GT

VTEC

- D-series
  - 2001–05 1.7 L D17A2 (Civic) EX VTEC/VTEC-II
  - 2001–05 1.7 L D17A6 (Civic) HX VTEC-E
  - 2004–05 1.7 L D17A7 (Civic) GX
  - 1998–06 1.6 L D16A (HR-V) J/J4
  - 1998–06 1.6 L D16A (HR-V) JS/JS4 VTEC
  - 1996–00 1.6 L D16Y8 (Civic) EX/(Canada)Si VTEC
  - 1992–95 1.6 L D16Z6 (Civic) EX/Si, del Sol Si VTEC
  - 1992–95 1.5 L D15B (Civic Ferio) VTi, del Sol VXi VTEC
  - 1997–00 1.5 L D15B (Civic Ferio) Vi-RS 3-Stage VTEC
  - 2000–03 1.5 L D15B (Civic) G4 VTEC
- E-series
  - 1973 1.2 L EB (Civic)
  - 1975 1.5 L EC (Civic)
  - 1975 1.5 L ED (Civic) CVCC
  - 1976 1.6 L EF (Accord)
  - 1980 1.3 L EJ (Civic)
  - 1979 1.8 L EK (Accord/Prelude)
  - 1979 1.6 L EL (Accord/Prelude)
  - 1980 1.5 L EM (Civic) CVCC
  - 1980 1.3 L EN (Civic)
  - 1980 1.6 L EP (Quint/Accord)
  - 1981 1.2 L ER (City AA)
  - 1983 1.8 L ES (Accord/Prelude)
  - 1983 1.8 L ET (Prelude)
  - 1983 1.3 L EV (Civic)
  - 1983 1.5 L EW (Civic/CRX)
  - 1983 1.5 L EW2 (Civic)
  - 1985 1.5 L EW3 (Civic/CRX)
  - 1984 1.4-1.5 L EW4 (Civic)
- F-series
  - 1994–02 1.8 L F18B (Accord) VTEC
  - 1988 2.0 L F20 (Accord) VTEC
  - 1992–97 F20A4 (Prelude) SOHC
  - 2000–05 F20C (S2000) (Japan)
  - 2000–03 F20C1 (S2000) (America)
  - 2005–09 F22C (S2000) (Japan)
  - 2004–09 F22C1 (S2000) (America)
  - 1990–96 F22 (Accord/Prelude/CL/Odyssey/Isusu Oasis/Isuzu Aska) VTEC & Non-VTEC
  - 1998–02 2.3 L F23 (Accord/CL/Odyssey/Isuzu Oasis) VTEC
- H-series
  - 1991–96 H22A Prelude Si VTEC (Japan)
  - 1994–97 H22A Accord SiR (Japan)
  - 1997–01 H22A Prelude SiR, SiR S-spec, Type S (Japan)
  - 2000–02 H22A Accord Euro R (Europe)
  - 1993–96 H22A1 Prelude VTEC (America)
  - 1993–96 H20A4 Modified Prelude VTEC (America)
  - 1997–98 H22A1 Prelude VTiR (Australia)
  - 1993–96 H22A2 Prelude 2.2i VTEC (Europe)
  - 1996 H22A3 Prelude VTEC (KU)
  - 1997–01 H22A4 Prelude SH & Base(America)
  - 1997–98 H22A5 Modified Prelude (Europe)
  - 1999–02 H22A7 Accord Type R (Europe)
  - 1999–01 H22A8 Modified Prelude (Europe)
  - 1999–01 H22Z1 Prelude VTiR (Australia)
  - 1999–02 H23A Accord Wagon, SiR Wagon (Japan)
  - 1991–93 H23A1 Prelude SRS (Australia)
  - 1991–95 H23A1 Prelude Si (Australia)
  - 1992–96 H23A1 Prelude Si; SE (America)
  - 1992–96 H23A2 Prelude 2.3i (Europe)
  - 1993–95 H23A3 Accord 2.3i SR (Europe)
- L-series
  - 2001 1.3 L L13A (Fit/Jazz) - engine marketed as 1.4L in certain regions
  - 2002 1.2 L L12A (Jazz)
  - 2002 1.5 L L15A (Fit/Fit Aria/Airwave/Mobilio)
  - 2013 1.5 L L15B DOHC (Fit)
  - 2016 1.5 L L15B DOHC VTC Turbo (Honda Civic/Honda Accord/Honda HR-V/Honda CR-V)
  - 2012 1.5 L LEA-MF6 (Honda Civic Hybrid)
- Circle L - General Motors/Isuzu 1.7 L Diesel
- R-series
  - 2006 1.6 L R16A (Honda Civic) i-VTEC (Singapore, Egypt, Turkey, Cyprus)
  - 2006 1.8 L R18A1 (Honda Civic) i-VTEC
  - 2006 1.8 L R18A2 (Honda Civic) i-VTEC (EDM)
  - 2006 2.0 L R20A1 (Honda Stream) i-VTEC
  - 2013 2.0 L R20A1 (Acura ILX) i-VTEC

i-VTEC

- K-series
  - 2001–11 K20A Integra Type R; Civic Type R; Accord Euro R (Japan)
  - 2002–04 K20A2 RSX Type S (America)
  - 2001+ K20A3 Integra IS (Japan)
  - 2001–06 K20A3 RSX Base, Civic Si (America)
  - 2003+ K20B 2.0l VTEC-i, Stream 4WD (Japan)
  - 2003+ K24A Accord; Accord Wagon (Japan)
  - 2003–08 K24A2 TSX 200 (America)
  - 2002+ K24A3 CRV; Element; Accord
  - 2003–05 K24A4 2.4L VTEC-i Honda Accord
  - 2006–07 K24A8 2.4L VTEC-i (Drive-by wire equipped) Accord
  - 2008–12 K24Z3 2.4L Honda Accord / Accord Euro (CU2)
  - 2005–06 K20Z1 RSX Type S (America)
  - 2007+ K23A1 RDX
  - 2006–11 K20Z3 Civic Si
  - 2007–11 K20Z4 Civic Type R (Europe)
  - 2012+ K24Z7 Civic Si
  - 2013+ K24W2 Accord
  - 2013+ K24W3 Accord Sport
  - 2015+ K20C1 Civic Type R

Diesel

- N-series
  - 2001?–Present 1.6 L N16A1
  - 2004–06 2.2 L N22A2 FR-V (Europe)/Edix (Japan) - diesel i-CTDi (Common Rail Direct Fuel Injection)

=== Inline 5-cylinder ===
- G-series
  - 1993–1997 2.0 L G20 (Ascot/Rafaga)
  - 1989–1994 2.0 L G20 (Honda Inspire)
  - 1992–1994 2.5 L G25 (Vigor)
  - 1995–1998 2.5 L G25 (TL)

=== V6 ===
- RA16 - 80° DOHC
  - 1983–1984 1.5 L RA163E (Spirit 201/Williams FW09)
  - 1985 1.5 L RA165E (Williams FW10)
  - 1986 1.5 L RA166E (Williams FW11/Lotus 99T)
  - 1987 1.5 L RA167E (Williams FW11B)
  - 1988 1.5 L RA168E (McLaren MP4/4/Lotus 100T)
- C-series - 90° SOHC
  - 1986–1988 2.0 L C20A (Legend)
  - 1989 2.0 L C20AT (Legend (Turbo))
  - 1986–1987 2.5 L C25A (Legend/Rover 825/Sterling 825L/Sterling SL)
  - 1986–1997 2.7 L C27A (Legend/Accord/Rover 827/Sterling 827L/Sterling SL/Rover Vitesse/Rover Coupe)
  - 1991–1995 3.2 L C32A (Legend)
  - 1996–2004 3.5 L C35A (RL/Legend)
- C-series - 90° DOHC
  - 1991–2005 3.0 L C30A - NSX (manual transmission to 1996, all automatic transmission)
  - 1997–2005 3.2 L C32B - NSX (manual transmission from 1997)
- J-series - 60° SOHC
  - 1998–2003 2.5 L J25A JDM only engine debuted in 1999 Honda Inspire/Saber 25V.
    - 1999–2003 J25A - Inspire, Saber (UA4) (1998+)
  - 1996+ 3.0 L J30A Debuted in the 1997 Acura 3.0CL. First production J-series.
    - 2003–2007 J30A - Inspire (UC1) (2002+) VCM (Japan market only)
    - 1997–2003 J30A1 - Odyssey (RL1), CL (YA1), Avancier (TA3, TA4), Accord (CG1, CG2) (1996+)
    - 2003–2005 J30A4 - Accord (CM6) (2002+)
    - 2003–2007 J30A5 - Accord (CM6), Inspire (UC1) (2002+) VCM on JDM Inspire model only
    - 2013-2018 J30Y1 - RDX (China) (TB3, TB4)
    - 2005–2007 JNA1 - Accord Hybrid (CN3) (2004+)
    - 2017-2020 JNA2 - Acura MDX Sport Hybrid (YD7) (2017+) J30Y1 hybrid
    - 2020+ J30AC - Acura TLX Type-S/Acura MDX Type-S - Turbocharged DOHC
  - 1998–2008 3.2 L J32A Debuted in the 1999 Acura TL/Honda Inspire 32V/Honda Saber 32V.
    - 1999–2003 J32A1 - CL (YA4), TL (UA4), Inspire (UA4) (1998+)
    - 2002–2003 J32A2 - CL Type-S (YA4), TL Type-S (UA5) 260hp (2001+)
    - 2004–2008 J32A3 - TL (UA6) (2003+)
  - 1998-2008 3.5 L J35A Debuted in the 1999 Honda Odyssey/Lagreat.
    - 1999–2001 J35A1 - Odyssey (RL1) (1998+) (Also sold in Japan in the 1999-2005 Honda Lagreat)
    - 2001–2004 J35A3 - MDX, Vue (also referred to as GM L66) (YD1) (2000+)
    - 2002–2004 J35A4 - Odyssey (RL1), Pilot (YF1) (2001+)
    - 2005-2010 J35A6 - Odyssey (RL3), Pilot (YF2) (2004+)
    - 2005-2010 J35A7 – VCM - Odyssey (RL3, RL4) (2004+) VCM EX-L and Touring Models only - 2005-2007 models are equipped with VCM-1 (3- and 6-cylinder operation) - 2008-2010 models are equipped with VCM-2 (3-, 4-, and 6-cylinder operation).
    - 2005–2008 J35A8 - RL (KB1), TL Type-S (UA7) (2004+)
    - 2006–2008 J35A9 - Ridgeline (YK1), Pilot (YF1) (4WD) (2005+)
  - 2005–2018 3.5 L J35Z Debuted in the 2006 Honda Pilot FWD model.
    - 2008–2012 J35A - Inspire (CP3) (2007+) VCM Japan market Inspire 35TL only. Engine is completely identical to J35Z2 in USDM Accord V6.
    - 2006–2008 J35Z1 - Pilot (YF2) (FWD) (2005+) VCM
    - 2008–2012 J35Z2 - Accord (CP3) (2007+) VCM
    - 2013–2018 J35Z2 - RDX (TB3, TB4) (2012+) VCM
    - 2008–2012 J35Z3 - Accord (CS2) (2007+) (6-speed) non-VCM
    - 2009–2014 J35Z4 - Pilot (YF3, YF4) (2008+) VCM
    - 2009–2014 J35Z5 - Ridgeline (YK1) (2008+)
    - 2009–2014 J35Z6 - TSX V6 (CU4), TL (UA8) (FWD) (2008+) VCM for TSX models only
    - 2011–2017 J35Z8 - Odyssey (RL5) (2010+) VCM
  - 2012+ 3.5 L Earth Dreams J-series Debuted on 2013 Honda Accord V6.
    - 2013-2017 J35Y1 – VCM - Accord (CR3), Crosstour (TF2) (2012+) VCM
    - 2013-2017 J35Y2 - Accord (CT2) (2012+) (6-speed)
    - 2014-2020 J35Y4 – VCM - RLX (KC1, KC2) (2013+) VCM
    - 2014-2020 J35Y5 – VCM - MDX (YD3, YD4) (2013+) VCM
    - 2015-2020 J35Y6 - TLX (UB1, UB2, UB3, UB4), Ridgeline (YK2, YK3) (2017+) VCM
    - 2017+ J35Y7 - Odyssey (RL6) (2018+) VCM
    - 2023+ J35Y8 - Honda Pilot, Honda Pilot (YG1, YG2) (2022+) DOHC
  - 2006–2014 3.7 L J37 Debuted in the 2007 Acura MDX.
    - 2007–2013 J37A1 - MDX (YD2) (2006+)
    - 2009–2012 J37A2 - RL (KB2) (2008+)
    - 2009–2014 J37A4 - TL (SH-AWD) (UA9) (2008+)
    - 2010–2013 J37A5 - ZDX (YB1) (2009+)
- JNC1 - 75° DOHC Debuted in the 2017 Acura/Honda NSX.
  - 2017+ 3.5 L JNC1 - NSX (NC1)
- Honda HI14RTT
  - 2012+ 2.2 L twin-turbo (Dallara DW12)
- HR28TT
  - 2010 2.8 L twin-turbo (Acura ARX-01)
  - 2012 2.8 L twin-turbo (HPD ARX-03 and Ligier JS P2)
  - 2014 2.8 L twin-turbo (HPD ARX-04b)
- HR35TT/AR35TT
  - 2015 3.5 L twin-turbo (SCG 003 Competizione)
  - 2016 3.5 L twin-turbo (Ligier JS P2)
  - 2018 3.5 L twin-turbo (Acura ARX-05)
- Honda Formula 1 V6 turbo hybrid - 90° DOHC
  - 2015 1.6 L RA615H (McLaren MP4-30)
  - 2016 1.6 L RA616H (McLaren MP4-31)
  - 2017 1.6 L RA617H (McLaren MCL32)
  - 2018 1.6 L RA618H (Toro Rosso STR13)
  - 2019 1.6 L RA619H (Red Bull Racing RB15 and Toro Rosso STR14)
  - 2020 1.6 L RA620H (Red Bull Racing RB16 and AlphaTauri AT01)
  - 2021 1.6 L RA621H (Red Bull Racing RB16B and AlphaTauri AT02)
  - 2022-23 1.6 L RBPTH001 (Red Bull Racing RB18, Red Bull Racing RB19, AlphaTauri AT03, and AlphaTauri AT04)
  - 2024 1.6 L RBPTH002 (Red Bull Racing RB20 and RB VCARB 01)
  - 2025 1.6 L RBPTH003 (Red Bull Racing RB21 and Racing Bulls VCARB 02)

=== V8 ===
- Honda turbocharged Indy V8 - 90° DOHC
  - 1986–2002 2.65 L
- HIR Indy V8 series - 90° DOHC
  - 2003 3.5 L HI3R (Dallara IR-03)
  - 2004 3.5 L HI4R (Dallara IR-03)
  - 2004 3.0 L HI4R-A (Dallara IR-03)
  - 2005 3.0 L HI5R (Dallara IR-03)
  - 2006 3.0 L HI6R (Dallara IR-03)
  - 2007 3.5 L HI7R (Dallara IR-05)
  - 2008 3.5 L HI8R (Dallara IR-05)
  - 2009 3.5 L HI9R (Dallara IR-05)
  - 2010 3.5 L HI10R (Dallara IR-05)
  - 2011 3.5 L HI11R (Dallara IR-05)
- Honda Formula 1 V8 - 90° DOHC
  - 1968 3.0 L RA302E
  - 2006 2.4 L RA806E
  - 2007 2.4 L RA807E
  - 2008 2.4 L RA808E
- LM-AR6
  - 2007 3.4 L (Acura ARX-01)
  - 2012 3.4 L (HPD ARX-03)
- LM-AR7
  - 2009 4.0 L (Acura ARX-02)
- Honda HR-09E/HR-10EG - 90° DOHC
  - 2009–2013 3.4 L HR-09E (Swift 017.n)
  - 2010–2013 3.4 L HR-10EG (Honda HSV-010 GT)

=== V10 ===
- Honda Formula 1 V10 - 72°-90° DOHC
  - 1989 3.5 L RA109E (McLaren MP4/5)
  - 1990 3.5 L RA100E (McLaren MP4/5B)
  - 2000 3.0 L RA000E (BAR 002)
  - 2001 3.0 L RA001E (BAR 003 and Jordan EJ11)
  - 2002 3.0 L RA002E (BAR 004 and Jordan EJ12)
  - 2003 3.0 L RA003E (BAR 005)
  - 2004 3.0 L RA004E (BAR 006)
  - 2005 3.0 L RA005E (BAR 007)

=== V12 ===
- Honda Formula 1 V12 - 60°-75° DOHC
  - 1964 1.5 L RA271E
  - 1965 1.5 L RA272E
  - 1966/1967 3.0 L RA273E
  - 1967/1968 3.0 L RA273E
  - 1968 3.0 L RA273E
  - 1991 3.5 L RA121E
  - 1992 3.5 L RA122E/B

== Motorcycle, ATV and watercraft ==
=== 1-cylinder ===
Engine	Year	Type	Volume cm^{3}	Ratio Com-pre-ssion	Bore*Stroke (mm)	Ignition	Induction	Transmission	Power (hp)	Body
Honda CRF 50	?	Four-stroke, SOHC 2-valve, Single-Cylinder, Air-cooled	49.00	10.0 : 1	39.0 x 41.4	CDI	Carburetor 13.0 mm	Centrifugal Clutch (three-speed transmission)	2.35	Honda CRF 50
Honda CRF 70	?	Four-stroke, SOHC 2-valve, Single-Cylinder, Air-cooled	72.00	9.0 : 1	47.0 x 41.4	CDI	Carburetor 13.0 mm	?	3.45 Honda CRF 70	
Honda C70	1966–1986	Four-stroke, SOHC 2-valve, Single-Cylinder, Air-cooled	71.80	8.8 : 1	47.0 x 41.4	Points; CDI	Carburetor	3-speed, automatic, wet type	?	SuperCup C70, Astrea C700
Honda CD 70	1970–Present	Four-stroke, SOHC 2-valve, Single-Cylinder, Air-cooled	72.00	9.3:1	47.0 x 41.4	CDI	Carburetor	4-speed manual	6.74	CD70, CD70 Dream
Honda CRF 80	?	Four-stroke, SOHC 2-valve, Single-Cylinder, Air-cooled	80.00	9.7 : 1	47.5 x 45.0	CDI	?	Automatic / Manual	8.50	Honda CRF 80
Honda C86	1984–1998	Four-stroke, SOHC 2-valve, Single-Cylinder, Air-cooled	85.80	9.4 : 1	47.0 x 49.5	CDI	Carburetor Keihin PB16	4-speed rotary, multiplate, automatic, centrifugal, wet type	?	Astrea 800, Astrea Star
Honda C90, S90, CL90, CD90z, CL90L, CT90	1960–?	Four-stroke, SOHC 2-valve, Single-Cylinder, Air-cooled	89.60	8.2 : 1	50.0 x 45.6	Points (Platina)	Carburetor	4-Speed, Manual, wet	CL90L- 4.9 CT90 - 7.0 C90 -7.5 S90/CL90 - 8.0	SuperCub C90, Honda S90, Honda 90Z,
Honda CRF100	?	Four-stroke, SOHC 2-valve, Single-Cylinder, Air-cooled	99.00	9.4 : 1	53.0 x 45.0	CDI	Carburetion 22.0 mm piston-valve	Manual	?	Honda CRF100
Honda S110	1973–?	Four-stroke, SOHC 2-valve, Single-Cylinder, Air-cooled	109.00	9.2 : 1	47.0 x 49.5	Points (Platina)	Carburetor	Manual	?	Honda Benly
Honda CB100	1970–1982	Four-stroke, SOHC 2-valve, Single-Cylinder, Air-cooled	99.00	9.2 : 1	50.5 x 49.5	Points (Platina)	Carburetor	5-Speed, Manual, wet	11.5 hp @ 10.500 rpm	Honda CB 100; Honda CL100 Scrambler
Honda GL100 (ASIA)	1979–1996	Four-stroke, SOHC 2-valve, Single-Cylinder, Air-cooled	105.00	9.2 : 1	52.0 x 49.5	Points (1979–1984); CDI (1985–1995)	Carburetor Keihin PK 28	5-Speed, Manual, wet	12 hp @ 10.000rpm	Honda GL 100
Engine	Year	Type	Volume	Ratio	Bore*Stroke (mm)	Ignition	Induction	Transmission	Power (hp)	Body
Honda C100/ C102	1960–?	Four-stroke, OHV 2-valve, Single-Cylinder, Air-cooled	49	8.5 : 1	40 x 39	Points	Carburetor	Automatic, 3-Speed	4.5 bhp	SuperCub C100
Honda C100EX	1986–2003	Four-stroke, SOHC 2-valve, Single-Cylinder, Air-cooled	97.00	9.0 : 1	50.0 x 49.50	AC-CDI	Carburetor Keihin PB 16 mm	4-speed rotary, multiplate, automatic, centrifugal, wet type	8.77 hp @ 9000 rpm	Wave 100, Dream100, Astrea Prima, Astrea Grand, Supra X 100,
Honda NF 100 (successor)	2002–Present	Four-stroke, SOHC 2-valve, Single-Cylinder, Air-cooled	97.00	9.0 : 1	50.0 x 49.50	AC-CDI; DC-CDI	Carburetor Keihin 5 (16 mm); PGM-Fi	4-speed rotary, multiplate, automatic or Manual, centrifugal, wet type	7.19 hp @ 8000 rpm	Wave100, Dream100, SupraFit, FitX, Revo.; SupraXX, SupraV, (Manual); -Ex5, SuperCub C100 2018 (Fi)
Honda CD100	1984–Present	Four-stroke, SOHC 2-valve, Single-Cylinder, Air-cooled	97.00	9.0 : 1	50.0 x 49.50	AC-CDI	Carburetor Keihin Ventury PB18	4-Speed manual centrifugal wet type (N-1-2-3-4)	7.5 hp @ 8500 rpm	Honda Pridor, Honda Win
Honda RS110 NOVA	1994–2005	Two-stroke, Reed-Valve, Single-Cylinder, Air-Cooled	109.00	6.5 : 1	52.0 x 49.5	DC-CDI	Carburetor	5-Speed, Manual, wet type (1-N-2-3-4-5)	11.8 hp @ 11.000 rpm	Nova Tena RS110
Honda NF11A1C	2008–2010	Four-stroke, SOHC 2-valve, Single-Cylinder, Air-cooled	109.10	9.0 : 1	50.0 x 55.6	DC-CDI	Carburetor Keihin venturi 17	4-speed rotary, automatic, double plate, centrifugal, wet.	8.53 hp @ 7500 rpm	Honda Blade 110R, CZ-i, WaveDash 110R
Honda NF11B & NF11C	2008–Present	Four-stroke, SOHC 2-valve, Single-Cylinder, Air-cooled	109.10	9.0 : 1 9:3 : 1	50.0 x 55.6	DC-CDI; ECU	Carburetor Keihin venturi 17 (NF11Bxxxx); PGM-Fi (NF11Cxxxx)	4-speed rotary, automatic, multi-plate, centrifugal, wet.	8.34 hp @ 7500 rpm	Honda Revo series, Wave 110, New Blade 110 Fi, Wave Fi,
Honda NC11XXXX	2004–Present	Four-stroke, SOHC 2-valve, Single-Cylinder, Air-cooled with Electric Fan or Liquid-cooled (Click Series)	109.10	9.2 : 1 9.3 : 1 10.7 : 1	50.0 x 55.6	DC-CDI	Vacuum Carburetor Ventury VK22; Ventury CV22 (Vario; Click); PGM-Fi	Automatic with V-Matic Transmission, dry	8.34 hp @ 7500 rpm	-Honda Vario, Click 110 series (using radiator) -Honda i-CON, BeAT, Vision, Scoopy, Spacy, Activa 110, Ellite 110. DIO 110 -Honda Revo-AT, Scooter AT
Engine	Year	Type	Volume	Ratio	Bore*Stroke (mm)	Ignition	Induction	Transmission	Power (hp)	Body
Honda RS125 Nova	1994–2004	Two-Stroke, Single-Cylinder, Liquid Cooled	123.50	6.8 : 1	55.5 x 52.0	DC-CDI	Keihin PE 24	Manual, 6-Speed, wet	20 hp @ 11.000 rpm	Honda Nova Dash RS125, LS125
Honda NF125	2003–2013	Four-stroke, SOHC 2-valve, Single-Cylinder, Air-cooled.	124.89	9.3 : 1	52.4 x 57.9	DC-CDI	Keihin Venturi PB 18mm;	4-speed rotary, automatic, multi-plate, centrifugal, wet.	8.6 hp @ 9000 rpm	Wave 125, Supra X 125, Karisma, Kirana, Innova 125, Nice RS 125.
Honda NF125	2005–2013	Four-stroke, SOHC 2-valve, Single-Cylinder, Air-cooled.	124.89	9.3 : 1	52.4 x 57.9	ECU	PGM-Fi	4-speed rotary, automatic, multi-plate, centrifugal, wet.	8.6 hp @ 9000 rpm	Supra X 125 Fi
Honda KYZ NF125	2012–Present	Four-stroke, SOHC 2-valve, Single-Cylinder, Air-cooled.	124.89	9.3 : 1	52.4 x 57.9	ECU	PGM-Fi	4-speed rotary, automatic, multi-plate, centrifugal, wet.	9,3 hp @ 8000 rpm	Blade Fi 125, Wave 125, WaveDash 125, All New Supra X 125 Fi, SupraX 125 Helm in, MSX, SuperCub C125, Nice RS 125 Fi
FS125 (Thailand)	2003-	Four-stroke, DOHC 4-valve, Single-Cylinder, Liquid-cooled + electric fan	124.70	: 1	58.0 x 47.2	DC-CDI	Carburetor Vacuum Keihin VK28	6-Speed, 1-N-2-3-4-5-6 Manual clutch-wet	12.8 hp @ 10.000 rpm	Honda Nova Sonic RS 125
CS125 (Indonesia)	2008–2013	Four-stroke, SOHC 2-valve, Single-Cylinder, Liquid-cooled + electric fan	124.70	: 1	58.0 x 47.2	DC-CDI	Carburetor Vacuum Keihin VK28	5-Speed, 1-N-2-3-4-5 Manual clutch-wet	10.7 hp @ 10.000 rpm	Honda City Sport CS-1 (Indonesia)
CBR125R	2004–Present	Four-stroke, SOHC 2-valve, Single-Cylinder, Liquid-cooled + electric fan	124.70	11.0 : 1	58.0 x 47.2	?	Vacuum Keihin VK28; Fuel Injection	6-Speed, 1-N-2-3-4-5-6 Manual clutch-wet	13.6 hp @ 10.000 rpm	Honda CBR125R
Honda NC12A	2010–Present	Four-stroke, SOHC 2-valve, Single-Cylinder, Liquid-cooled + electric fan	124.80	11.0 : 1	52,4 x 57,9	DC-CDI	Programmed Fuel-Injection (PGM-Fi)	Automatic w/ V-Matic, centrifugal, dry	10.5 hp @ 8500 rpm	Honda Matic 125 (Vario 125, Click 125)
Honda CB125	1970–1980	Four-stroke, SOHC 2-valve, Single-Cylinder, Air-cooled,	124.00	9.0 : 1	?	Points	Carburetor	5-Speed, 1-N-2-3-4-5 Manual clutch-wet	?	Honda CB 125
Honda GL125	1979–1994	Four-stroke, SOHC 2-valve, Single-Cylinder, Air-cooled,	124.00	9.0 : 1	56.50 x 49.50	Points (79-84); CDI (85-94)	Carburetor PK28	5-Speed, 1-N-2-3-4-5 Manual clutch-wet	1976-Present	GL125; GL-MAX (Asia Market); CB125JX (Japan)
Honda CG 125	1976-Present	Four-stroke, SOHV 2-valve, Single-Cylinder, Air-cooled,	124.00	9.0 : 1	56.50 x 49.50	Points; CDI	Carburetor	5-Speed, 1-N-2-3-4-5 Manual clutch-wet	11 hp	CG125 CG125SE
Engine	Year	Type	Volume	Ratio	Bore*Stroke (mm)	Ignition	Induction	Transmission	Power (hp)	Body
GL125 (NeoTech 1250)	1995–2005	Four-stroke, SOHC 2-valve, Single-Cylinder, Air-cooled,	124.10	9.2 : 1	56.50 x 49.50	DC-CDI	Carburetor Keihin PD 22 mm	5-Speed, 1-N-2-3-4-5 Manual clutch-wet	?	GL-Max NeoTech 1250
GL145	1985–1993	Four-stroke, SOHC 2-valve, Single-Cylinder, Air-cooled,	144.00	9.2 : 1	61.00 x 49.50	CDI	Carburetor	5-Speed, 1-N-2-3-4-5 Manual clutch-wet	15 hp @ 8.500 RPM	GL-PRO CDI 145cc (Indonesia)
GL145 Black Engine Japan	1992–1995	Four-stroke, SOHC 2-valve, Single-Cylinder, Air-cooled,	144.00	9.3 : 1	61.00 x 49.50	CDI	Carburetor	5-Speed, 1-N-2-3-4-5 Manual clutch-wet	16 hp @ 8.500 RPM	GL-PRO Black Engine CDI (Asia)
Honda NS150	1994–2003	Two-Stroke, Single-Cylinder, Liquid Cooled with RC-Valve	149.00	6.8 : 1	59.0 x 54.5	DC-CDI	Keihin PE28	6-Speed, 1-N-2-3-4-5-6 Manual clutch-wet	38 hp @ 10.000 rpm	Honda NSR150; Honda FSX 150; Honda Phanthom 150
Honda CBR150R (Thailand)	2003-2015	Four-stroke, DOHC-4valve, Single Cylinder, Liquid-cooled	149.4	11.3 : 1	63.5 x 47.2	DC-CDI	Vacuum Carburetor VK28	6-Speed, 1-N-2-3-4-5-6 Manual clutch-wet	18 hp @ 10.500 rpm	Honda CBR150R
Honda K15	2013–Present	Four-stroke, DOHC-4valve, Single Cylinder, Liquid-cooled	149.16	11.3 : 1	57.30 x 57.80	DC-CDI	PGM-Fi	6-speed 1-N-2-3-4-5-6, Manual clutch-wet.	16.5 hp @ 9000 rpm	Honda CB150R StreetFire
Honda K45 CBR150R	2014–Present	Four-stroke, DOHC-4valve, Single Cylinder, Liquid-cooled	149.16	11.3 : 1	57.30 x 57.80	DC-CDI	PGM-Fi	6-speed 1-N-2-3-4-5-6, Manual clutch-wet.	17 hp @ 10.5000 rpm	Honda CBR150R (Indonesia)
Honda K56	2015–Present	Four-stroke, DOHC-4valve, Single Cylinder, Liquid-cooled	149.16	11.3 : 1	57.30 x 57.80	DC-CDI	PGM-Fi	6-speed 1-N-2-3-4-5-6, Manual clutch-wet.	15.5 hp @ 9000 rpm	Honda New Sonic 150R; All New Supra X 150 GTR; Winner 150R
Honda GL150	2013–Present	Four-stroke, SOHC 2-valve, Single-Cylinder, Air-cooled.	149.16	9.5 :1	57.30 x 57.80	ECU	PGM-Fi	5-Speed Manual clutch, wet	11.5 hp	Honda Verza 150 Fi
Honda GL150	2010–Present	Four-stroke, SOHC 2-valve, Single-Cylinder, Air-cooled.	149.16	9.5 :1	57.30 x 57.80	ECU	PGM-Fi	5-Speed Manual clutch, wet	12.5 hp	Honda CRF150L; Honda New Mega Pro; GL150
Honda GL150	2010–Present	Four-stroke, SOHC 2-valve, Single-Cylinder, Air-cooled.	147.70	11.7 : 1	66.00 x 43.70	DC-CDI	Carburetor Keihin 32mm	Close ratio 5-Speed Manual clutch, wet	?	Honda CRF150R
Honda GL160 (NeoTech 1600)	1995–2009	Four-stroke, SOHC 2-valve, Single-Cylinder, Air-cooled.	156.90	9.2 : 1	63.50 x 49.70	CDI	Carburetor Keihin PD 22 mm	5-Speed Manual clutch, wet	14.7 hp @ 8500 rpm	Honda GL-PRO NeoTech 1600, Mega Pro 1600, MegaPro GL1600, CBZ160
Honda GL200	1993–2012	Four-stroke, SOHC 2-valve, Single-Cylinder, Air-cooled.	196.90	9.2 : 1	63.50 x 62.20	CDI	Carburetor Keihin PD 22 mm	6-Speed Manual clutch, wet	16.3 hp @ 8500 rpm	Tiger 2000, NX 200, CTX 200; Honda Phantom 200
Honda CRF230	?	Four-stroke, SOHC 2-valve, Single-Cylinder, Air-cooled.	223.00	9.0 : 1	65.50 x 66.20	CDI	Carburetion 26 mm piston-valve	?	?	Honda CRF 230
Honda CRF250X	?	Four-stroke, SOHC Unicam 4-valve, Single-Cylinder, Liquid-cooled.	249.00	12.5 :1	78.00 x 52.20	DC-CDI	Carburetion Keihin 37.0 mm flat-slide with throttle position sensor (TPS)	?	29hp	Honda CRF250X

=== 2-cylinder ===
- Honda MC51E (CBR250RR)
  - Production 2017–Present
  - Engine 249 cm^{3} liquid-cooled, DOHC 8-valve (4 valve per-cylinder), Inline-Twin Cylinder, 4 Stroke.
  - Bore x Stroke 62.0×41.3 mm
  - Compression Ratio 11.5 : 1
  - Induction type Programmed Fuel-Injection (PGM-Fi)
  - Power 38.7 PS @ 12.500 rpm
  - Features : Throttle by Wire, Riding Mode., Starter Electric Only
- Honda CX500
  - Engine Type 498cc liquid-cooled two-cylinder "Flying V-Twin" four-stroke
  - Bore and Stroke 78.0 mm x 52.0 mm
  - Compression Ratio 10.0:1
  - Valve Train OHV Cam-in-block; four-valve-per-cylinder
  - Carburetion Twin Keihin 40.0 mm butterfly with manual choke
  - Ignition Triple-wound stator, low speed, high speed, and charging, transistor ignition
  - Starter Electric only
- Honda CB500
  - Engine Type 499cc liquid-cooled two-cylinder "Parallel-twin" four-stroke
  - Bore & Stroke 73 mm × 59.5 mm
  - Compression Ratio 10.5:1
  - Valve Train DOHC chain-driven four-valve-per-cylinder
  - Carburetion Two 34mm Keihin flat-slide VPs carburetors with manual choke
  - Ignition Dual-coil CDI
  - Starter Electric only

=== V4-cylinder ===
- Honda VFR800(A) (RC46) (2002–2009)
  - Engine Type 781cc liquid-cooled four-stroke 90-degree DOHC V4
  - Bore and Stroke 72 mm x 48 mm
  - Compression Ratio 11.6:1
  - Valve Train VTEC chain-driven DOHC, 4 valves per cylinder
  - earlier versions were non-VTEC, gear driven DOHC, 4 valves /cylinder

Pre-cat converter delivered 110 BHP

Fuel Delivery PGM-FI fuel injection

Starter Electric only

- Honda VFR1200(F) (2009-2017)
  - 1,237cc (75.5cu in) liquid-cooled four-stroke 76-degree UNICAM V4
  - 127kW (170hp) @ 10,000rpm and 129N⋅m (95lb⋅ft) @8,750rpm
  - Bore and Stroke 81 mm × 60 mm (3.2 in × 2.4 in)
  - Compression ratio 12.0:1
  - Perfect primary balance, no balance shaft

=== 6-cylinder ===
The Honda CBX motorcycle (1978–1982) contains a 1047cc inline-6-cylinder engine. The engine used a DOHC 24-valve cam-over-bucket valvetrain to support high RPMs.

=== V8-cylinder ===
The Honda Marine BF350 is Honda's first commercially available V8. The water-cooled outboard motor is designed for 25-feet+ boats. It has a displacement of 4952 cc (302 ci) and produces 350 HP at 5500 RPM.

== Power equipment ==
=== General-purpose engines ===
Current Honda general-purpose engines are air-cooled 4-stroke gasoline engines but 2-stroke, Diesel, water-cooled engines were also manufactured in the past. The current engine range provide from 1 to 22 hp (0.7 to 16.5 kW).

More than 5 million general-purpose engines were manufactured by Honda in 2009.
Approximately 70% of the general-purpose engines manufactured by Honda are supplied as OEM engines to other manufacturers of power products.

Current range (US & Europe)

1-cylinder

- GX series
  - Horizontal shaft
    - GX100 (OHC) (2002–) (98cc)
    - GX120 (OHV) (1991–) (118cc)
    - GXR120 (OHV) (2013–) (121cc)
    - GX160 (OHV) (1991–) (163cc)
    - GX200 (OHV) (1995–) (196cc)
    - GX240 (OHV) (1986–) (270cc)
    - GX270 (OHV) (1991–) (270cc)
    - GX340 (OHV) (1986–) (389cc)
    - GX390 (OHV) (1991–) (389cc)
  - Vertical shaft
    - GXV160 (OHV) (1987–) (163cc)
    - GXV340 (OHV) (1986–) (337cc)
    - GXV390 (OHV) (1990–) (389cc)
- iGX series
  - Horizontal shaft
    - iGX240 (OHV) (2010–)
    - iGX270 (OHV) (2010–)
    - iGX340 (OHV) (2010–) (388cc)
    - iGX390 (OHV) (2010–) (389cc)
    - iGX440 (OHC) (2005–) (438cc)
- GC/GS series (OHC)
  - Horizontal shaft
    - GC160 (1997–) (160cc)
    - GC190 (2003–) (187cc)
    - GS190 (2004–) (187cc)
  - Vertical shaft
    - GCV160 (1997–) (160cc)
    - GCV190 (2003–) (187cc)
    - GSV190 (2004–) (187cc)
- GP series (OHV) (European market)
  - Horizontal shaft
    - GP160 (?–) (163cc)
    - GP200 (?–) (196cc)
- Mini 4-stroke series
  - Horizontal shaft
    - GX25 (OHC) (2002–) (25cc)
    - GX35 (OHC) (2005–) (35cc)
    - GXH50 (OHV) (1999–) (49cc)
  - Vertical shaft
    - GXV50 (OHV) (1999–) (49cc)
    - GXV57 (OHV) (?–) (57cc) (European market)

2-cylinder (V-Twin)

- GX series
  - Horizontal shaft
    - GX630 (OHV) (2009–) (688cc)
    - GX660 (OHV) (2009–) (688cc)
    - GX690 (OHV) (2009–) (688cc)
  - Vertical shaft
    - GXV530 (OHC) (2003–) (530cc)
    - GXV630 (OHV) (2009–) (688cc)
    - GXV660 (OHV) (2009–) (688cc)
    - GXV690 (OHV) (2009–) (688cc)
- GC series (OHC)
  - Vertical shaft
    - GCV520 (2003–) (530cc)
    - GCV530 (2003–) (530cc)
- HD series (diesel)
    - HD6500 (G390) (2004–)
    - HD7500 (G395) (2004–)

Past models

- Early models (all 1-cylinder, air-cooled)
  - type-H (1953–?) (2-st., 50cc)
  - type-T (1954–?) (4-st., side-valve, 130cc)
  - type-VN (1956–?) (4-st., side-valve, 172cc)
  - T10 (1962–?) (4-st., side-valve, 19.7cc) (training purpose only, not marketed)
  - G20 (1963–?) (4-st., side-valve, 132cc)
  - G25 (1966–1969) (4-st., OHC, 59cc)
  - G28 (1969–1977) (4-st., OHC, 67cc)
  - G35 (1976–1980) (4-st., side-valve, 144cc)
  - GV35 (1976–1979)
  - G40 (?–1969) (4-st., side-valve, 170cc)
  - G41 (1970) (4-st., side-valve, 171cc)
  - G42 (1972–1979) (4-st., side-valve, 170cc)
  - G45 (?–1968)
  - G50 (1970–1978) (4-st., side-valve, 187cc)
  - GT50 (?–?) (4-st., side-valve, 187cc) (kerosene type)
  - G65 (?–1979) (4-st., side-valve, 240cc)
  - GS65 (1976–1977)
  - G80 (1979) (4-st., side-valve, 296cc)
- G series (1-cylinder, air-cooled, side-valve)
  - Horizontal shaft
    - G100 (1981–2002) (97cc)
    - G150 (1978–2003) (144cc)
    - G200 (1978–2003) (197cc)
    - G300 (1978–?) (272cc)
    - G400 (1978–?) (406cc)
  - Vertical shaft
    - GV100 (1990–2003) (76cc on K0 version, then 97cc on K1 and K2))
    - GV150 (1979–1991) (144cc)
    - GV200 (1979–1991) (197cc)
    - GV400 (1979–1986) (406cc)
- GX series (1-cylinder, OHV)
  - Horizontal shaft
    - GX110 (1983–?) (107cc)
    - GX140 (1983–?) (144cc)
  - Vertical shaft
    - GXV110 (?–?) (110cc)
    - GXV120 (1984–?) (118cc)
    - GXV140 (1991–2001) (135,1cc)
    - GXV270 (1986–2003) (270cc)
- GC series (1-cylinder, OHC)
  - Horizontal shaft
    - GC135 (1997–?) (135cc)
  - Vertical shaft
    - GCV135 (1997–?) (135cc)
- Mini 4-stroke series (OHV)
  - GX22 (1997–2002) (22,2cc)
  - GX31 (1997–2005) (31cc)
- GX series (2-cylinder in line, water-cooled, OHC)
  - Horizontal shaft
    - GX360 (1989–) (359cc)
    - GX640 (1994–?) (635cc)
- GX series (2-cylinder V-twin, air-cooled, OHV)
  - Horizontal shaft
    - GX610 (1994–2009) (614cc)
    - GX620 (1993–2009) (614cc)
    - GX670 (2001–2009) (670cc)
  - Vertical shaft
    - GXV610 (1995–2009) (614cc)
    - GXV620 (1995–2009) (614cc)
    - GXV670 (2001–2009) (670cc)
- GD series (Diesel)
  - Horizontal shaft
- GD320 (1990–1995) (1-cylinder, air-cooled, OHV) (317cc)
- GD321 (1994–2002) (1-cylinder, air-cooled, OHV) (317cc)
- GD410 (1989–1995) (1-cylinder, air-cooled, OHV) (411cc)
- GD411 (1994–2005) (1-cylinder, air-cooled, OHV) (411cc)
- GD1100 (1990–?) (3-cylinder in line, water-cooled, OHC) (1061cc)
- GD1250 (1990–?) (3-cylinder in line, water-cooled, OHC) (1061cc)

=== Marine engines (current range) ===
- 1-cylinder (OHV)
  - BF2.3, BF5
- 2-cylinder (OHC)
  - BF8, BF10, BF15, BF20
- 3-cylinder (OHC)
  - BF25, BF30 (552cc, 6-valve)
  - BF40, BF50 (808cc, 6-valve)
  - BF60 (998cc, 12-valve)
- 4-cylinder (in-line, 1496cc, SOHC, based on L15 automotive engine)
  - BF75, BF90, BF100 (VTEC)
- 4-cylinder (in-line, 2354cc, DOHC, based on K24 automotive engine)
  - BF115 (new), BF140, BF150 (VTEC)
- 6-cylinder (V6, 3471cc, SOHC, based on J35 automotive engine)
  - BF200, BF225, BF250 (VTEC)
- 8-cylinder (V8, 4952cc, SOHC)
  - BF350 (VTEC)

== Aircraft ==
- GE Honda HF120 (with General Electric)

== See also ==
- Earth Dreams Technology
