= Honda B20A engine =

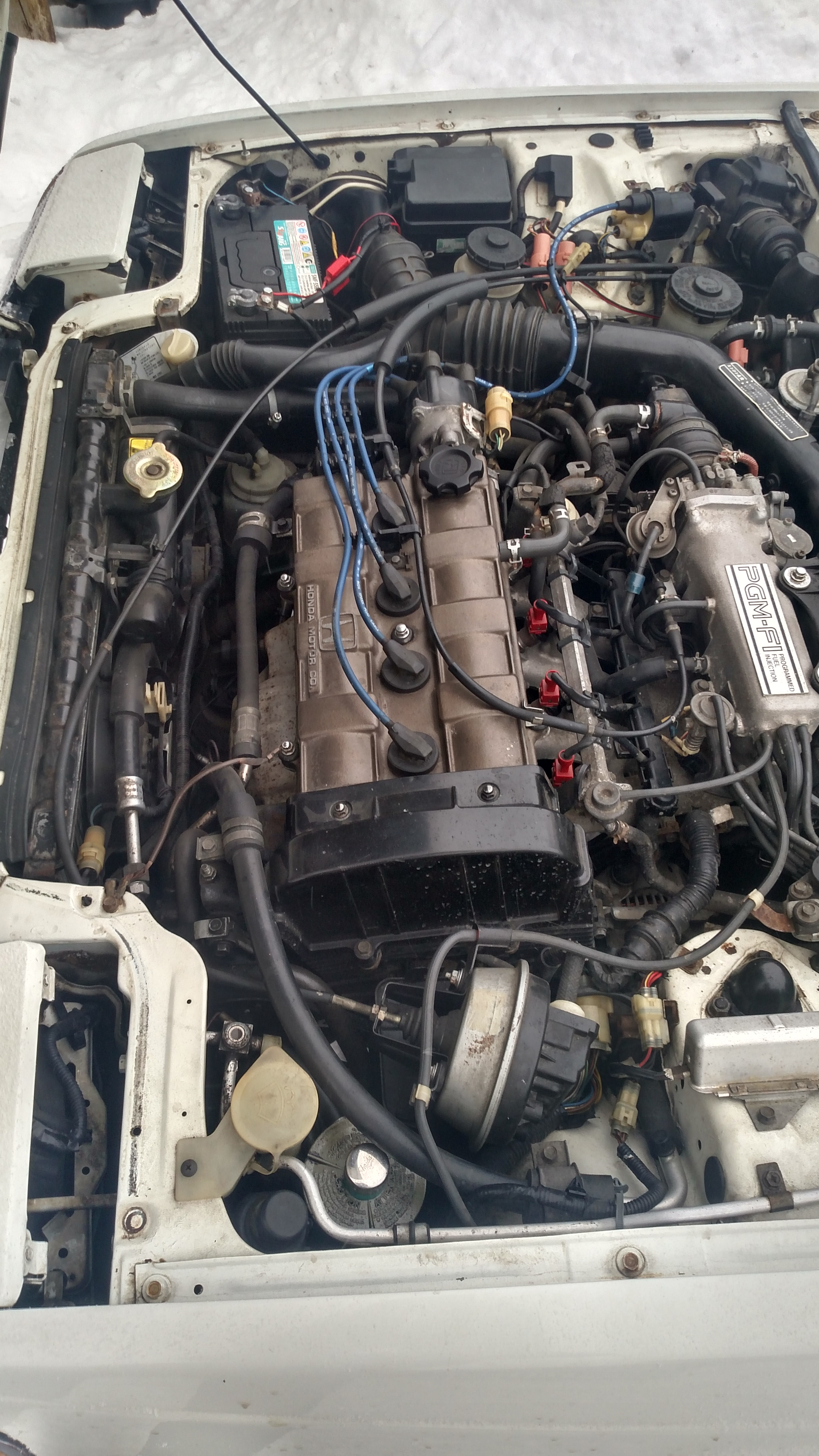

Overview
- Manufacturer: Honda
- Production: 1985–1991

Layout
- Configuration: DOHC and SOHC inline-four

Chronology
- Successor: Honda B engine

The Honda B20A engine series, known as the B20A and B21A, was an inline four-cylinder engine family from Honda introduced in 1985 in the second-generation Honda Prelude. Also available in the contemporary third-generation Honda Accord in the Japanese domestic market, along with the Accord-derived Vigor, the B20A was Honda's second line of multivalve DOHC inline four-cylinder engines behind the ZC twin-cam variant of the ordinarily SOHC D-series engine, focused towards performance and displacing 2.0 to 2.1 litres.

The third-generation Prelude was exclusively powered by the B20A engine family and production of the B20A engine family ended with the conclusion of the production of the third-generation Prelude in 1991.

== History ==
The B20A would be succeeded by the Honda B engine family. Although sharing similar nomenclature and some design elements, the earlier B20A substantially differs from the later B-series in architecture enough to be considered two different engine families and is also not to be confused with the B20B, a 2.0 liter DOHC engine introduced alongside the Honda CR-V in 1994.

There were two versions of the B20A:

- The first generation of B20A engines was available in the 85–87 Prelude 2.0SI in Japan and in Europe, the 86–89 Honda Vigor and Accord. It leaned towards the front of the car just like the A20A engine found in the same cars. This B20A produces 160 PS (118 kW) and 140 lb⋅ft (190 N⋅m) torque in Japan. In Europe this is called B20A1, producing 137 hp (102 kW) and 127 lb.ft (172 Nm).
- The second generation of B20A was found in the 87–91 Prelude. The 87–91 Prelude B20A and B21A blocks are cast so they lie at an 18-degree angle leaning towards the firewall. This was done to please the exterior specifications for the 1988–1991 3rd Generation Prelude due to its ultra-low hood line which Honda dubs the "engineless design" and also for handling reasons; placing the engine at an angle gives it a lower center of gravity (similar to straight 6 designs in older BMW's).

There was also a similar engine named B18A for the 86–89 Accords and Vigors. It was a de-stroked B20A powered by two side-draft Keihin carburetors.

All B20A engines consisted of closed-deck aluminium blocks with thicker-than-average iron sleeves whereas the B21A1 had FRM (fiber reinforced metal) cylinder liners.

The B21A1 was basically a re-worked B20A5 with an increase in bore to 83 mm (3.3 in). The external block dimensions had to stay identical (although there was increased external strengthening and webbing on the B21) to the B20A5 block so Honda called upon Saffil to create a thin but strong cylinder liner using FRM (fiber reinforced metal) which consisted of a carbon fiber matrix, aluminium alloy, and aluminium oxide to make a very strong cylinder sleeve. The sleeve is so strong, in fact, that it wears out the piston rings, causing low compression numbers, severe smoking, and high oil usage. It is possible in many situations to merely replace the worn rings in order to revive the motor's former output. Many machine shops will not attempt to re-hone or re-bore the FRM sleeves, as this type of sleeve will de-laminate during machining operations.

== B18A ==
The original B18A is a short-stroked version of the B20A. It is not considered to be part of the modern B-series family, despite sharing its dimensions with the later B18A1.

(16-valve, DOHC, dual side-draft carburetors)

- Found in:
  - 1986–1989 Honda Accord Aerodeck LXR-S/LX-S (Japan)
  - 1986–1989 Honda Accord EXL-S/EX-S (Japan)
  - 1986–1989 Honda Vigor MXL-S (Japan)
    - Displacement: 1.8 L; 111.9 cu in (1,834 cc)
    - Compression: 9.7:1
    - Bore x Stroke: 81 mm × 89 mm (3.19 in × 3.50 in)
    - Dual Keihin carburetors
    - Power: 100 PS (74 kW; 99 hp) at 6100 RPM & 128 lb⋅ft (174 N⋅m) at 4700 RPM
    - Transmission: A2N5, E2N5

== B20A, B20A1 ==
(16-valve, DOHC, PGM-FI)

- "Honda" logo in center of valve cover – Filler cap on left side of cover.
- Found in:
  - Serial numbers 1000001~, 1500001~ and 1550001~
    - 1985–1987.03 Honda Prelude Non-U.S.
    - 1985.06–1987.04 Honda Accord Non-U.S.
    - 1985.06–1987.04 Honda Vigor Non-U.S.
  - Serial numbers 1600001~ and 1640001~
    - 1987.05–1989.08 Honda Accord Non-U.S.
    - 1987.05–1989.08 Honda Vigor Non-U.S.
- Displacement: 1958 cc
  - bore: 81 mm (3.2 in)
  - stroke: 95 mm (3.7 in)
- Compression: 9.4:1
- Power:
  - (JDM GOLD TOP B20A 1985.06–1987.04) 160 PS (118 kW) at 6300 rpm & 137 lb.ft (186 N·m) at 5000 rpm (!JIS Gross data), using PH3 ECU
  - (JDM BLACKTOP B20A 1987.05–1989.08) 145 PS (107 kW) at 6200 rpm & 127 lb.ft (173 N·m) at 4000 rpm (!JIS Net data with new dual-stage intake manifold), using PH3 ECU
  - (EDM, B20A1 Gold Top) 137 PS (101 kW) at 6000 rpm & 127 lb.ft (172 N·m) at 4000 rpm, using PJ5 (602,603,752), PJ7, PH3 ECU w vac. advance
- Transmission: B2K5(86–87), F2K5(88–89)

The B20A installed in 1988–1991 Preludes have the following specifications:

(16-valve, DOHC, PGM-FI)

- Found in:
  - 1987–1991 Honda Prelude 3rd gen Non-U.S.
- Power: 145 PS (107 kW) at 6000 rpm
- Torque: 128tq at 4500 rpm
- Compression ratio: 9.4:1

== B20A2 ==
(16-valve, DOHC, PGM-FI)

- Found in:
  - 1987–1989 Honda Accord (CA5), Europe
- Power: 137 PS (101 kW) at 6000 rpm

== B20A3 ==
(12-valve, SOHC, dual side-draft carburetors)

- Found in:
  - 1987–1990 Honda Prelude 3rd gen 2.0 S
- Power: 109 hp (81 kW) at 5800 rpm (MT) with catalytic converter, 115 hp (86 kW) at 5800 rpm without catalytic converter
- Torque: 111 lb⋅ft (150 N⋅m) at 4000 rpm
- It was PGM-CARB microprocessor controlled (pk-1)

== B20A4 ==
(12-valve, SOHC, dual side-draft carburetors)

- Found in: 1987–1991 Honda Prelude 3rd gen Non-U.S.
- Fuel system: 2 carburetors
- Displacement (cm3): 1958
- Bore x Stroke (mm): 81 x 95
- Compression ration: 9.2:1
- Maximum power: 114 hp at 5800 rpm
- Maximum torque: 116 ft lb at 4500 rpm
- Catalytic converter: no
- ECU: no

== B20A5 ==
(16-valve, DOHC, PGM-FI)

- Found in:
  - 1987–1991 Honda Prelude 3rd gen 2.0Si
- Power: 135 hp (101 kW) at 6200 rpm
- Torque: 127 lb⋅ft (172 N⋅m) at 4000 rpm
- Engine cc: 1958.14
- Cylinder cc: 489.535
- Deck cc: 13.885
- Head cc: 47.3
- Compression Ratio: 9.0:1

== B20A6 ==
(16-valve, DOHC, PGM-FI)

- Found in:
  - 1987–1991 Honda Prelude 3rd gen Non-U.S. and Australian Domestic Market

142 hp (106 kW) at 6000 rpm 174 Nm at 4500 rpm KY model is one of them

== B20A7 ==
(16-valve, DOHC, PGM-FI)

- Found in:
  - 1987–1991 Honda Prelude 3rd gen Non-U.S. UK, France, Holland, Norway, South Africa, New Zealand
- Power 150 PS (110 kW) at 6000 rpm
- Torque 132tq (180 Nm) at 5500rpm
- Compression ratio 10.5:1
- Bore 81 mm
- Stroke 95 mm
- Engine capacity 1958 cm3 or 119.5 cu-in

== B20A8 ==
(16-valve, DOHC, PGM-FI)

- Found in:
  - 1987–1991 Honda Prelude 3rd gen Non-U.S. Russian, Swedish Domestic Market
  - 1988–1989 Honda Accord Non-U.S.
- Power 133 PS (98 kW) at 6000 rpm

== B20A9 ==
(16-valve, DOHC, PGM-FI)

- Found in:
  - 1990–1991 Honda Prelude 3rd gen Non-U.S. Finland, Germany, Norway, Netherlands, Russia, Argentina
- Power 139 hp (104 kW) at 6000 rpm
- Torque 129tq (175 Nm) at 4500 rpm
- Cylinder cc: 489.535
- Deck cc: 13.885
- Head cc: 47.3
- Compression ratio 9,3:1
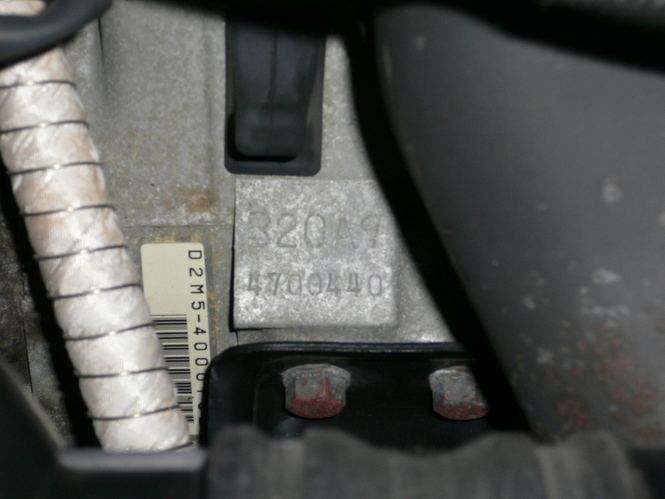
B20A9 engine code stamp

== B21A ==
(16-valve, DOHC, PGM-FI)

- Found in:
  - 1990–1991 Honda Prelude 3rd gen Si States
- Very rare, it was only produced for the "Si States" models in Japan
- Power: 145 PS (107 kW; 143 hp)
- Torque: 186 N·m (137 lb·ft)
- Compression Ratio: 9.4:1

engine using a pk-3 honda ECU

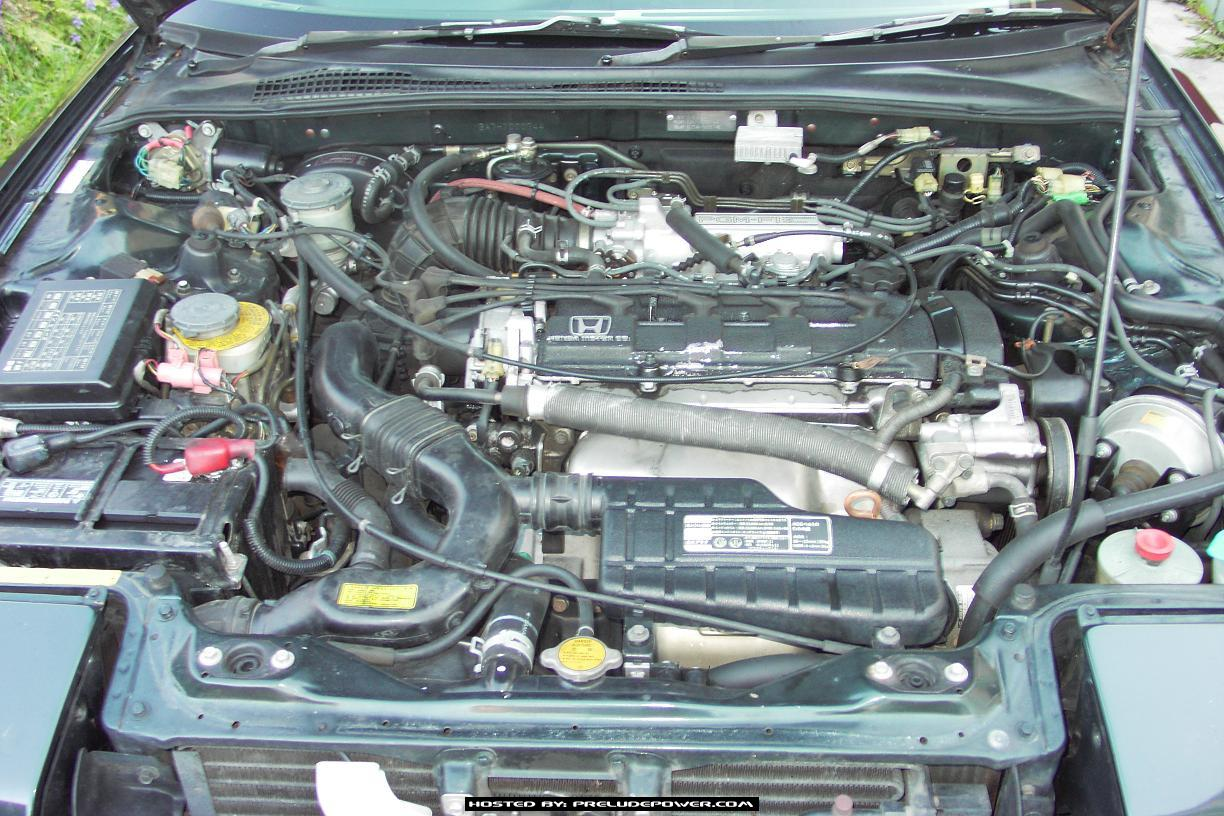
B21a

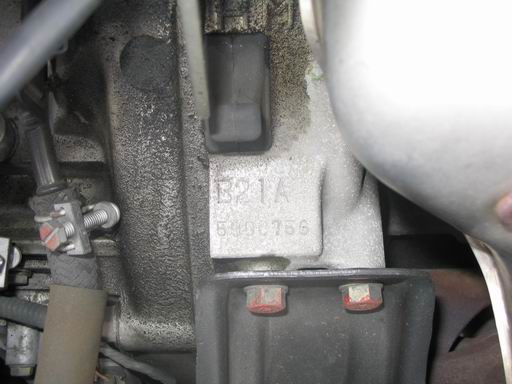
B21A engine code stamp

== B21A1 ==
(16-valve, DOHC, PGM-FI)

- Found in:
  - 1990–1991 Honda Prelude 3rd gen SI USDM
  - 1990–1991 Honda Prelude 3rd gen SR Canadian Market
- Power: 140 hp (104 kW; 142 PS) at 5800 rpm
- Torque: 135 lb⋅ft (183 N⋅m) at 5000 rpm
- Engine cc: 2056.03
- Bore 83 mm
- Stroke 95 mm
- Cylinder cc: 514.0075
- Deck cc: 10.191
- Head cc: 51.0
- Compression Ratio: 9.4:1
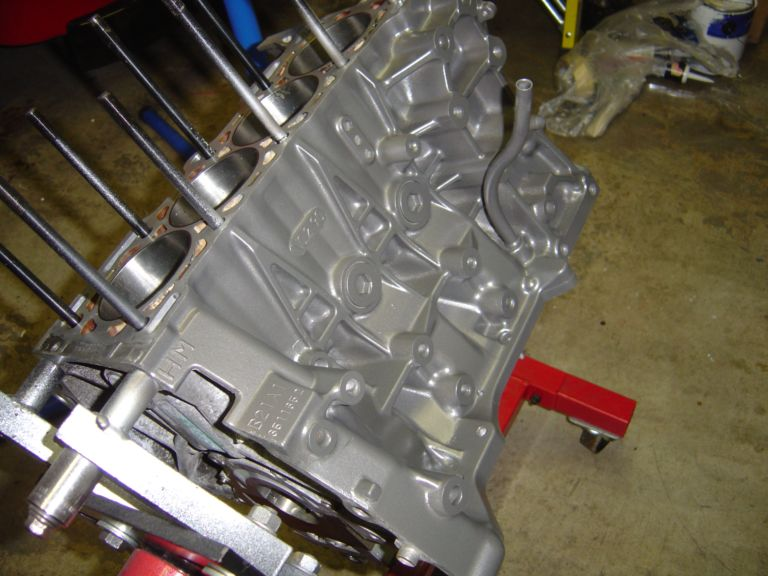
Block casting – FRONT

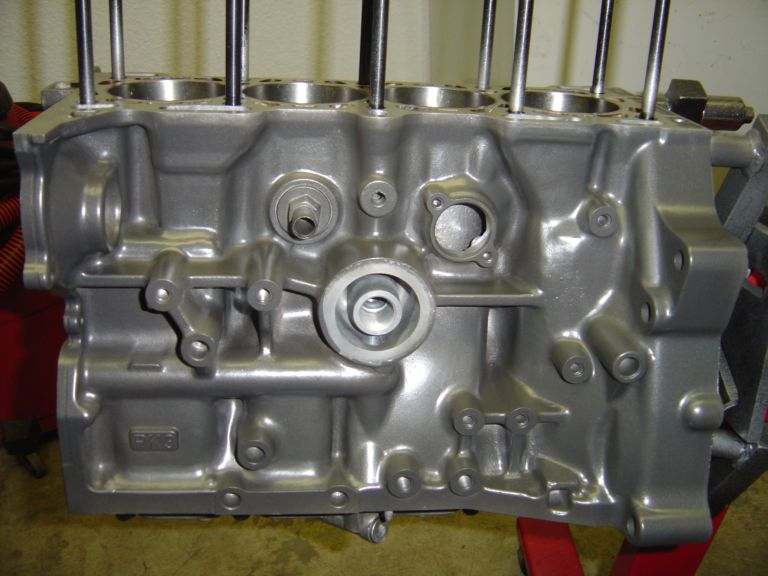
Block casting – REAR

== See also ==
- List of Honda engines
- Everything Prelude! Pictures, write-ups, product reviews...
- PreludePower.com
- 3Geez.com

== Sources ==
- 3rd gen Honda Prelude Engine's specification
- 3rd Generation Honda Prelude Engine Stats
