= Honda H engine =

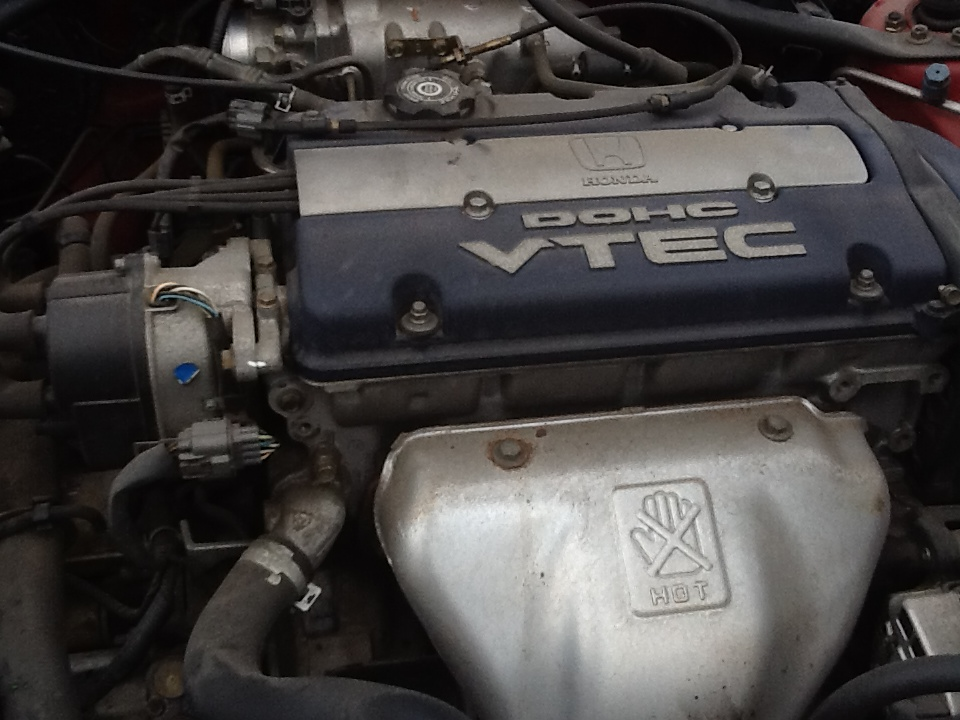
- Honda H23A-Accord SiR CH9

Overview
- Manufacturer: Honda
- Production: 1991–2002

Layout
- Configuration: Naturally aspirated Inline-4
- Displacement: 2.2–2.3 L; 131.6–137.9 cu in (2,157–2,259 cc)
- Cylinder bore: 87 mm (3.43 in)
- Piston stroke: 90.7 mm (3.57 in); 95 mm (3.74 in)
- Cylinder block material: Aluminum
- Cylinder head material: Aluminum
- Valvetrain: DOHC 4 valves x cyl. with VTEC (some non-VTEC versions)
- Compression ratio: 9.8:1–11.0:1

RPM range
- Max. engine speed: 6500–7400

Combustion
- Fuel system: PGM-FI
- Fuel type: Gasoline
- Cooling system: Water-cooled

Output
- Power output: 160–220 PS (118–162 kW; 158–217 hp)
- Torque output: 152–164 lb⋅ft (206–222 N⋅m)

The Honda H engine was Honda's larger high-performance engine family from the 1990s and early 2000s. It is largely derived from the Honda F engine with which it shares many design features. Like Honda's other 4-cylinder families of the 1980s and 1990s, It has also enjoyed some success as a racing engine, forming the basis of Honda's touring car racing engines for many years, and being installed in lightweight chassis (such as the Honda CR-X) for use in drag racing. The F20B is a part of the F-series family of engines; it is basically a cast-iron sleeved down destroked version of the H22A. It was developed by Honda to be able to enter into the 2-liter class of international racing.

H-Series consisted of two different displacements; H22 2.2 L (2,157 cc) and H23 2.3 L (2,259 cc). Both versions were using the same block; different crankshafts and connecting rods were utilized to achieve displacement variation.

== H22 ==
The H22 debuted in the U.S. in 1993 as the H22A1 for use in the Honda Prelude VTEC. Since then, versions of the H22 would become the Prelude's signature high-performance engine worldwide until the end of Prelude production in 2001. In 1994, Honda of Europe used the H22A cylinder head and the H22A engine block as the Formula 3 engine which was an H22A engine destroked from 2.2 liters to 2.0 liters (F3-2000cc) to compete in the European F3 series. It was then used by Mugen Motorsports as the F20B(MF204B) from 1997-2001. In 1995-1997, Honda of Europe used the same H22A-based F3 engine in the British Touring Car Championship (BTCC) Honda Accord. Also, in 1996-1997 Honda of Japan used the same H22A-based F3 engine in the Japan Touring Car Championship (JTCC) Honda Accord and won the JTCC for both years. Honda of Europe hired Neil Brown Engineering of England to convert the H22A engine into an F3 engine which would be later used in BTCC and JTCC. The type S Prelude has an engine rev cut of 9100rpm.

Engine Specifications

- Bore × Stroke: 87 mm × 90.7 mm (3.43 in × 3.57 in)
- Displacement: 2.2 L; 131.6 cu in (2,157 cc)
- Valve Configuration: DOHC, 16 valves, VTEC
- Type: In-line 4 cylinder, aluminum block and head
- Compression ratio: 10.0-10.6:1 (North America); 10.0-11.0:1 (Europe); 10.6-11.0:1 (Japan)
- Max power: 185–220 hp (138–164 kW; 188–223 PS)
- VTEC Engagement: 5200 rpm
- Rev Cut: 8700 - 9100 rpm
- Engine Control System: Honda Systems PGM-FI with port fuel injection
- Valve Gear: Belt-driven dual overhead cams, 4 valves per cylinder, variable timing and lift
- 92-96 versions use closed-deck blocks, while the 97-01 versions used open-deck blocks
- All H22 variants use FRM cylinder liners

=== H22A DOHC VTEC ===
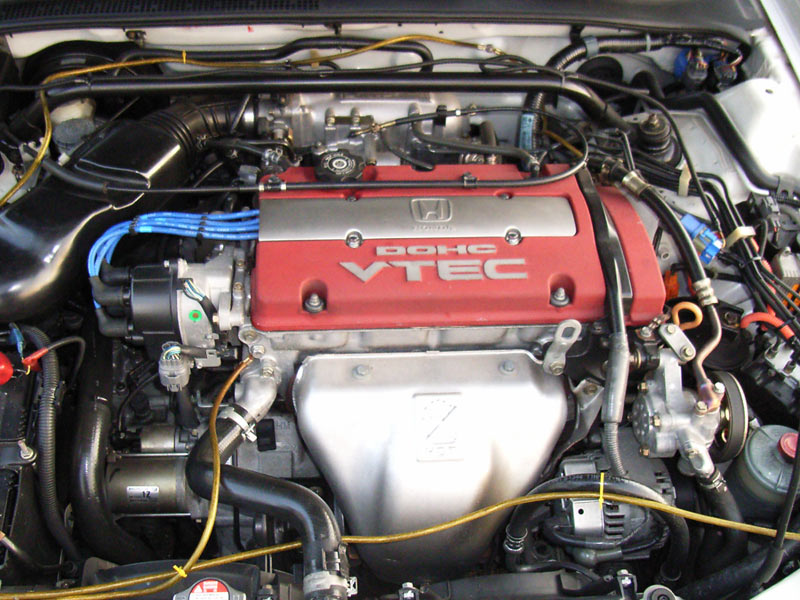
H22A VTEC engine

- Engine Block Serial Codes (~ = serial productions numbers i.e. 1, 2, 3, etc.)
  - Found in 1992-1996 Honda Prelude BB4-BB6
    - H22A-1000001~ Si Vtec; Si Vtec-4WS
    - H22A-1040001~ Si Vtec; Si Vtec-4WS
    - H22A-1100001~ Si Vtec; Si Vtec-S Limited; Si Vtec-4WS
    - H22A-1150001~ Si Vtec; Si Vtec-Sport Package; Si Vtec-4WS
    - H22A-1200001~ Si Vtec; Si Vtec-Sport Package R-2 (M/T); Si Vtec-Sport Package G-2 (A/T); Si Vtec-4WS
  - Found in 1994-1997 Honda Accord SiR Sedan CD-6
    - H22A-2000001~
    - H22A-2020001~
    - H22A-2050001~
    - H22A-2070001~
  - Found in 1997 Honda Accord SiR Wagon CF-2
    - H22A-3030001~
  - Found in 1997-2001 Honda Prelude BB6-BB8
    - H22A-1250001~ SiR; SiR-4WS
    - H22A-4000001~ Type S
    - H22A-1270001~ SiR; SiR-4WS
    - H22A-4010001~ Type S
    - H22A-1280001~ SiR; SiR S spec; SiR-4WS
    - H22A-4020001~ Type S
    - H22A-1290001~ SiR; SiR S spec; SiR-4WS
    - H22A-4030001~ Type S
  - Found in 1999-2001 Honda Accord/Torneo Euro-R CL1
    - H22A-4000001~
    - H22A-4100001~

=== H22A ===
- Found in the Japanese 4th gen 1992-1996 Prelude Si VTEC (2WS BB4 & 4WS BB1). It produces 200 PS (147 kW; 197 hp) @ 6,800 rpm & 161.5 ft⋅lbf (219 N⋅m) @ 5,500 rpm and comes with a black valve cover.
- Found in the Japanese 5th gen 1997-2001 Prelude SiR (2WS BB6 & 4WS BB8). It produces 200 PS (147 kW; 197 hp) @ 6,800 rpm & 161.5 ft⋅lbf (219 N⋅m) @ 5,500 rpm and comes with a black valve cover.
- Found in the Japanese 5th gen 1997-2001 Prelude Type-S and SiR S-Spec (BB6). It produces 220 PS (162 kW; 217 hp) @ 7,200 rpm & 163 ft⋅lbf (221 N⋅m) @ 6,500 rpm and comes with a red valvecover, more aggressive camshafts & mild porting on intake ports for more top end power.
- Found in the Japanese 5th gen 1994-1996 Accord SiR Sedan (CD6). It produces 190 PS (140 kW; 187 hp) @ 6,800 rpm & 152 ft⋅lbf (206 N⋅m) @ 5,500 rpm and comes with a black valvecover.
- Found in the Japanese 5th gen 1997 Accord SiR Wagon (CF2). It produces 190 PS (140 kW; 187 hp) @ 6,800 rpm & 152 ft⋅lbf (206 N⋅m) @ 5,500 rpm and comes with a black valvecover.
- Found in the Japanese 6th gen 1999-2001 Accord/Torneo Euro-R (CL1). It produces 220 PS (162 kW; 217 hp) @ 7,200 rpm & 163 ft⋅lbf (221 N⋅m) @ 6,500 rpm and comes with a red valve cover.

The JDM H22 was and still is quite popular amongst Honda enthusiasts till current day.

=== H22A1 ===
- Found in the American 4th gen Prelude VTEC (BB1).
- Found in the Canadian 4th gen Prelude SR-V (BB1).
- Found in the Australian 4th gen Prelude VTi-R (BB1).
  - It produces 190 PS (140 kW; 187 hp) @ 6,800 rpm
  - 153 ft⋅lbf (207 N⋅m) @ 5,500 rpm
  - comes with a black valvecover.

=== H22A2 ===
- Found in the European 4th gen Prelude 2.2i VTEC (BB1).
- It produces 185 PS (136 kW; 182 hp)
- comes with a black valvecover.

=== H22A3 ===
- Found in the 1996 VTEC model (BB1) in various countries around the world denoted with regional code KU. It comes with a black valve cover.
- Found in the 1994 Honda Accord Coupe SiR with the CD8 chassis in countries like New Zealand. Built in the USA yet sold only overseas. Reputedly 182 hp (185 PS; 136 kW) peak output.

=== H22A4 ===
- Found in the American 5th gen Prelude Base and Type-SH (BB6).
- Found in the Canadian 5th gen Prelude Base, Type-SH, and SE (BB6).
- Found in the Australian 1997-1998 Prelude VTi-R and VTi-R ATTS (BB6).
  - It produces 200 PS (147 kW; 197 hp) @ 7,000 rpm
  - & 156 ft⋅lbf (212 N⋅m) @ 5,250 rpm
  - and comes with a black valvecover

=== H22A5 ===
- Found in the European 1997-1998 Prelude 2.2VTi/VTi-S (2WS BB6 & 4WS BB8).
  - It produces 185 PS (136 kW; 182 hp)
  - comes with a black valvecover.

=== H22A7 ===
- Found in the European 1998-2002 Accord Type-R (CH1).
  - It produces 212 PS (156 kW; 209 hp) @ 7,200 rpm
  - 164 lb⋅ft (222 N⋅m) @ 6,700 rpm
  - comes with red valve cover.

=== H22A8 ===
- Found in the European 1999-2001 Prelude 2.2VTi/VTi-S (2WS BB6 & 4WS BB8).
  - It produces 200 PS (147 kW; 197 hp) @ 7,100 rpm
  - 156 ft⋅lbf (212 N⋅m) @ 5,250 rpm
  - comes with a red valvecover.

=== H22Z1 ===
- Found in the Australian 1999-2001 VTi-R and VTi-R ATTS (BB6). It is thought to be identical to the H22A4, however, there is speculation that power was increased from 197 hp (147 kW) to 208 hp (155 kW). It comes with a Black valve cover on the normal VTi-R but on the VTi-R ATTS it comes with a Red valve cover, according to the Prelude owner manual the H22Z1 (Misspelled as H22Z2) has a compression ratio of 11.0:1 which is the same as the H22A found in the JDM Prelude type s.

== H23 ==
The H23 was an increased-stroke, non-VTEC version of the H22, used in Japan, North America, and Europe. It shared the same Fiber Reinforced Metal (FRM) cylinder wall liners with the H22.

Specifications

- Bore × Stroke: 87 mm × 95 mm (3.43 in × 3.74 in)
- Displacement: 2.3 L; 137.9 cu in (2,259 cc)
- Valve Configuration: DOHC, 16 valves
- Type: In-line 4 cylinder, aluminum block and head
- Compression ratio: 9.8:1
- Max power: 160 hp (119 kW)
- Max torque: 156 lb⋅ft (212 N⋅m)
- Redline: 6500rpm
- Engine Control System: Honda Systems PGM-FI with port fuel injection
- Valve Gear: belt-driven dual overhead cams, 4 valves per cylinder

=== H23A1 ===
- Found in the American 4th gen Prelude Si (BB2). It produces 162 PS (119 kW; 160 hp) & 156 lb⋅ft (212 N⋅m) and comes with a "black top".
- Found in the American 1995 Prelude SE (BB2). It produces 162 PS (119 kW; 160 hp) & 156 lb⋅ft (212 N⋅m) and comes with a "black top".
- Found in the Canadian 4th gen Prelude SR (BB2). It produces 162 PS (119 kW; 160 hp) & 156 lb⋅ft (212 N⋅m) and comes with a "black top".
- Found in the Australian 4th gen Prelude Si (BB2). It produces 162 PS (119 kW; 160 hp) & 156 lb⋅ft (212 N⋅m) and comes with a "black top".
- Found in the Australian 1991-1993 Prelude SRS (BB2). It produces 162 PS (119 kW; 160 hp) & 156 lb⋅ft (212 N⋅m) and comes with a "black top".

=== H23A2 ===
- Found in the European 4th gen Prelude 2.3i (BB2). It produces 162 PS (119 kW; 160 hp) & 154 lb⋅ft (209 N⋅m) and comes with a "black top".

=== H23A3 ===
- Found in the European 1993-1995 Accord 2.3i SR (CC7). It produces 162 PS (119 kW; 160 hp) & 154 lb⋅ft (209 N⋅m) and comes with a "black top".
- Found in the European 1993-1999 Rover 623 SLi, GSi, and iS. It produces 162 PS (119 kW; 160 hp) & 154 lb⋅ft (209 N⋅m) and comes with a "black top".

=== H23A DOHC VTEC ===
In 1998, Honda of Japan produced a rare DOHC VTEC version of the H23A engine for use in Japan only. It has been factory modified with an internal oil passage in the H23A block to operate the VTEC solenoid in the H22A head. It has the same horsepower rating as the H22A engine but a lower redline of 7200rpms because it has a longer stroke than the H22A. The H23A DOHC VTEC has 87 mm × 95 mm (3.43 in × 3.74 in) (bore and stroke) and the H22A DOHC VTEC has 87 mm × 90.7 mm (3.43 in × 3.57 in) (bore and stroke). It also lacked the oil squirters found on the H22A and H22Z VTEC engines, but there are provisions for the oil squirters to be installed, as the main oil galley feeding the squirters has been tapped, the holes for the bolts that hold the squirters at the bottom of each bore have been tapped. Installation of the squirters is possible but the actual squirters need to be bent to clear the larger stroke crank of the H23A VTEC engine. The H23A DOHC VTEC Engine is largest displacement in the H Series engines with a compression ratio of 10.6:1.

- Found in the Japanese 1998-2002 Accord Wagon SiR (CH9). It produces 200 PS (147 kW; 197 hp) @ 6,800 rpm & 163 lb⋅ft (221 N⋅m) @ 5,300 rpm and comes with a "blue top".
- Found in the Japanese 1998-2002 Accord Wagon AWD (CL2). It produces 190 PS (140 kW; 187 hp) @ 6,800 rpm & 163 lb⋅ft (221 N⋅m) @ 5,300 rpm and comes with a "blue top".

== H-series Motor Specifications ==
H Series Motor Specifications Chart 1 (Updated 15/10/2023 JM)
Chassis	Engine Code	Deck Type	Power	Compression Ratio	Bore x Stroke
Accord CD6 SiR	H22A	Closed	190 PS (140 kW; 187 hp)	10.6:1	87 mm × 90.7 mm (3.43 in × 3.57 in)
Accord CF2 SiR	H22A	Closed	190 PS (140 kW; 187 hp)	10.6:1	87 mm × 90.7 mm (3.43 in × 3.57 in)
Prelude BB1/BB4 SiR VTEC	H22A	Closed	200 PS (147 kW; 197 hp)	10.6:1	87 mm × 90.7 mm (3.43 in × 3.57 in)
Prelude BB6/BB8 SiR	H22A	Open	200 PS (147 kW; 197 hp)	10.6:1	87 mm × 90.7 mm (3.43 in × 3.57 in)
Prelude BB6 S-Spec	H22A	Open	220 PS (162 kW; 217 hp)	11.0:1	87 mm × 90.7 mm (3.43 in × 3.57 in)
Prelude BB6 Type S	H22A	Open	220 PS (162 kW; 217 hp)	11.0:1	87 mm × 90.7 mm (3.43 in × 3.57 in)
Accord CL1 Euro R	H22A	Open	220 PS (162 kW; 217 hp)	11.0:1	87 mm × 90.7 mm (3.43 in × 3.57 in)
Prelude BB1 VTi-R	H22A1	Closed	190 PS (140 kW; 187 hp)	10.0:1	87 mm × 90.7 mm (3.43 in × 3.57 in)
Prelude BB1 SR-V	H22A1	Closed	190 PS (140 kW; 187 hp)	10.0:1	87 mm × 90.7 mm (3.43 in × 3.57 in)
Prelude BB1 VTEC	H22A1	Closed	190 PS (140 kW; 187 hp)	10.0:1	87 mm × 90.7 mm (3.43 in × 3.57 in)
Prelude BB1 2.2i VTEC	H22A2	Closed	185 PS (136 kW; 182 hp)	10.0:1	87 mm × 90.7 mm (3.43 in × 3.57 in)
Prelude BB1	H22A3	Closed	190 PS (140 kW; 187 hp)	10.0:1	87 mm × 90.7 mm (3.43 in × 3.57 in)
Accord CD8 SiR	H22A3	Closed	190 PS (140 kW; 187 hp)	10.6:1	87 mm × 90.7 mm (3.43 in × 3.57 in)
Prelude BB6 SE	H22A4	Open	198 PS (145 kW; 195 hp)	10.0:1	87 mm × 90.7 mm (3.43 in × 3.57 in)
Prelude BB6 Base	H22A4	Open	203 PS (149 kW; 200 hp)	10.0:1	87 mm × 90.7 mm (3.43 in × 3.57 in)
Prelude BB6 VTi-R	H22A4	Open	203 PS (149 kW; 200 hp)	10.0:1	87 mm × 90.7 mm (3.43 in × 3.57 in)
Prelude BB6 ATTS	H22A4	Open	203 PS (149 kW; 200 hp)	10.0:1	87 mm × 90.7 mm (3.43 in × 3.57 in)
Prelude BB6 Type SH	H22A4	Open	203 PS (149 kW; 200 hp)	10.0:1	87 mm × 90.7 mm (3.43 in × 3.57 in)
Prelude BB6/BB8 2.2 VTi	H22A5	Open	185 PS (136 kW; 182 hp)	10.0:1	87 mm × 90.7 mm (3.43 in × 3.57 in)
Prelude BB6 2.2 VTi-S	H22A5	Open	185 PS (136 kW; 182 hp)	10.0:1	87 mm × 90.7 mm (3.43 in × 3.57 in)
Accord CH1 Type R	H22A7	Open	212 PS (156 kW; 209 hp)	11.0:1	87 mm × 90.7 mm (3.43 in × 3.57 in)
Prelude BB6/BB8 2.2 VTi	H22A8	Open	200 PS (147 kW; 197 hp)	11.0:1	87 mm × 90.7 mm (3.43 in × 3.57 in)
Prelude BB6 2.2 VTi-S	H22A8	Open	200 PS (147 kW; 197 hp)	11.0:1	87 mm × 90.7 mm (3.43 in × 3.57 in)
Prelude BB6 VTi-R	H22Z1	Open	212 PS (156 kW; 209 hp)	10.0:1	87 mm × 90.7 mm (3.43 in × 3.57 in)
Prelude BB6 ATTS	H22Z1	Open	212 PS (156 kW; 209 hp)	10.0:1	87 mm × 90.7 mm (3.43 in × 3.57 in)
Prelude BB1 S	H23A	Closed	160 PS (118 kW; 158 hp)	9.8:1	87 mm × 95 mm (3.43 in × 3.74 in)
Accord CH9 SiR (VTEC)	H23A	Open	200 PS (147 kW; 197 hp)	9.8:1	87 mm × 95 mm (3.43 in × 3.74 in)
Prelude BB1 Si	H23A1	Closed	160 PS (118 kW; 158 hp)	9.8:1	87 mm × 95 mm (3.43 in × 3.74 in)
Prelude BB2 SE	H23A1	Closed	160 PS (118 kW; 158 hp)	9.8:1	87 mm × 95 mm (3.43 in × 3.74 in)
Prelude BB2 SR	H23A1	Closed	160 PS (118 kW; 158 hp)	9.8:1	87 mm × 95 mm (3.43 in × 3.74 in)
Prelude BB2 SRS	H23A1	Closed	160 PS (118 kW; 158 hp)	9.8:1	87 mm × 95 mm (3.43 in × 3.74 in)
Prelude BB2 2.3i	H23A2	Closed	160 PS (118 kW; 158 hp)	9.8:1	87 mm × 95 mm (3.43 in × 3.74 in)
Accord CC7 2.3i SR	H23A3	Closed	160 PS (118 kW; 158 hp)	9.8:1	87 mm × 95 mm (3.43 in × 3.74 in)

Engine	Rod Length	Rod Width	Main Bore	Pin Bore	Piston Volume	Wrist Pin Diam.	Main Bearing Width	Rod Bearing Width
H22A	143 mm (5.6 in)	23.75 mm (0.935 in)	51 mm (2.0 in)	21.97–21.98 mm (0.865–0.865 in)	−1.9 cc (−0.12 cu in)	22 mm (0.87 in)	19.9 mm (0.78 in)	19.35 mm (0.762 in)
H22A1	143 mm (5.6 in)	23.75 mm (0.935 in)	51 mm (2.0 in)	21.97–21.98 mm (0.865–0.865 in)	−1.8 cc (−0.11 cu in)	22 mm (0.87 in)	19.9 mm (0.78 in)	19.35 mm (0.762 in)
H22A2								
H22A3								
H22A4	143 mm (5.6 in)	23.75 mm (0.935 in)	51 mm (2.0 in)	21.97–21.98 mm (0.865–0.865 in)	−1.8 cc (−0.11 cu in)	22 mm (0.87 in)	19.9 mm (0.78 in)	19.35 mm (0.762 in)
H22A5								
H22A7								
H22A8								
H22Z1								
H23A	141.5 mm (5.57 in)	23.75 mm (0.935 in)	51 mm (2.0 in)	21.97–21.98 mm (0.865–0.865 in)	+4.3 cc (0.26 cu in)	22 mm (0.87 in)	19.9 mm (0.78 in)	19.35 mm (0.762 in)
H23A1	141.5 mm (5.57 in)	23.75 mm (0.935 in)	51 mm (2.0 in)	21.97–21.98 mm (0.865–0.865 in)	−9.9 cc (−0.60 cu in)	22 mm (0.87 in)	19.9 mm (0.78 in)	19.35 mm (0.762 in)
H23A2								
H23A3								
H23A VTEC	141 mm (5.6 in)							

Engine	Intake Valve Diam.	Exhaust Valve Diam.	Main Journal Diam.	Rod Journal Diam.
H22A	35 mm (1.4 in)	30 mm (1.2 in)	50 mm (2.0 in)	47.95 mm (1.888 in)
H22A1	35 mm (1.4 in)	30 mm (1.2 in)	50 mm (2.0 in)	47.95 mm (1.888 in)
H22A2				
H22A3
H22A4	35 mm (1.4 in)	30 mm (1.2 in)	55 mm (2.2 in) (1997 only = 50 mm (2.0 in))	47.95 mm (1.888 in)
H22A5				
H22A7
H22A8
H22Z1
H23A	35 mm (1.4 in)	30 mm (1.2 in)	55 mm (2.2 in)	47.95 mm (1.888 in)
H23A1	34 mm (1.3 in)	29 mm (1.1 in)	50 mm (2.0 in)	47.95 mm (1.888 in)
H23A2				
H23A3
H23A VTEC			55 mm (2.2 in)	

== See also ==
- List of Honda engines
