= FX2 (disambiguation) =

F/X2 is a 1991 American action thriller film.

FX2 may also refer to:

- Paramotor Inc FX series, a powered paraglider
- Yashica FX-2, a Japanese 35mm SLR camera
- Austin FX2 London Black Cab, a prototype version of the Austin FX3
- FX+2, a time-shifted version of Australian TV channel FX
- "FX 2.0", a 2002 instrumental by Jake Kaufman
- FX2-Division, another name for TriMet's Frequent Express bus service in Portland Oregon

== See also ==
- Casio FX 1.0/2.0 series graphic calculators
- FX (disambiguation)
- FXX (disambiguation)
- JavaFX, which has a version 2.0
- Pinball FX 2, a 2010 Xbox videogame
