= Form 20-F =

U.S. SEC filing used by foreign private issuers

Form 20-F is an SEC filing submitted to the US Securities and Exchange Commission used by certain foreign private issuers to provide information. The form is used by companies where 50% or less of the total amount of voting shares are held by American Citizens, but its shares can be traded on an American Exchange. The purpose of the form is to standardize the reports of foreign businesses for the American Markets.

20-F, 20-F/A Annual and transition report of foreign private issuers pursuant to sections 13 or 15(d)

20FR12B, 20FR12B/A Form for initial registration of a class of securities of foreign private issuers pursuant to section 12(b)

20FR12G, 20FR12G/A Form for initial registration of a class of securities of foreign private issuers pursuant to section 12(g)

The postfix /A stands for 'Amendment' The report must be filed within four months after the end of the fiscal year.

A 40-F is used for Canadian filers.

It is similar to the Form 10-K used by domestic companies.
