= Programmed fuel injection =

Electronic multi-point injection system

Programmed Fuel Injection, or PGMFI/PGM-FI, is the name given by Honda to a proprietary digital electronic multi-point injection system for internal combustion engines. It has been available since the early 1980s. This system has been used in motorcycles, automobiles, and outboard motors.

== History ==
With its origins beginning with the CX500 and CX650 turbocharged motorcycles in 1982 and 1983, respectively, Honda's PGM-FI made its way into their automobiles in the early 1980s with the ER engine equipped City Turbo. The system gained popularity in the late 1980s in their Accord and Prelude models with A20A, A20A3 & A20A4 engines (Honda A engine), and its motorcycles later on. In 1998, Honda built its third motorcycle with multi-point injection; the VFR800FI.

== Operation ==
The PGM-FI system relies on a piezoelectric sensor to measure intake manifold air pressure, then combines that data with the crankshaft rpm and other info to compute the air quantity, and interprets the data using performance maps. Fuel is injected intermittently into the inlet ports. The PGM-FI also has a trailing throttle fuel cutoff and a self-diagnosis system.
