= FXX (disambiguation) =

FXX is an American television channel owned and operated by The Walt Disney Company.

FXX may also refer to:

- FXX (Canadian TV channel)
- Ferrari FXX, 2005 Ferrari track car
- Ferrari FXX-K, 2015 Ferrari track car
- Felix Airways (ICAO airline designator)
- Fokker F.XX, a Dutch airliner
- F/A-XX program (a.k.a. F-XX), a 21st-century U.S. Navy project to replace the F/A-18E/F

== See also ==
- FX (disambiguation)
- FX2 (disambiguation)
- F20 (disambiguation)
