= Honda Vigor =

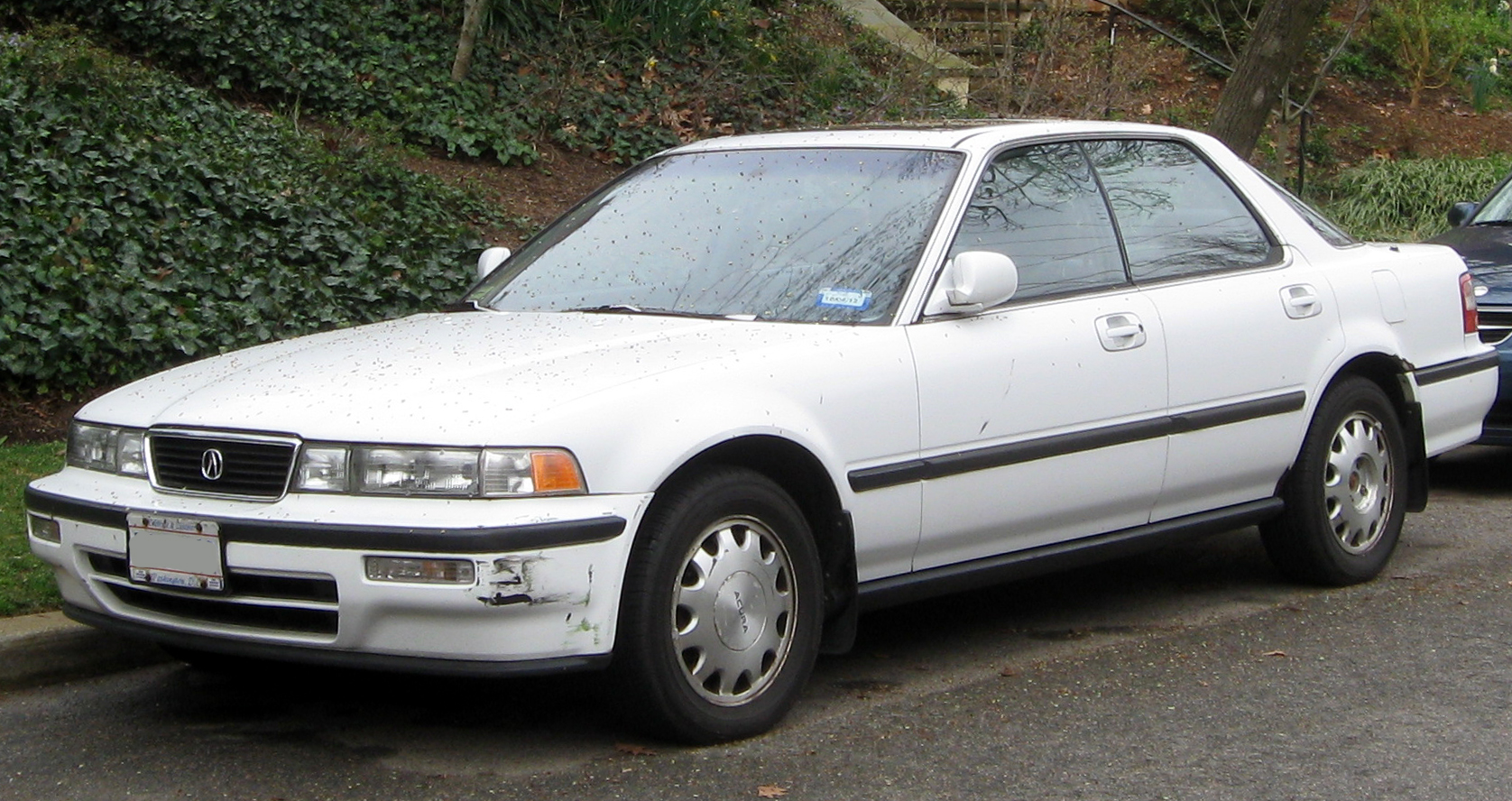
- Acura Vigor

Overview
- Manufacturer: Honda
- Production: 1981–1995
- Assembly: Japan: Sayama, Saitama

Body and chassis
- Class: Compact car (1981–1995); Mid-size (1989–1995)
- Related: Honda Accord; Honda Inspire

Chronology
- Successor: Acura TL (Hong Kong, United States and Canada)

The Honda Vigor (Japanese: ホンダ・ビガー, Honda Bigā) is a premium sedan that was derived from the Honda Accord. It was sold in Japan through the Honda Verno dealer network from 1981 until 1995, and sold in North America from June 1991 (model year 1992) until 1994 as the Acura Vigor. Early Vigors were more upmarket versions of the Accord, and served as Honda's flagship until the arrival of the Honda Legend. In 1989, the Vigor would differentiate itself further from the Accord with unique styling and an available longitudinal five-cylinder engine, and a twin to the Vigor was introduced with the Honda Inspire, available at Honda Clio dealerships.

It was replaced in North America with the Acura TL and in Japan with the Honda Saber/Inspire, which were the same vehicle sold through different networks.

The third generation, five-cylinder Vigor was developed during what was known in Japan as the Japanese asset price bubble or "bubble economy".

== First generation (SZ/AD) ==
Honda Vigor
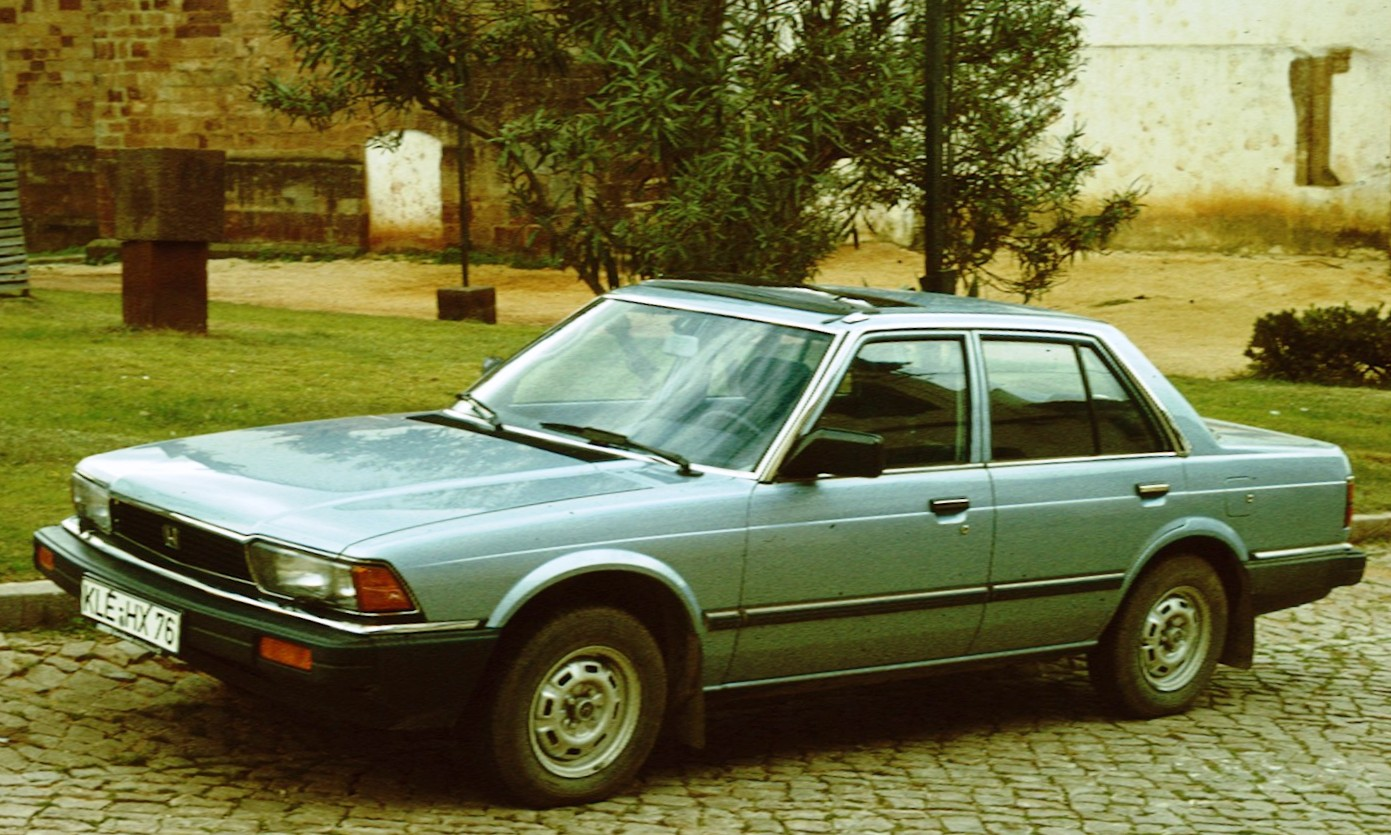

Overview
- Also called: Honda Accord (2nd gen)
- Production: 1981–1985

Body and chassis
- Class: Compact
- Body style: 3-door hatchback (SZ); 4-door sedan (AD)

Powertrain
- Engine: 1.8 L EK1 CVCC-II carb I4; 1.8 L ES3 PGM-FI I4
- Transmission: 4-speed Hondamatic automatic 5-speed manual

Dimensions
- Wheelbase: 2,450 mm (96.5 in) sedan
- Length: 4,410 mm (173.6 in) sedan
- Width: 1,650 mm (65.0 in) sedan
- Height: 1,375 mm (54.1 in) sedan

Beginning September 25, 1981, Honda produced a variant of the Honda Accord badged as the Honda Vigor for Japan only. The first generation Vigor was a higher grade 4-door sedan and 3-door hatchback, with the 1.8 L engine as the only engine available, using Honda's CVCC-II system. The Vigor was a sportier, faster, "vigorous" Accord with a higher level of equipment over the more sedate Accord. Due to the higher level of luxury-oriented equipment, the Vigor helped "set the stage" for the market to accept a luxury-equipped car from Honda, which appeared in 1985 with the Honda Legend. The Vigor competed with the Toyota Cresta and the Nissan Laurel in Japan. The rear lighting implementation consisted of the license plate installed in the bumper, with a black trim piece between the rear tail lights and the word "Vigor" inscribed. The Accord installed the rear license plate between the rear tail lights.

This engine used the SOHC 3-valve-per-cylinder CVCC-II setup, mated to a 5-speed manual or 4-speed automatic transmission with a lockup torque converter. Vehicles with a manual transmission and the CVCC carburetor earned 13.6 km/L (38 mpg_{‑imp}; 32 mpg_{‑US}) based on Japanese Government emissions tests using ten different modes of scenario standards, and 110 PS (81 kW; 108 bhp), and 23 km/L (65 mpg_{‑imp}; 54 mpg_{‑US}) at consistently maintained speeds at 60 km/h (37.3 mph). Vehicles with PGM-FI earned 13.2 km/L (37 mpg_{‑imp}; 31 mpg_{‑US}) based on Japanese Government emissions tests using 10 different modes of scenario standards, with 130 PS (96 kW; 128 bhp), and 22 km/L (62 mpg_{‑imp}; 52 mpg_{‑US}) consistently maintained speeds at 60 km/h (37.3 mph). Japanese buyers were liable for a higher annual road tax over other Honda products with smaller engines.

Items that were optional on the Accord, such as cruise control, air conditioning with automatic fan speed control and thermostatically monitored temperature, power windows with driver's one-touch express down, and power steering, were standard on the Vigor. A trip computer that displayed mileage, driving time, and fuel economy, which Honda called in sales brochure literature "Electronic Navigator," was also standard on the Vigor. All Vigors were also equipped with ELR (Emergency Locking Retractor) seatbelts. One of the optional items on the Vigor was an Electro Gyrocator, the world's first automatic in-car navigation system. Other items included digital instrumentation, four-wheel Anti-lock brakes, a choice of stereo systems from Alpine Electronics, Clarion, and Pioneer, alloy wheels (13-inch), and adjustable thigh support on the front passenger seat.

As of 1985, the trim levels offered were the MG, ME, and ME-R for the sedan. Earlier trim packages were the VXR, VX, and VL, all using the CVCC-II induction setup. Honda's fuel injection system was offered on the VTL-i and VT-i. The Vigor hatchback was available with the trim packages MX-T and the ME-T until it was replaced by the Honda Integra 2-door hatchback in 1984. Earlier trim packages for the Vigor hatchback were the TXL, TX, and TU using the carburetor and the TT-i with fuel injection. Vehicles that were fitted with fuel injection no longer used the CVCC system. Some of the standard equipment on the MX-T hatchback and the MG and ME sedans included cruise control, two-position all-wheel auto-leveling suspension, fuel usage computer, AM/FM cassette stereo and two coaxial loudspeakers, flow-through ventilation, velour interior with split folding rear seats, and a rear cargo cover for the hatchbacks. The higher trim level ME-T hatchback and the ME-R included delayed interior illumination ("theater lighting"), four coaxial speakers with the stereo system, power windows and locks, disc brakes front and rear, and speed-sensitive power steering.

The vehicle was the same, but there were some differences in the equipment available between the Accord and the Vigor. Producing a vehicle with two different names allowed Honda to sell the car at different sales channels in Japan; the Vigor was sold at Honda Verno dealerships, and the Accord was sold at Honda Clio dealerships. The fully equipped Vigor three-door hatchback offered cargo-carrying flexibility over the first generation Nissan Leopard coupé, which was not a hatchback, an approach shared with the first and second generation Toyota Supra.

In 1997, Honda reused this approach to add an enhanced version of the mainstay Accord, making a more prestigious model and naming the new car the Honda Torneo.

== Second generation (CA1-CA2-CA3) ==
Honda Vigor
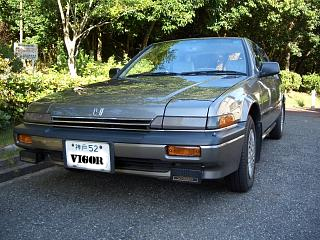

Overview
- Also called: Honda Accord (3rd gen)
- Production: 1985–1989

Body and chassis
- Class: Compact
- Body style: 4-door sedan

Powertrain
- Engine: 1829 cc A18A I4; 1834 cc B18A I4; 1958 cc B20A I4
- Transmission: 4-speed automatic 5-speed manual

Dimensions
- Wheelbase: 2,600 mm (102.4 in)
- Length: 4,535 mm (178.5 in)
- Width: 1,695 mm (66.7 in)
- Height: 1,355 mm (53.3 in)

The introduction of the redesigned Vigor took place on June 4, 1985 as a four-door sedan only. As before, the Vigor was a luxury Accord. The 1.8 L B18A four-cylinder engine was now offered with dual carburetors and a larger 2.0 L B20A engine was offered Honda's PGM-FI, with the 1.8 L A18A engine as the primary offering. The Vigor had minor cosmetic differences from the Accord, using a different front grille and rear tail lights and a higher specification. The adoption of concealed headlights reflected the popularity of the Honda Prelude, and the new Honda Integra as the Vigor continued to be a companion at Honda Verno dealerships. The Vigor installed the rear license plate in the rear bumper, whereas the Accord installed the license plate indented on the trunk lid. The trim level designations were 2.0 Si, MXL-S, MX, MXL, and MF. May 1987 saw the introduction of the 2.0 Si Exclusive, adding electric retractable side view mirrors as standard. An automatic shift-lock system was added in September 1988 on the "MXL Super Stage" trim level.

The second generation Vigor also benefited from Honda deciding to employ double-wishbones at both the front and rear ends—a layout that spread to other Honda products in subsequent years. While more expensive than competitors' MacPherson strut systems, this setup provided better stability and sharper handling for the vehicle. All had front sway bars, and the upper models had rear sway bars. Brakes were small 4-wheel discs with twin-piston calipers (only available on the JDM 2.0-Si model ), larger 4-wheel discs with single-piston calipers, or a front disc/rear drum system. ABS was available as an option on the 4-wheel disc brake models. Base model Vigors rode on 13-inch steel wheels with hubcaps, while more expensive models had the option of 14-inch alloy wheels. As established with the first generation car, the luxury content was also extensive compared to luxury equipment from competitors at the time. Some of the items on the top level 2.0Si included a power tinted glass moonroof, optional four-wheel anti-lock brakes, optional colored LCD digital instruments (speedometer, tachometer, fuel gauge, and engine temperature), tilt steering with speed-sensitive power steering, cruise control, power windows, power door locks, electronic AM/FM stereo radio with cassette and four speakers (high power) with subwoofer and amplifier, intermittent front wipers (variable), 4-wheel disc brakes (front: 2-piston calipers with ventilated front discs), and optional leather interior.

== Third generation (CB5/CC2 & CC3) ==
Honda Vigor (3rd generation)
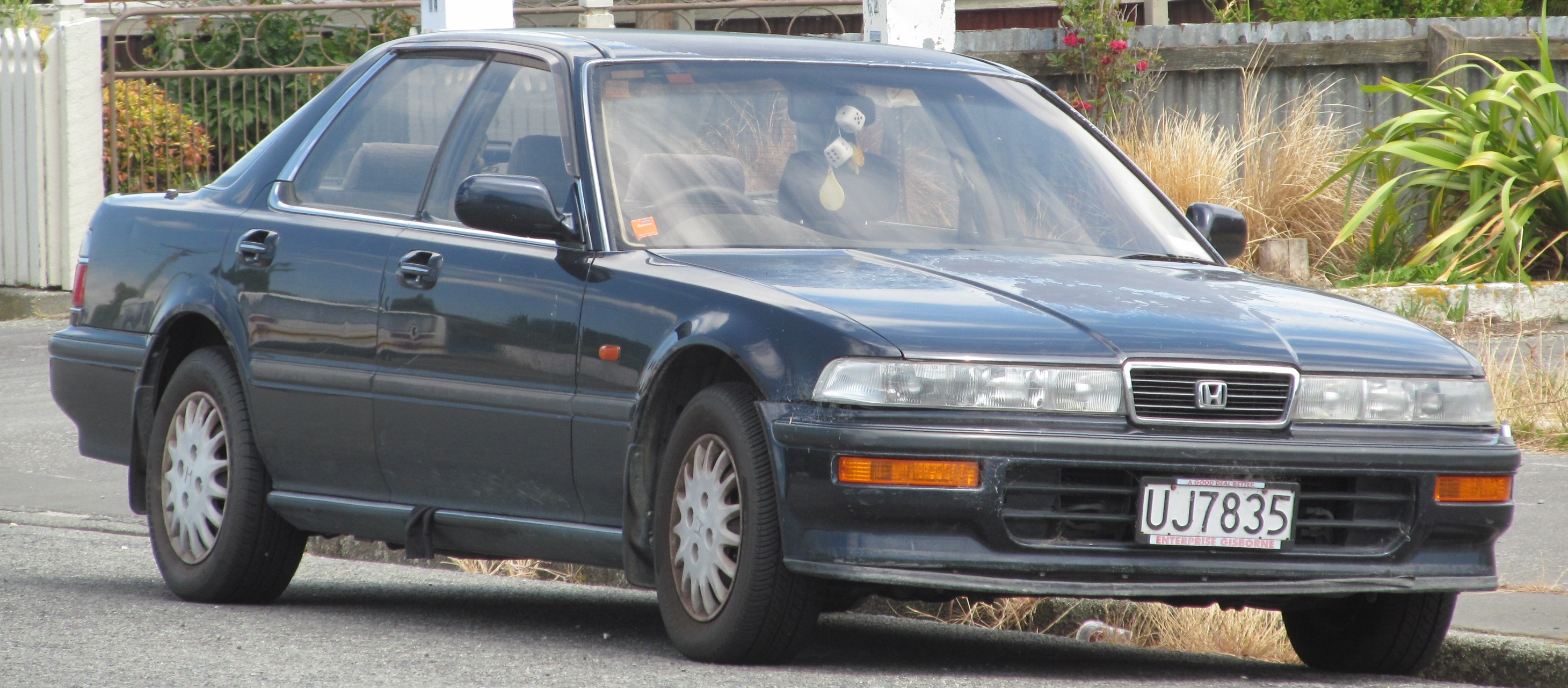

Overview
- Manufacturer: Honda
- Also called: Acura Vigor; Honda Inspire
- Production: 1989–1995 (Japan); 1991–1994 (Acura)

Body and chassis
- Class: Mid-size (Int'l); Compact (Japan)
- Body style: 4-door "B" Pillar hardtop
- Layout: Longitudinal front-engine, front-wheel drive
- Related: Honda Rafaga; Honda Inspire; Honda Ascot

Powertrain
- Engine: 2.0 L G20A1 I5; 2.5 L G25A1 I5
- Transmission: 4-speed automatic 5-speed manual

Dimensions
- Wheelbase: 2,805 mm (110.4 in)
- Length: 4,690 mm (184.6 in) (Japan); 4,836 mm (190.4 in) (Acura)
- Width: 1,695 mm (66.7 in) (Japan); 1,781 mm (70.1 in) (Acura)
- Height: 1,355 mm (53.3 in) (Japan); 1,369 mm (53.9 in) (1992 Acura); 1,321 mm (52.0 in) (1993-94 Acura)

Chronology
- Successor: Acura TL; Honda Saber

At the launch of the fourth generation Accord in 1989, the Vigor was no longer based on the Accord chassis but a stretched derivative. The third generation Vigor, fulfilling as the top-level sedan at Honda Verno dealerships in Japan, and sold along with the all-new Honda Inspire and the new second generation Honda Legend at Honda Clio dealerships. The Vigor was also sold in the United States, where it was badged as the first generation Acura Vigor beginning with the 1992 model year. In Japan, the Vigor competed against the Toyota Cresta and the Nissan Laurel. The Vigor in Japan was available in four trim packages, starting with the Type N, Type E, Type W, and Type X. In May 1991, the Type N package was no longer offered, and the top trim package was the Type S-Limited. Starting in January 1992, the trim packages were 2.5XS, 2.5S, 2.5X, 2.5W, 2.0G, and the Type W. In North America, the Vigor came in two trim packages: the LS and the higher content GS, and the 2.5 L engine was the only engine available. In Japan, the smaller G20A engine used regular-grade fuel, while the larger G25A engine used premium-grade fuel. One of the optionally available items was Digital signal processing integrated into the stereo system that allowed sound modification for various types of music.

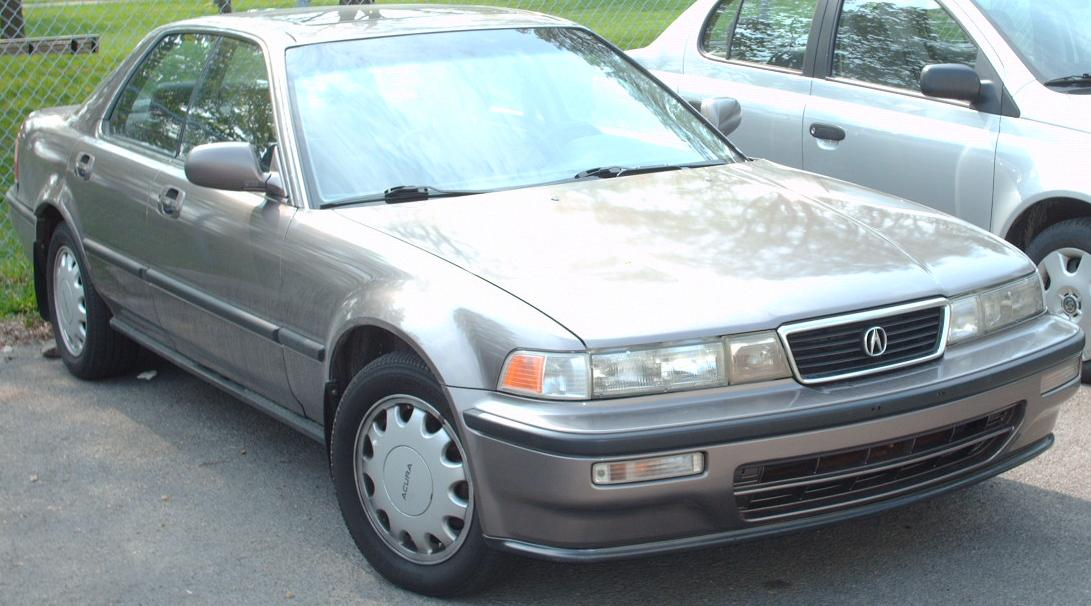
Acura Vigor (US)

Production of the Acura variant began in 1991 and the vehicle went on sale as a 1992 model in June of that year, slotting between the Integra and the Acura Legend in North America. To keep the Vigor classified as a "compact" according to Japanese vehicle size requirements, the shorter and narrower CB5 Vigor sold in Japan was available with the 2-litre G20A engine between 1989 and 1992, while only a longer and broader version (CC2 & CC3) with the G25A engine was sold in North America (as an Acura).

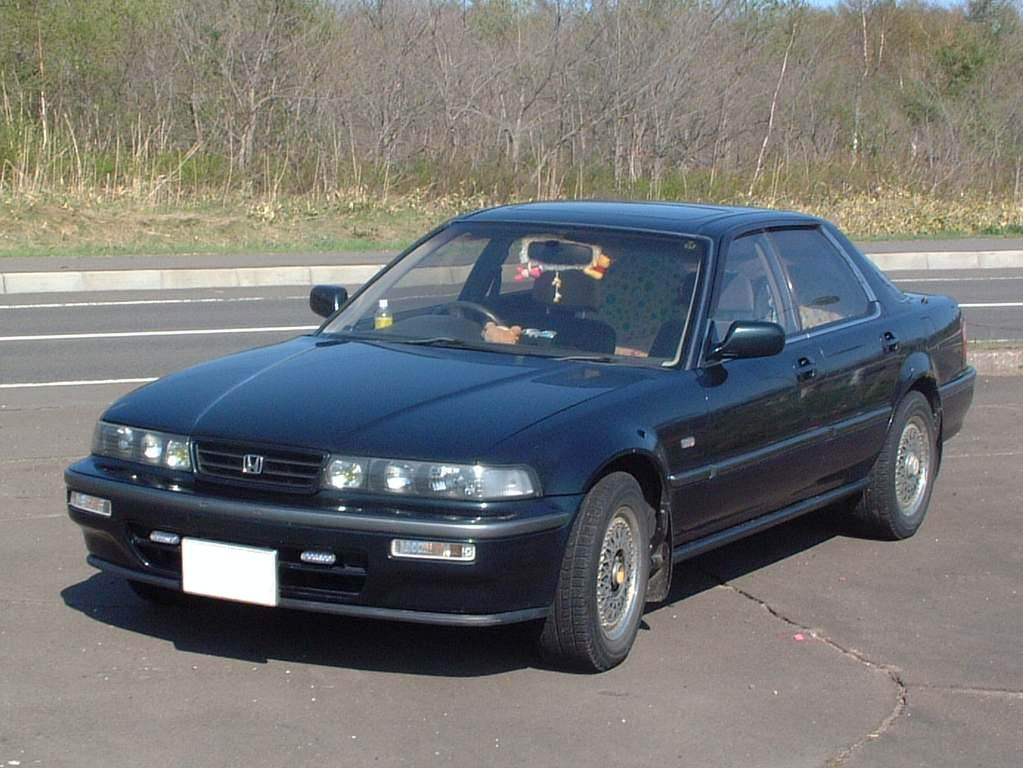
Honda Vigor (facelift)

Honda's longitudinally mounted five-cylinder petrol was the only engine available. The transmission is attached behind the engine, with a driveshaft that sends power to the front of the car to an asymmetrically installed limited-slip differential, which then supplies power to the front wheels using half shafts; this allowed the powertrain to remain slightly behind the front wheels. This also gave the car a 60:40 front-to-rear weight distribution.

Comparisons to the Lexus ES 300, which was roomier and softer in ride, generally favored the Lexus as the more appealing buy for the average luxury car buyer. In contrast, the Vigor was stiffer sprung and smaller on the inside.

In response to the reviews, Acura made several changes to the Vigor for the 1994 model year, increasing rear seat room, softening the suspension, and re-engineering the steering rack to help isolate the driver from road imperfections to make the model more like the ES. The tactics were unsuccessful; buyers favored the more powerful Legend as a sports sedan and still seemed to prefer the ES as an entry-level luxury model.

Poor sales and no improvement in market response led Honda to drop the model, and production ended on May 13, 1994. The Vigor was replaced by the 1996 Acura TL/Honda Saber.

== Sources ==
- First generation equipment declarations transcribed from Japanese language brochures for each year it was manufactured.
