= Acura TL =

Entry-level luxury car by Acura (1996–2014)

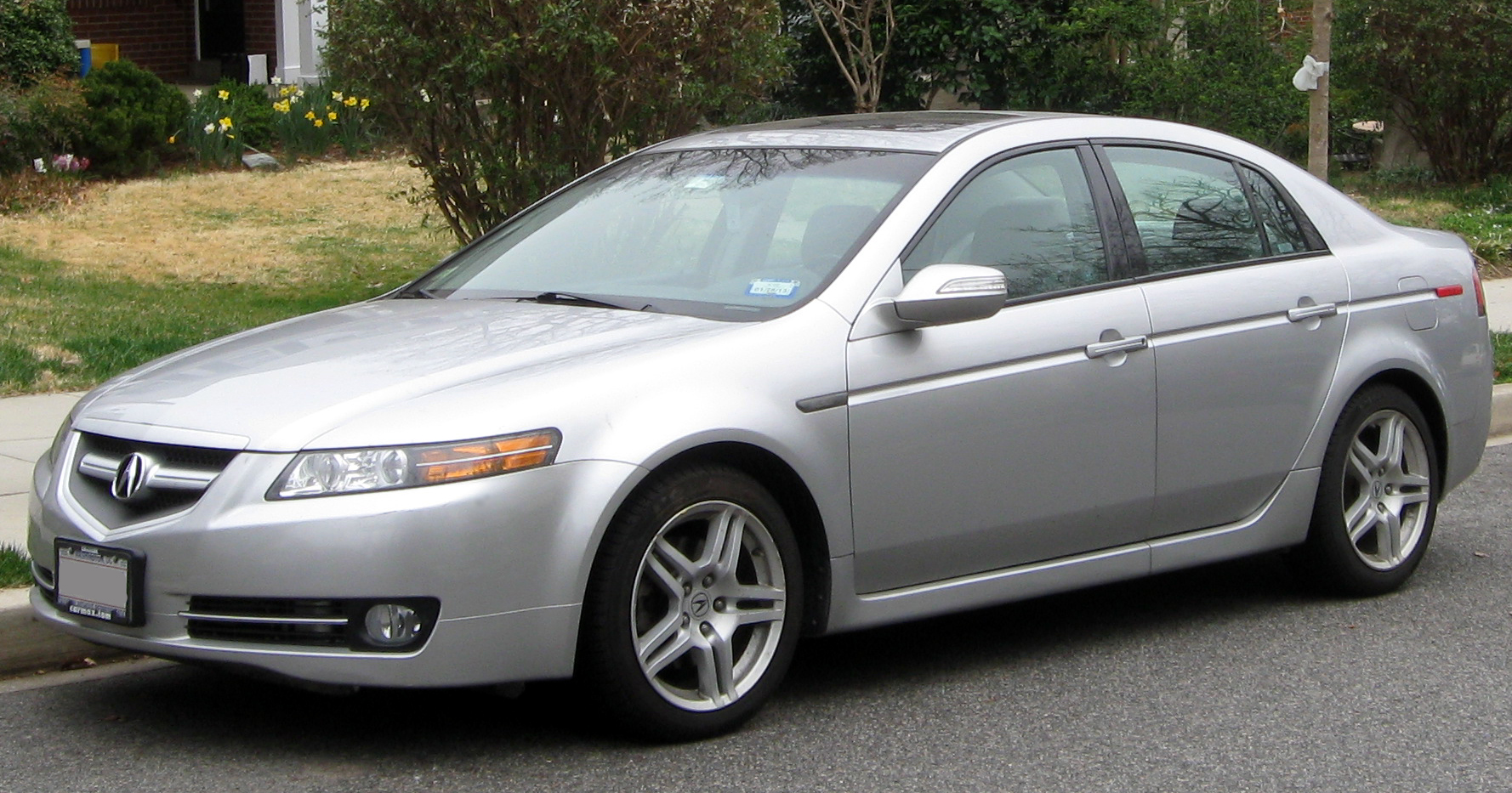
- 2007–2008 Acura TL

Overview
- Manufacturer: Honda
- Production: 1995–2014
- Model years: 1996–2014

Body and chassis
- Class: Entry-level luxury car
- Body style: 4-door sedan

Chronology
- Predecessor: Acura Vigor
- Successor: Acura TLX

The Acura TL is an entry-level luxury sedan that was manufactured by Acura, the luxury division of Honda. It was introduced in 1995 for the 1996 model year, to replace the Acura Vigor and was badged for the Japanese market from 1996 to 2000 as the Honda Inspire and from 1996 to 2004 as the Honda Saber. The TL was Acura's best-selling model until it was outsold by the MDX in 2007. In 2005, it ranked as the second best-selling luxury sedan in the United States behind the BMW 3 Series, but sales decreased after the 2008 model year. Four generations of the Acura TL were produced, with the final generation premiering in 2008 for the 2009 model year, and ending production in 2014, when it was replaced together with the TSX by the TLX.

== First generation (UA1–UA3; 1996) ==
First generation
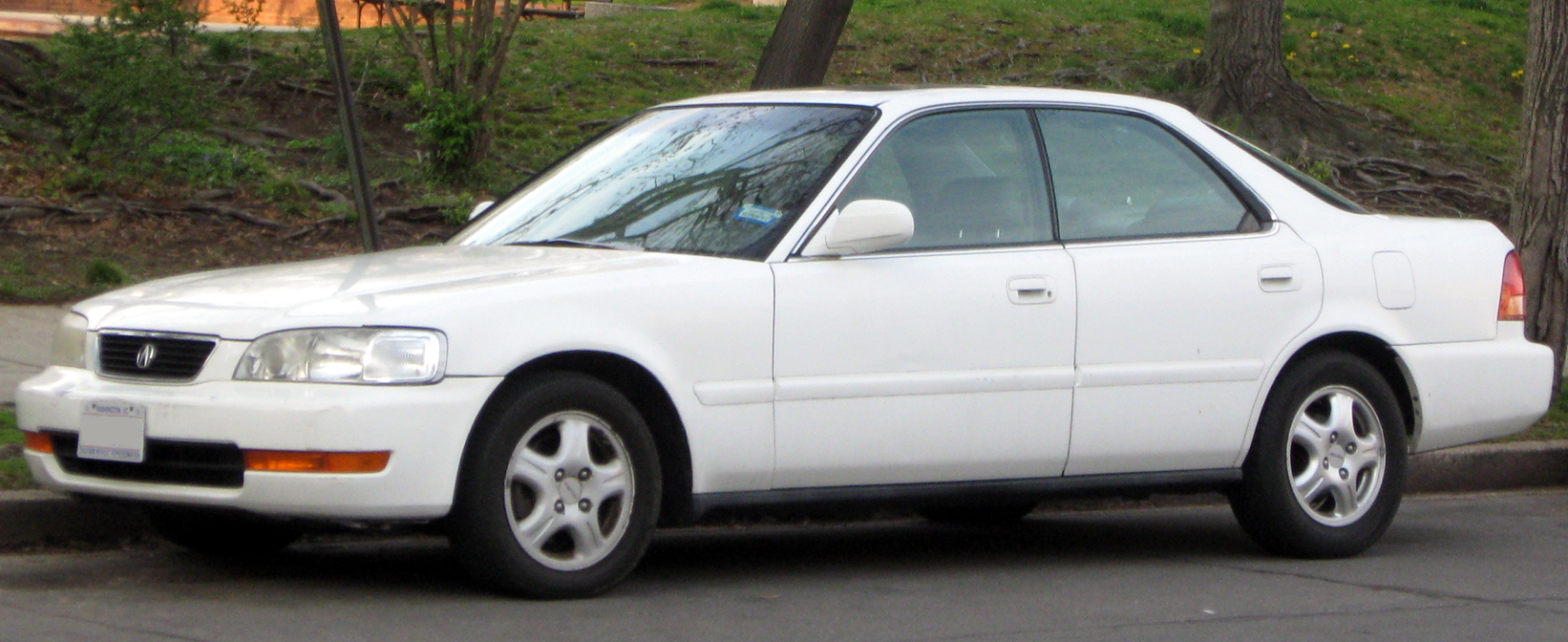
- 1996–1998 Acura TL

Overview
- Also called: Honda Inspire; Honda Saber; Honda Vigor (Thailand & GCC)
- Production: 1995–1998 (US model)
- Model years: 1996–1998
- Assembly: Sayama Plant, Sayama, Saitama, Japan

Body and chassis
- Layout: Longitudinal front-engine, front-wheel drive

Powertrain
- Engine: 2.0 L G20A I5; 2.5 L G25A/G25A4 I5; 3.2 L C32A/C32A6 V6
- Transmission: 4-speed automatic

Dimensions
- Wheelbase: 111.8 in (2,840 mm)
- Length: 2.5TL: 191.5 in (4,864 mm); 3.2TL: 191.7 in (4,869 mm)
- Width: 2.5TL: 70.3 in (1,786 mm); 3.2TL: 70.9 in (1,801 mm)
- Height: 2.5TL: 55.3 in (1,405 mm); 3.2TL: 55.7 in (1,415 mm)

The TL, "Touring Luxury," debuted for the 1996 model year with the 2.5 TL available with the 2.5 L 176 hp (131 kW) SOHC 20-valve 5-cylinder gasoline engine from the Vigor, and the 3.2 TL using the 3.2 L 200 hp (149 kW) SOHC 24v V6 gasoline engine from the second-generation Acura Legend. The model with the 2.0-liter inline-five was not offered in the US market. The debut of the TL signaled Acura's shift from traditional vehicle names to alphanumeric designations; by replacing recognizable names such as "Vigor" and "Legend" with a letter designations, the luxury maker hoped to focus consumer attention on the Acura name. The TL was the first Acura model to adopt the new naming scheme.

The 2.5 TL was positioned as the sporty model, with the 3.2 TL focusing more upon a luxurious ride. Moreover, the added power in the 3.2 TL gave it better acceleration. Both gasoline engines were mounted in a front-rear, or longitudinal position. This contrasted with the more typical transverse engine mount style, and was intended to provide better weight distribution and reduce nose dive. The engine mount design resulted in an elongated hood for the first-generation TL, a shorter front overhang and longer wheelbase, fitting for a near-luxury car. The inline-five engine in the 2.5 TL competed with similar five-cylinder engines offered in Audi and Volvo models.

The first 1996 Acura TL was manufactured at Sayama, Japan on March 28, 1995. Sales of the 2.5 TL began in early 1995, but the 3.2 TL was delayed until late 1995 because of a U.S.-Japan trade dispute. The U.S. government had threatened to impose 100% tariffs on higher-priced Japanese cars in response a growing U.S.-Japan trade deficit. Ultimately a deal was reached which avoided the tariffs.

The first-generation Acura TL had standard features including dual airbags, anti-lock brakes, automatic climate control, a cassette/CD player sound system, and power windows and locks. Leather was standard on the more upscale 3.2 TL, while the 2.5 TL featured a firmer suspension setup. Like its predecessor, the Vigor, this generation TL was a 4-door pillared hardtop, with frameless windows.

=== 1997 ===
In 1997, Acura added a standard power moonroof to all TL models. Additionally, all Acura TLs received a variable-speed intermittent wiper setting. The 3.2 TL had 205/65/15 tires and a V6 motor. The sport-targeted, 5-cylinder 2.5 TL was further fitted with new alloy wheels.

=== 1998 ===
For 1998, Acura made several previously optional features standard on the 2.5 TL. 1998 was the last year of TL production in Japan, as the model was being redesigned for production in the United States.

== Second generation (1999; UA4, UA5) ==
Second generation
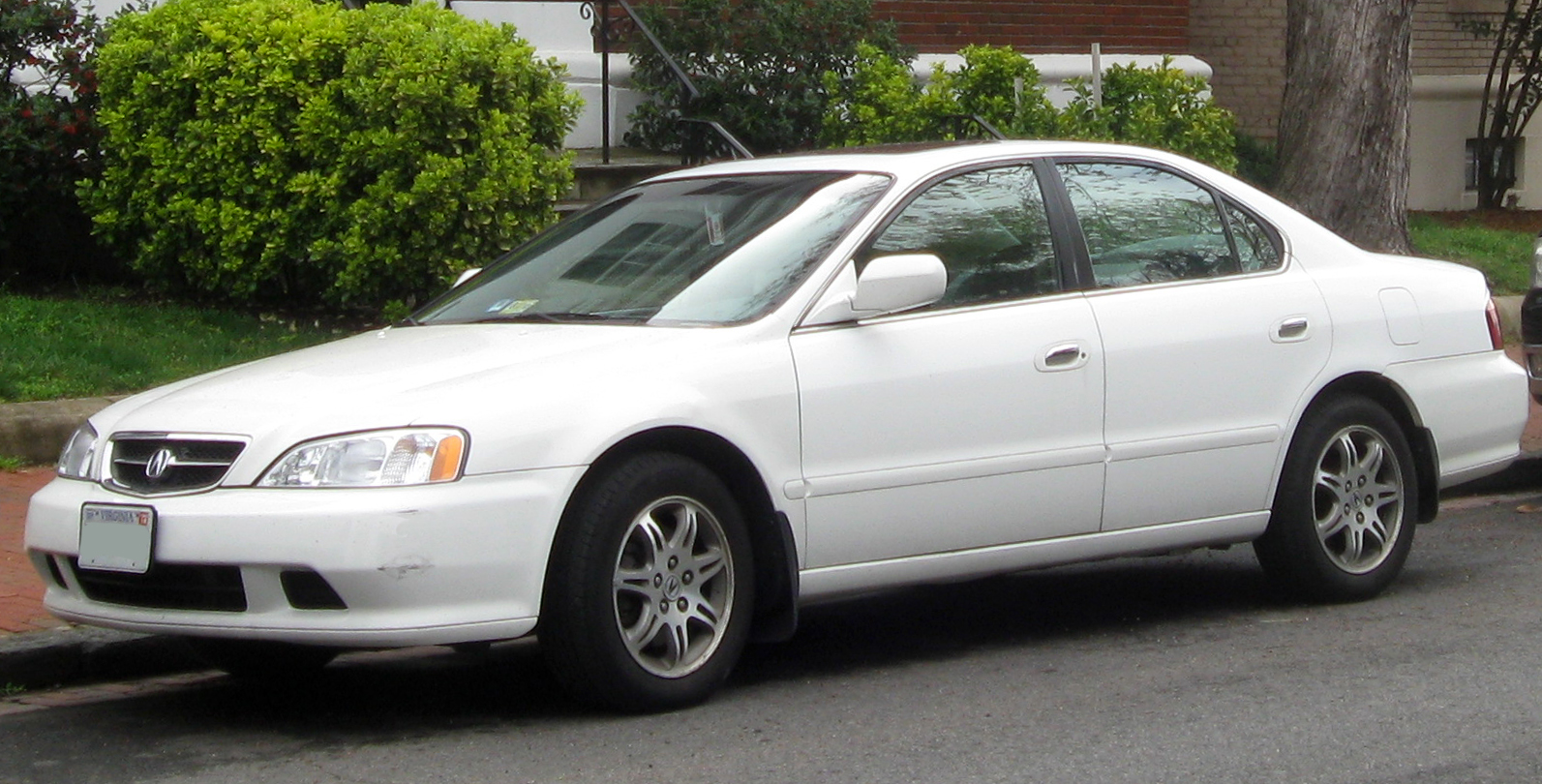
- 1999–2001 Acura TL

Overview
- Also called: Honda Inspire; Honda Saber
- Production: August 1998–September 2003
- Model years: 1999–2003
- Assembly: Marysville, Ohio, United States (Marysville Auto Plant)
- Designer: Young Choi, Michael P. May (1996)

Body and chassis
- Layout: Transverse front-engine, front-wheel drive
- Related: Honda Accord (6th generation); Honda Torneo; Isuzu Aska (4th generation); Acura CL (2nd generation); Honda Odyssey (2nd generation)

Powertrain
- Engine: 2.5 L J25A (Only offered in Japan); 3.2 L J32A, J32A1 (225 hp) V6; 3.2 L J32A2 (260 hp) V6 (Type-S Models)
- Transmission: 4-speed automatic; 5-speed automatic (2000 and later)

Dimensions
- Wheelbase: 108.1 in (2,746 mm)
- Length: 1999–2000: 192.9 in (4,900 mm); 2001–03: 192.5 in (4,890 mm)
- Width: 70.3 in (1,786 mm)
- Height: 1999–2000: 56.1 in (1,425 mm); 2001–03: 53.7 in (1,364 mm)
- Curb weight: 3,500 lb (1,588 kg)

In 1998, Honda revealed the TL-X concept car, showing a preview of the second-generation TL which would debut in late 1998. The second-generation TL (became known as the 3.2 TL) was derived from the US-market Honda Accord platform. It was available with a newly designed 3.2 L 225 hp (168 kW) SOHC VTEC J32 V6 gasoline engine mated to a four-speed electronic automatic transmission with SportShift.

The second-generation 3.2 TL (the 2.5 was dropped) was built in Marysville, Ohio, at Marysville Auto Plant, alongside the Honda Accord. These cars were imported into Japan and sold as the Honda Inspire in the Honda Clio dealer network, and as the Honda Saber in the Honda Verno dealer network. The main difference between the two cars were the front grille; the Inspire and Saber were also available with a 2.5 L Honda J-series V6 exclusive to the Japanese market.

The first 1999 Acura TL was assembled on August 4, 1998. The only option on the sedan was a CD-based navigation system. The 1999 TL's navigation system stored the maps in zones; there were 5 different zones for the U.S. Starting with this generation, cabin air filters (also known as pollen filters) located behind the glove compartment were installed as standard equipment.

=== 2000 ===
In the second year of production, the Acura TL was given a few more features, including a 5-speed automatic transmission with SportShift. The added gear allowed for slightly better fuel economy and acceleration when compared to the previous 4-speed automatic transmission with SportShift. With this model, if the driver forgets the 1-2 shift, the computer will take over when in sport mode and do the 1–2 up and down shifts, unlike the 4-speed 1999 model. In many vehicles, the 5-speed automatic transmission was very unreliable: as the third gear clutch pack wore, particles blocked off oil passages, causing overheating or preventing the transmission from shifting or holding gears normally; symptoms included slippage, failure to shift, or sudden downshifting making the car come to a screeching halt even at freeway speeds. This problem was highlighted in the Los Angeles Times in September 2002. Consumer Reports took note and gave the TL and CL the "black spot," the worst rating for transmission reliability. In response to the recurring problem, the manufacturer extended the warranty covering the transmission to 7 years or 100,000 miles (160,000 km) on American models. A class-action lawsuit was settled to extend the transmission warranty for U.S. owners or entities to 7.75 years for all models made from 1998 to 2002, and some 2003 models by VIN; however, Canadian owners' warranties were not extended. Transmissions replaced prior to March 2005 usually fail again. Transmissions replaced from March 2005 and later include a redesigned third gear clutch pack reported to fix the problem.

Other notable changes included the addition of side impact airbags for the front passengers and a change of format for the navigation system. The 2000 TL switched from a CD database to a DVD-based navigation system. The entire continental United States became accessible with the navigation system, and it was possible to drive from one coast to the other.

=== 2001 ===
For the 2001 model year, Acura introduced the new CL Type S (2001–2003) which was a sportier trim of the Acura CL (1996–2003). While it was mechanically identical to the TL, its sales never came close to that of its sibling model, and as a result, it was discontinued in May 2003. The 2001 TL received a redesigned cupholder insert. The automatic transmissions in these cars were also defective. In response to the recurring problem, the manufacturer extended the warranty covering the transmission to 109,000 miles (175,400 km) or 7.75 years for all 1999-2002 models and certain 2003 models per the vehicle identification number, with Acura dealers replacing the transmissions under warranty. Transmissions replaced prior to March 2005 usually failed again, but transmissions replaced in March 2005 and later include a redesigned third gear clutch pack reported to fix the problem.

=== 2002 ===
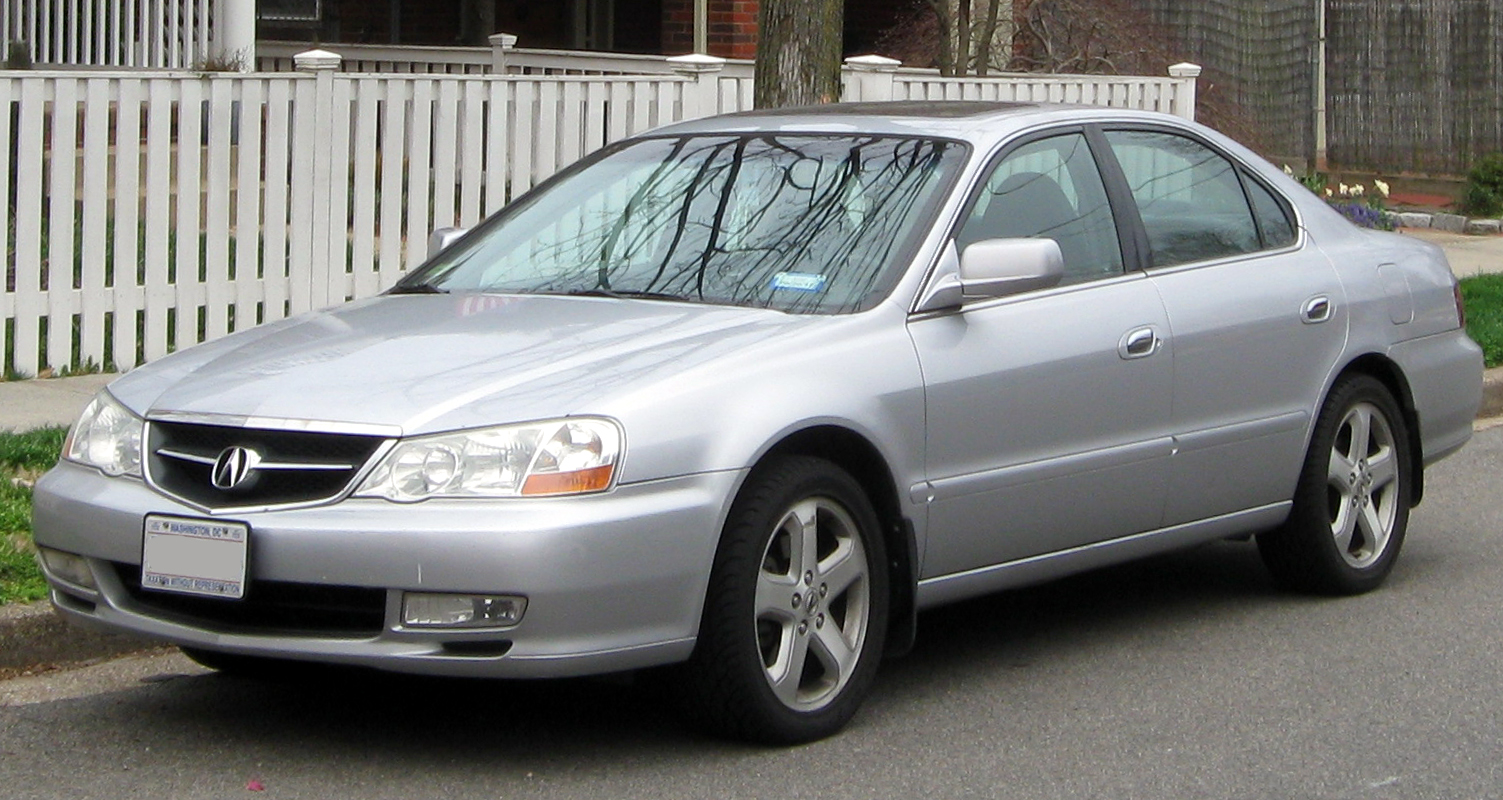
2002-2003 refreshed Acura 3.2 TL

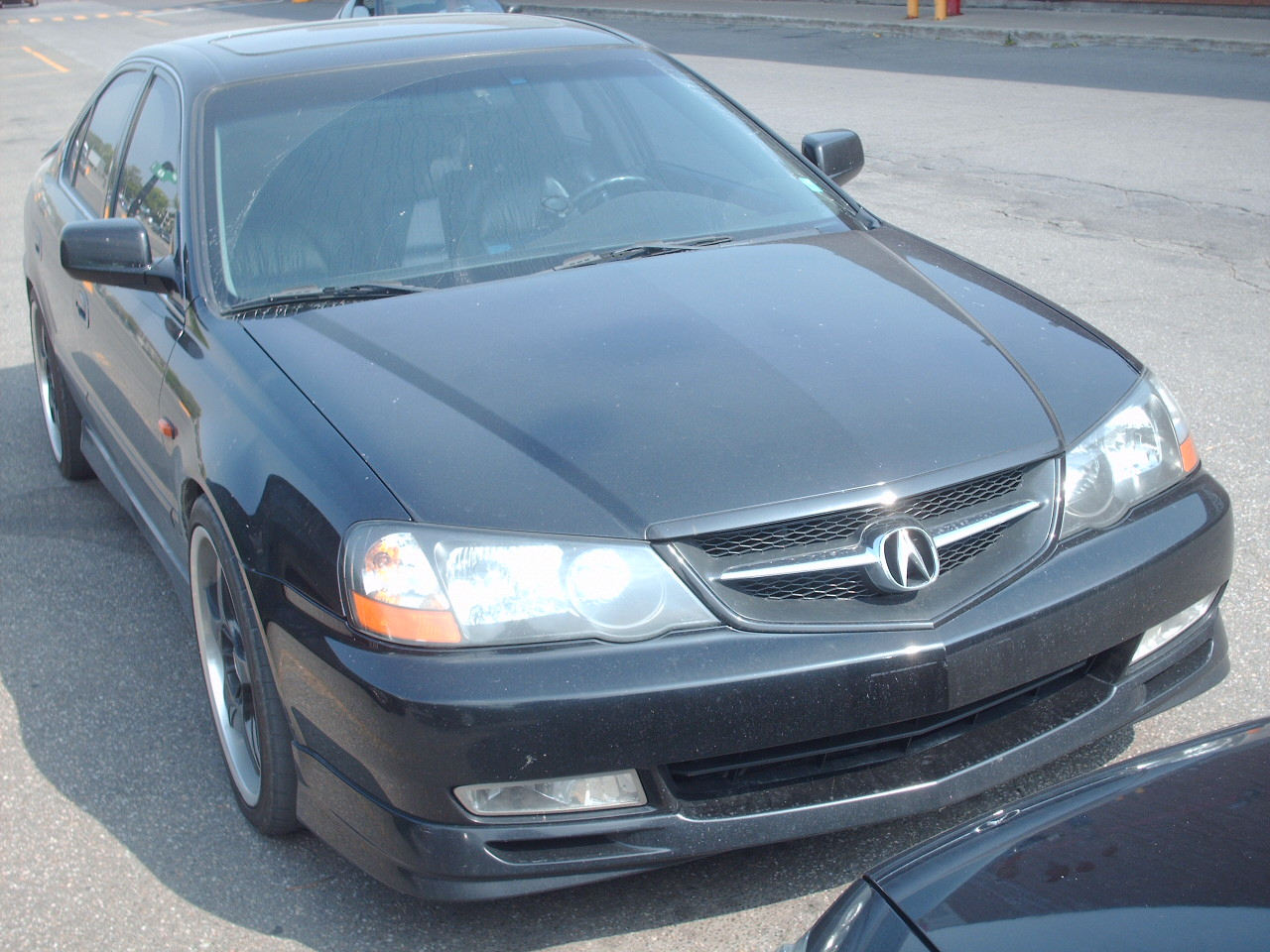
Acura 3.2 TL A-Spec

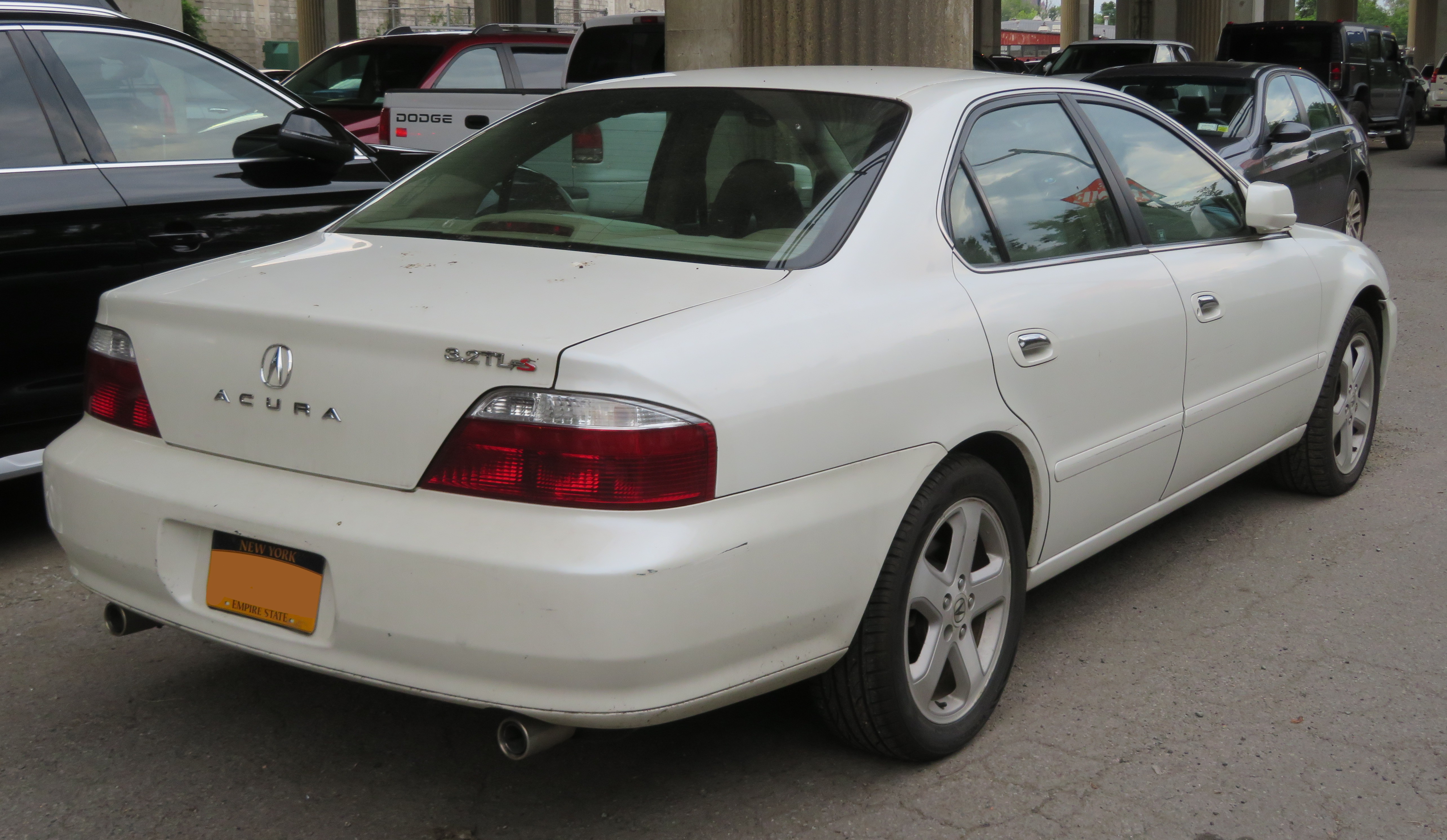
Acura TL (2002 facelift; rear)

In March 2001 for the 2002 model year, the TL got a minor makeover, with a refreshed front fascia, redesigned taillights, a 6 CD in-dash changer as well as a few other features.

==== Type-S ====
A Type-S model was also added, adding 35 hp (26 kW) for a total of 260 bhp (194 kW) at 6100 rpm and 232 lb⋅ft (315 N⋅m) of torque at 3500–5500 rpm. It also featured 17-inch (430 mm) wheels, firmer seats and suspension. A large percentage of these vehicles exhibited problems with the automatic transmission necessitating replacement. In response to the recurring problem, the manufacturer extended the warranty covering the transmission to 109,000 miles (175,400 km) or 7.75 years for all 1999–2002 models and 2003 partial per VIN. Acura dealers replace the transmissions under warranty. Transmissions replaced prior to March 2005 usually fail again. Transmissions replaced March 2005 and later include a redesigned third gear clutch pack reported to fix the problem.

=== 2003 ===
Only minor changes occurred for this model year in order to make way for a redesign. One odd and notable addition to only the 2003 model year was the addition of a General Motors OnStar subscription cellular telephone and navigation assistance service to the DVD GPS navigation system option. These were separate independent systems, each with their own GPS receivers. The OnStar system was based on a dated Motorola analog cellular technology operating over 1G AMPS. Because of this and the failure of Acura to offer a digital upgrade, the TL OnStar system became defunct in 2009 when US carriers were allowed to turn off analog AMPS cell tower equipment.

Certain vehicles in the 2002 and 2003 model years were the subject of a safety recall in July 2009 for injuries reported from faulty driver's side airbag inflators. In February 2010, another recall was issued for the same problem.

== Third generation (UA6/7; 2004) ==
Third generation
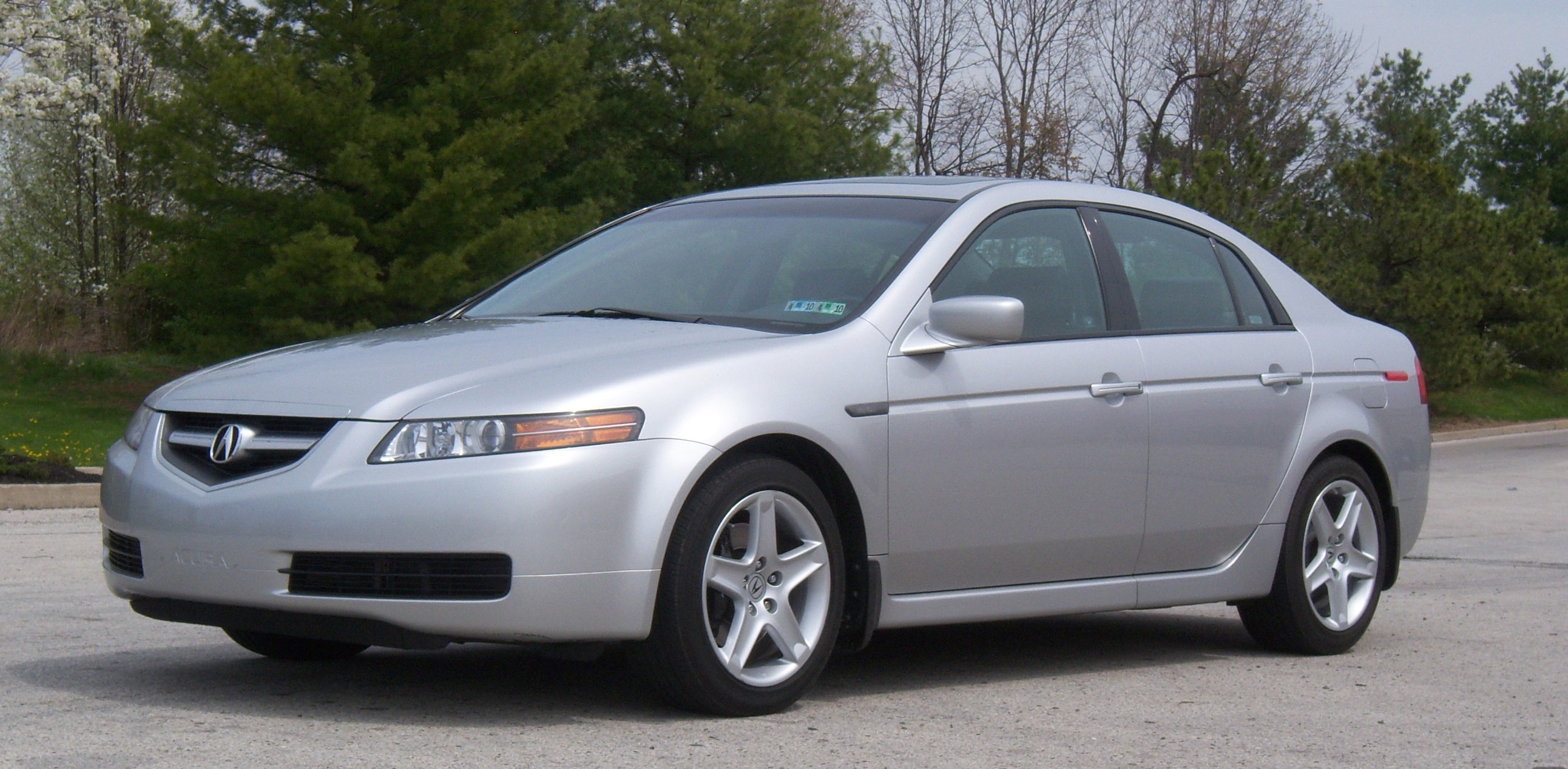
- 2004–2006 Acura TL

Overview
- Production: September 2003–August 2008
- Model years: 2004–2008
- Assembly: Marysville, Ohio, United States (Marysville Auto Plant)
- Designer: Jon Ikeda (2001)

Body and chassis
- Layout: Transverse front-engine, front-wheel drive
- Related: Honda Accord (N.A 7th generation); Honda Accord (7th generation); Acura TSX

Powertrain
- Engine: 3.2 L J32A3 V6; 3.5 L J35A8 V6 (Type-S)
- Transmission: 5-speed automatic; 6-speed manual

Dimensions
- Wheelbase: 107.9 in (2,741 mm)
- Length: 189.3 in (4,808 mm); Type-S: 189.8 in (4,821 mm)
- Width: 72.2 in (1,834 mm)
- Height: 56.7 in (1,440 mm)
- Curb weight: 3,480 lb (1,579 kg)

=== 2004 ===
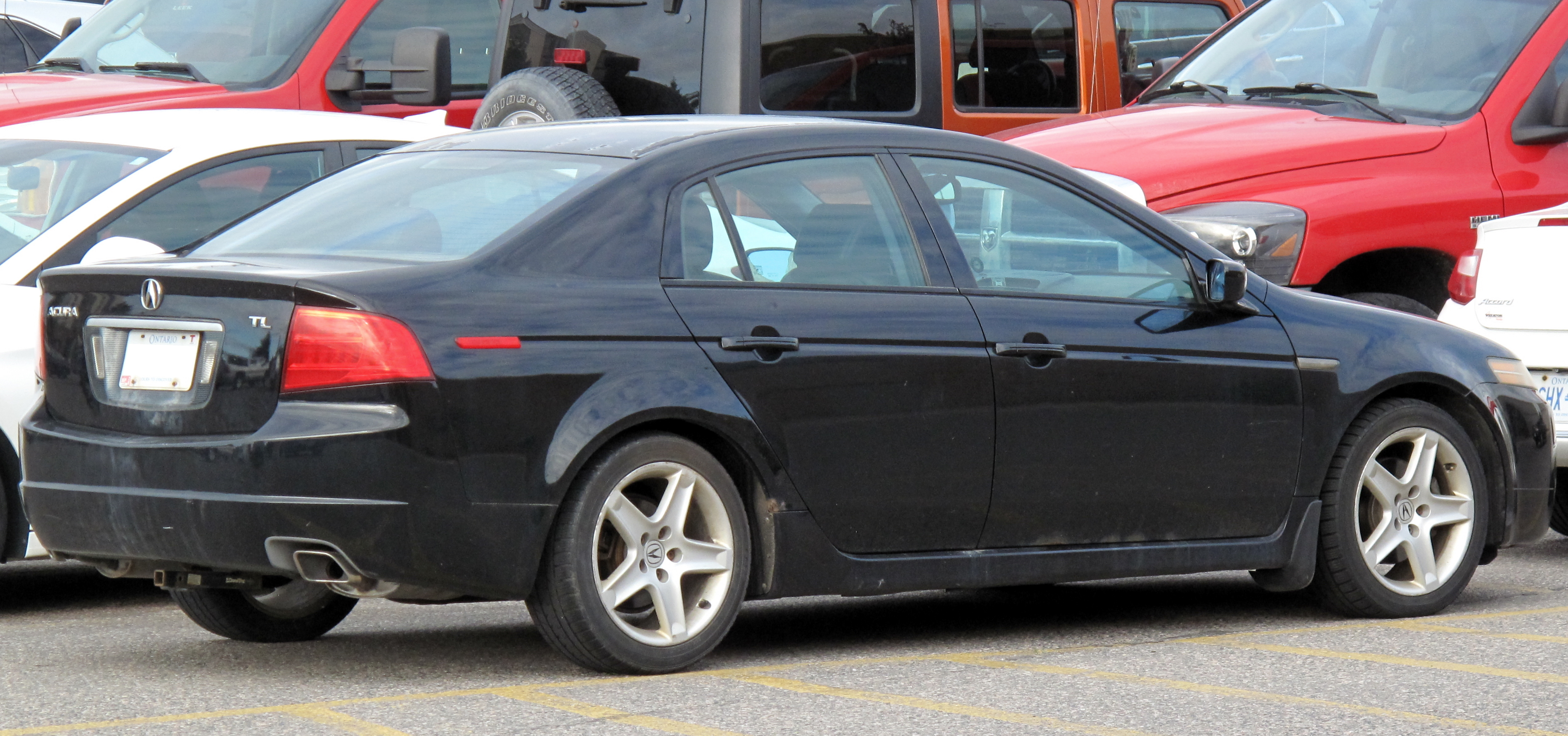
2004–2006 Acura TL (Canada)

In October 2003, the third-generation Acura TL (the 3.2 moniker was dropped) was released for sale in North America. Developed mainly in the United States by a team led by Erik Berkman, with bodywork by American Honda designer Jon Ikeda, the new TL was built in Marysville, Ohio, and was derived from the seventh generation US-market Honda Accord.

Starting with this generation, this model was not sold in Japan, with the Honda Inspire instead holding the position of entry-level luxury sedan below the Honda Legend. The Inspire of this era was instead sold as the seventh generation North American-spec Honda Accord.

It is powered by a 270 hp (201 kW) – later revised to 258 hp (192 kW) based on the new SAE measurement standard for horsepower – and 233 lb⋅ft (316 N⋅m) of torque, 3.2 L 24 valve SOHC VTEC V6 gasoline engine mated to either a "SportShift" manually controllable 5-speed automatic with or 6-speed manual. Manual transmission models featured Brembo 4-piston front brake calipers, a Torsen-type limited-slip differential, stiffer anti-roll bars front and rear and performance tires at no additional cost.

In March 2004, Honda began offering a factory-sanctioned "tuner package" version of the TL called the TL A-SPEC. This version featured a suspension tuned by Makoto Tamamura, an indication of the TL A-SPEC's aggressive engineering. In addition, an underbody kit, spoiler, limited edition A-SPEC steering wheel, "A-SPEC" badge on the back, and 18-inch (460 mm) wheels are standard. When installed at purchase, the car's 4-year/ 50,000 miles (80,000 km) warranty applied to the package as well.

The third-generation TL was also the first car in the American market to include a 6-disc DVD-Audio system, output through an 8-speaker 225-watt system, engineered by Panasonic and tuned by Grammy Award-winning sound engineer Elliot Scheiner. The system also plays back CDs as well as DTS audio discs, CD-Audio, CD-Rs and CD-RWs but not MP3s. In the United States, all models were also equipped with a Bluetooth HandsFree Link (HFL) system, integrated with the audio system, to allow for hands-free usage of one's cell phone (provided the phone also supports Bluetooth and is compatible with the HFL's hands-free profile). In Canada, the HFL feature was not available on the base model (standard with A-Spec, Technology, and Navigation packages), though the 2005 model year saw HFL becoming standard in all Canadian models. With the built-in XM Radio tuner, owners can elect to pay a monthly subscription after the complimentary 3-month subscription expires from Acura for XM radio, which provides over 100 digital channels via satellite.

With the optional Alpine-designed navigation system, the third-generation TL can also accept voice commands like "find nearest police station" or "go home." The DVD navigation system features an 8-inch (200 mm) touchscreen LCD, which allows for easy viewing of the road ahead. DVDs with new road information for the navigation system were made annually until 2014.

The JDM Honda Inspire debuted around four and a half months earlier (on June 11, 2003) and marked the branching out of the TL line from the Inspire. The Inspire is basically a seventh-generation US-market Honda Accord V6 with minor trim changes, and the addition of Variable Cylinder Management, which shuts off half of the engine when not needed to boost fuel economy. The Saber was discontinued and the new Inspire is being sold at Clio, Primo, and Verno dealerships.

The TL became Acura's best-selling luxury sedan in 2004 with more than 79,000 sold that year.

The Insurance Institute for Highway Safety (IIHS) found the Acura TL had the second-lowest accident fatality rate among midsize luxury cars.

=== 2005 ===
The 2005 TL received a front passenger-side airbag cut-off switch and indicator and extra stitching on the front seats. There were also several unpublished minor changes made, such as changes in seat belt anchor mounts.

=== 2006 ===
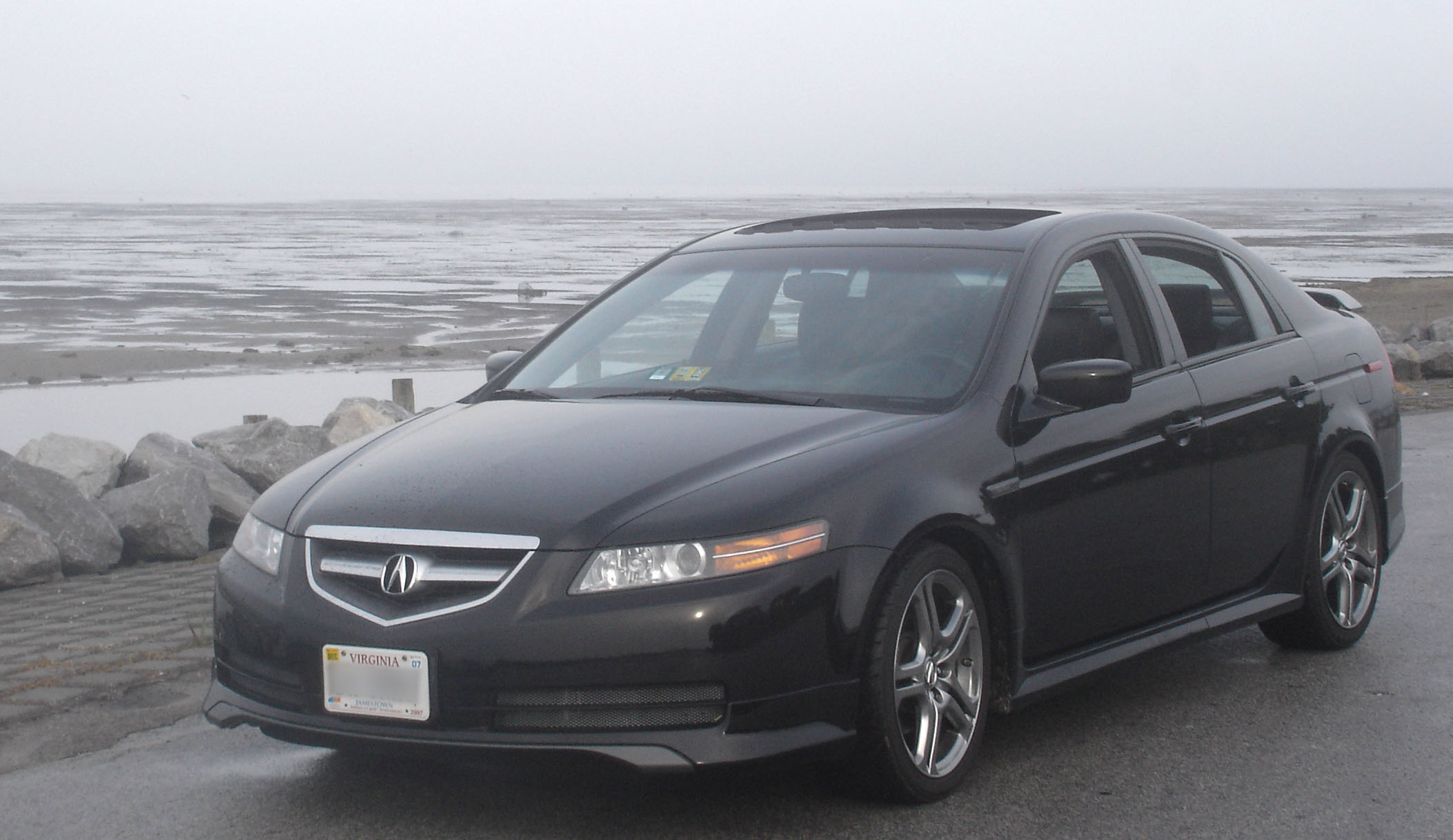
2006 Acura TL A-Spec

The 2006 TL received a tire pressure monitoring system (TPMS) and a new engine management system to help reduce torque steer. The new horsepower rating of 258 hp (192 kW) was due to a change in testing procedures, with the engine remaining technically the same since 2004.

=== 2007 ===
The 2007 Acura TL featured a slightly revised exterior as well as a revised interior with a new steering wheel, redesigned gauges, and footwell lighting, in addition to new interior and exterior colors. The 2007 TL (non Type-S) received suspension changes to improve ride comfort. Also new for the 2007 model year were LED turn signal repeaters on the side mirrors and fog lamps in the bumper. Prior to 2007, the fog lamps were integrated into the headlight housing; daytime running lights (DRLs) occupied that space; since 2004, Canadian models had DRLs there rather than the fog lamps.

TL models with navigation models featured a new rear-view camera with the image displayed on the navigation screen, as well as XM NavTraffic. In addition to the new standard auxiliary audio jack, the sound system was MP3/WMA compatible and offers Dolby Pro Logic II decoding and speed-sensitive volume compensation. The manual transmission option was dropped from the base TL due largely to extremely low sales; only 1 out of 40 TLs sold across America were equipped with a manual gearbox.

Acura also introduced a new 5-speed automatic transmission for the 2007 and 2008 model year TLs. Changes included downshift "rev matching", slightly altered gear ratios, and a different bellhousing. The transmission was identical between the base model and Type-S. The block on the base model's 3.2-liter engine was changed to accommodate for the new bellhousing.

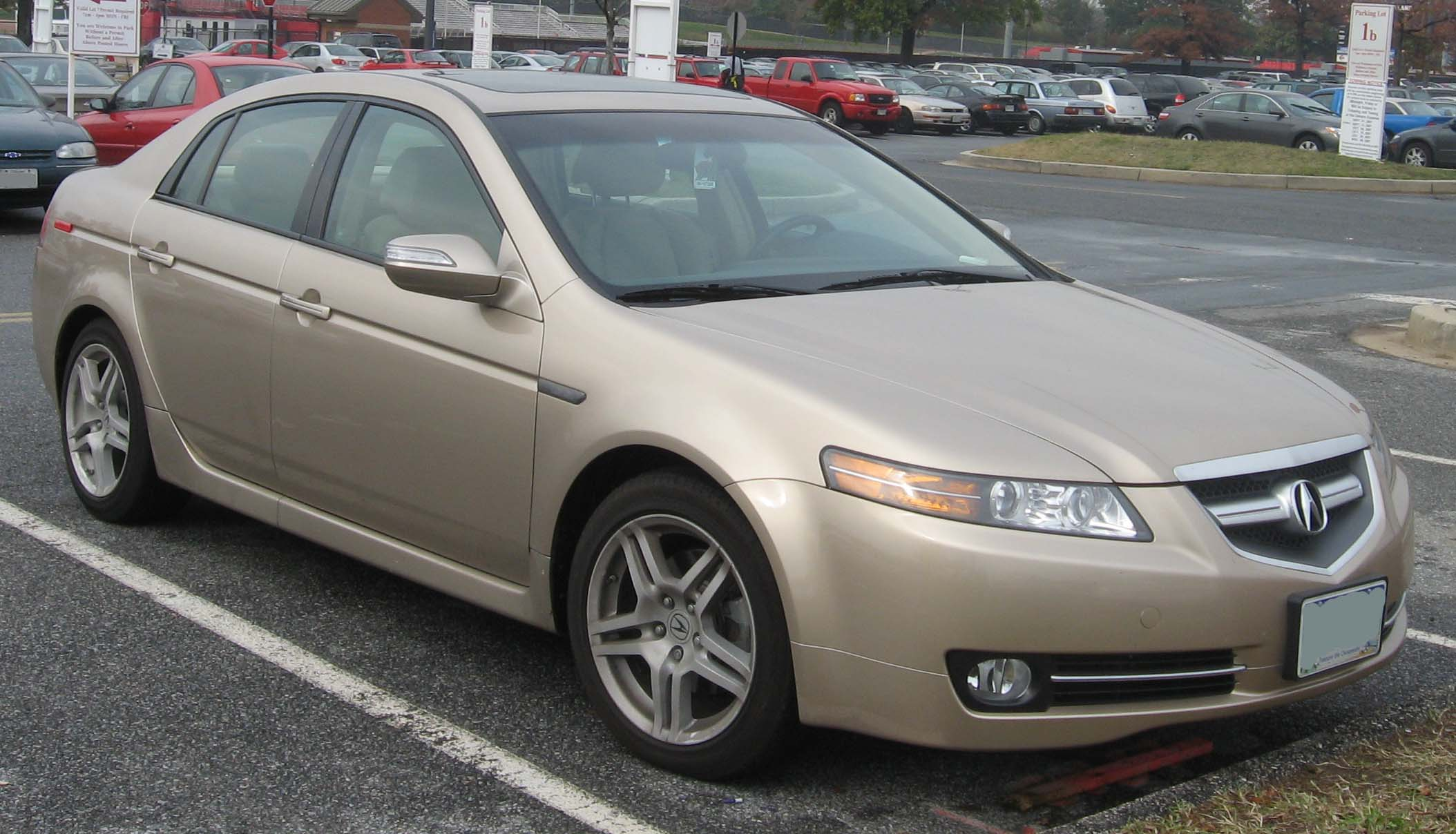
2007-2008 Acura TL (US)

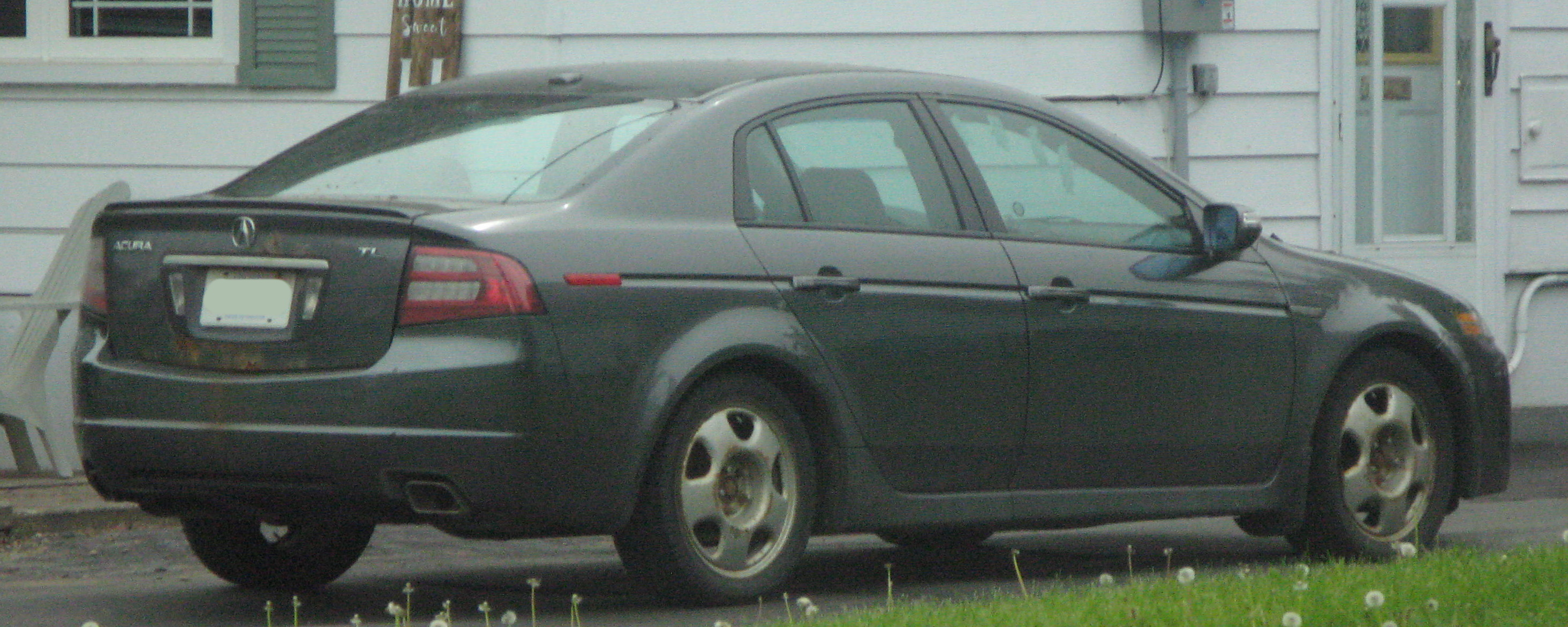
Rear view (2007-2008 model, US)

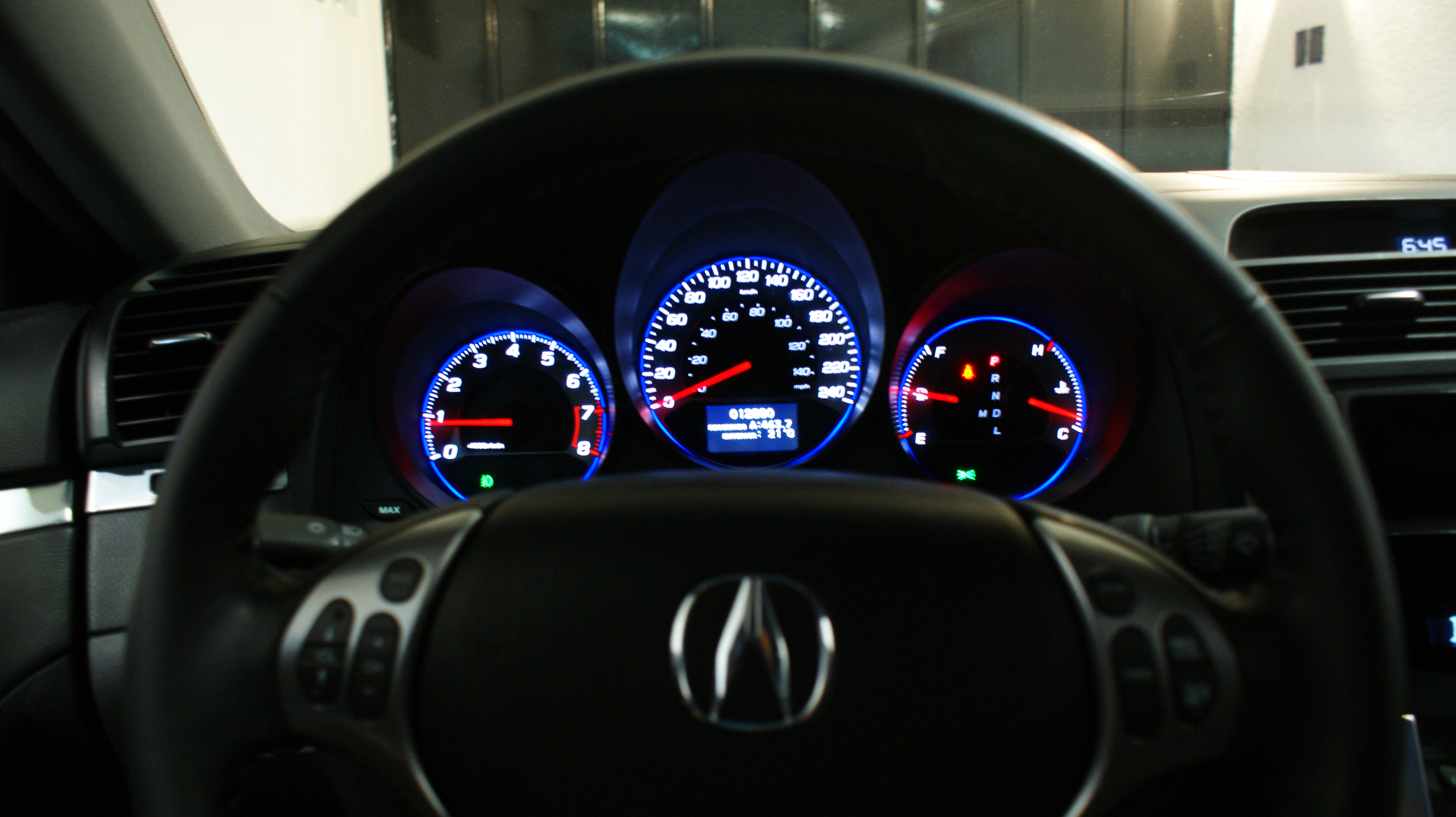
2008 Acura TL interior gauges

==== Type-S ====
The most notable addition during the 2007 revision was the return of the Type-S edition of the TL. The Acura TL Type-S received the Acura RL's 3.5-liter J35A8 V6 gasoline engine tuned to 286 horsepower (213 kW) and 256 lb-ft of torque with either a 5-speed automatic with F1 style paddle shifters or a 6-speed manual transmission. The manual transmission includes a limited-slip differential.

Exterior differences included quad exhaust pipes, restyled rear lamps and front fascia, lip spoiler, wider side sills, Brembo brakes, 17-inch dark silver 10-spoke wheels, an upgraded suspension which included bigger stabilizer bars, lower front spring rates, upgraded bushings and dampers, a "black chrome" grille rather than the standard glossy grille, and exclusive Type-S badging, plus an exclusive new color option, Kinetic Blue Pearl.

The interior had Type-S badging on the steering wheel and headrests, more highly bolstered front seats, two-tone seats (only with the Ebony/Silver interior), metal racing pedals, carbon fiber trim, and red interior lighting as opposed to blue in the base TL. Touchscreen navigation was standard and the suspension has been firmed up. The only options are the aforementioned transmission and high-performance summer tires (Bridgestone Potenzas) rather than the standard all-season tires (Michelin Pilot MXM4s).

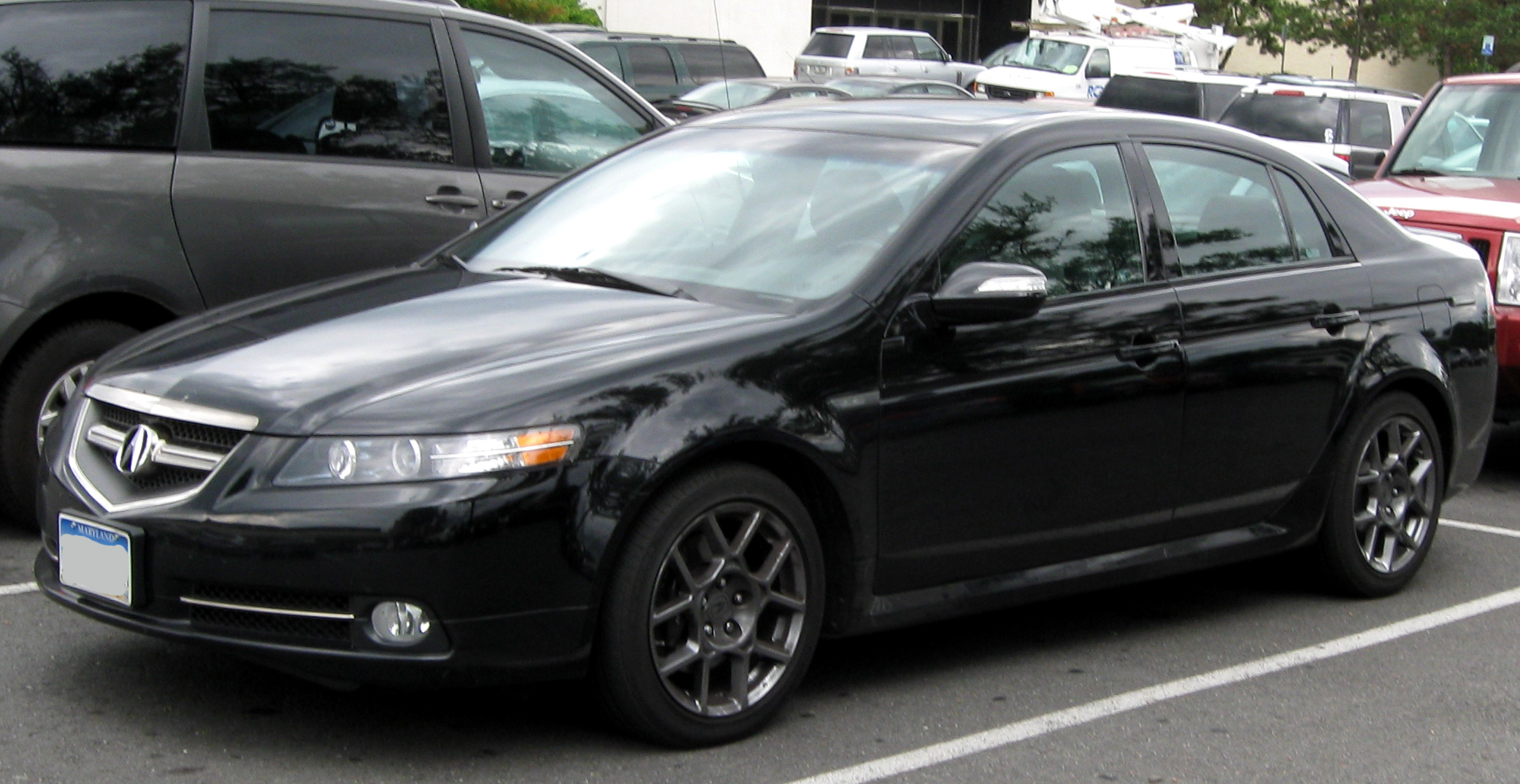
2007 Acura TL Type-S

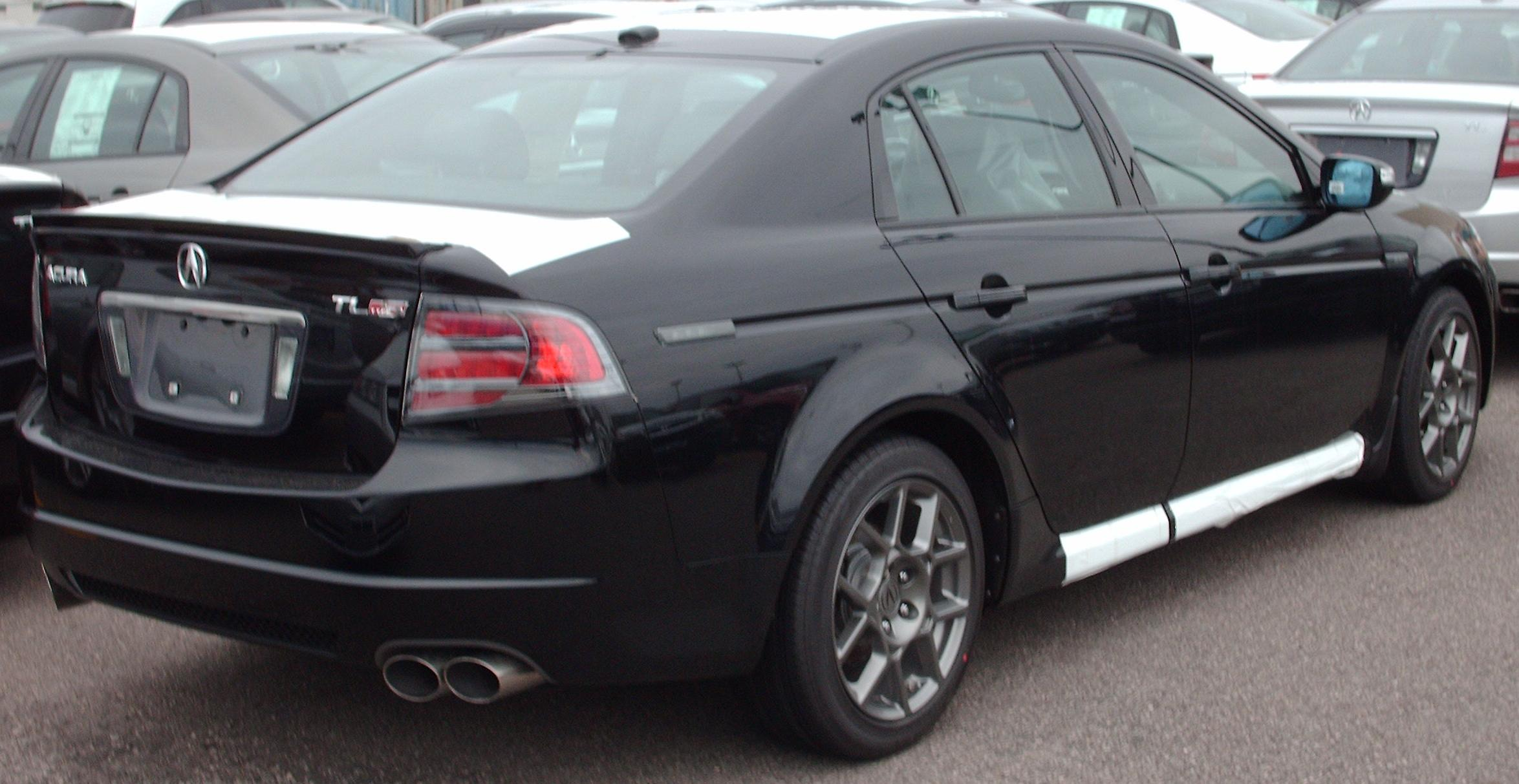
Rear view

=== 2008 ===
The 2008 TL featured an improved new immobilizer system, and a separate TPMS warning lamp. The navigation system was updated to work in Hawaii, and the AcuraLink satellite capability was expanded to incorporate 76 markets, up from 38 markets in the 2007 model.

=== Performance ===
- Zero to 60 mph (97 km/h): (Type-S 3.5L V6) 5.7sec, (3.2L V6 MT) 5.9sec & (3.2L V6 AT) 6 sec
- Zero to 100 mph (160 km/h): 13.9 sec
- Zero to 110 mph (180 km/h): 19.6 sec
- Standing 1/4-mile (~400 m): 14.1 sec @ 101 mph (163 km/h)
- Top speed (governor limited): 152 mph (245 km/h)
- Braking, 70–0 mph: 163 ft (50 m)
- Roadholding, 300 ft (91 m)-dia skidpad: 0.93 g

== Fourth generation (UA8 2009, UA9 2009 SH-AWD) ==
Fourth generation
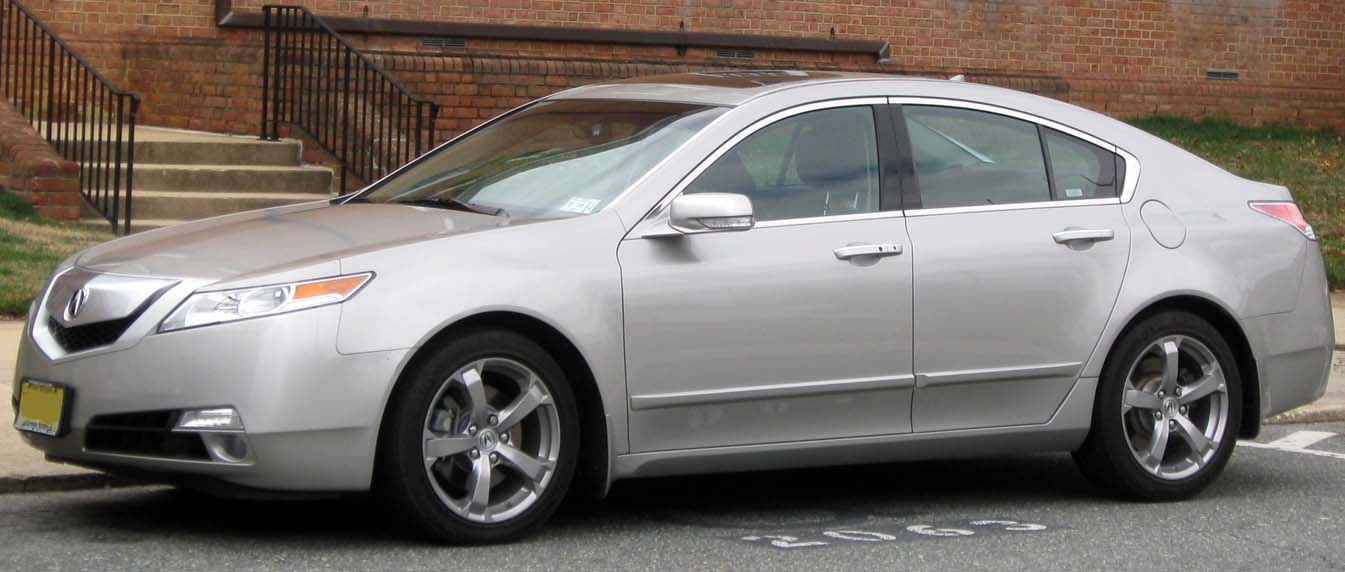
- 2009–2011 Acura TL

Overview
- Production: September 2008–March 2014
- Model years: 2009–2014
- Assembly: Marysville, Ohio, United States (Marysville Auto Plant)
- Designer: Dave Marek (2006)

Body and chassis
- Layout: Front engine, front-wheel drive / all-wheel drive
- Related: Honda Accord (North America eighth generation); Honda Inspire; Honda Accord (Japan and Europe eighth generation); Acura TSX; Honda Spirior

Powertrain
- Engine: 3.5 L J35Z6 (280 hp) V6; 3.7 L J37A4 (305 hp) V6 (SH-AWD)
- Transmission: 5-speed automatic (2009–2011); 6-speed automatic (2012–2014); 6-speed manual; (2010-2014)

Dimensions
- Wheelbase: 109.3 in (2,776 mm)
- Length: 194.0 in (4,928 mm) (2012-2014); 195.5 in (4,966 mm) (2009-2011)
- Width: 74.0 in (1,880 mm)
- Height: 57.2 in (1,453 mm)
- Curb weight: 3,699 lb (1,678 kg) (Base); 3,948 lb (1,791 kg) (SH-AWD); 3,873 lb (1,757 kg) (6MT SH-AWD)

The first fourth-generation Acura TL rolled off the assembly line on September 23, 2008. Debuted for the 2009 model year, the new generation of TL featured a more aggressive interpretation of Acura's latest styling vocabulary, known as "Keen Edge Dynamic." Featured prominently on the front was the controversial "Power Plenum" upper grille. The size of the car was increased slightly, with the wheelbase being stretched 1.4 inches (36 mm) to 109.3 inches (2,780 mm). The car was also 6.2 inches (160 mm) longer overall, 1.8 inches (46 mm) wider and 0.5-inch (13 mm) taller. As a result, rear legroom improved by 1.3 inches (33 mm) and rear shoulder room increased by 0.5-inch (13 mm). Structural rigidity was increased due to the use of high-strength steel in 47.6 percent of the chassis.

The base TL was front-wheel drive and is powered by a 3.5-liter V6 gasoline engine that makes 280 hp (210 kW) and 254 lb⋅ft (344 N⋅m) of torque, an increase of 22 hp (16 kW) and 21 lb⋅ft (28 N⋅m) over the previous 3.2-liter V6. The new TL SH-AWD ("Super-Handling All-Wheel Drive") was the first TL to have an all-wheel drive system, and replaces the previous TL Type-S. It was given a more powerful 3.7-liter V6 gasoline engine that produces 305 hp (227 kW) and 275 lb⋅ft (373 N⋅m) of torque, an increase of 19 hp (14 kW) and 19 lb⋅ft (26 N⋅m) over the 3.5-liter V6 of the Type-S. Acura originally advertised it as having 307 hp (229 kW), but revised that claim without any explanation after a few months on the market. The 3.7-liter engine also uses VTEC variable-lift timing on both the intake and exhaust valves; the base TL and previous models only applied VTEC to the intake valves.

SH-AWD ("Super Handling" All Wheel Drive) is a multi-vectoring all wheel drive system designed more for performance than for simply providing traction in adverse circumstances. While cruising, the system sends 90% of the power to the front wheels and 10% to the rear wheels. Acceleration sends more torque on the rear wheels; the car can put up to 70% of the total available power to the rear wheels to assist with rapid acceleration, and of that 70%, 100% can be pushed to either the left or right wheel in order to assist the vehicle through a corner.

The brakes on the new TL were increased in size from the older 11.8 in (300 mm) front disc and 11.1 in (280 mm) rear disc, to Ridgeline-sized 12.6 in (320 mm) front discs and 13.2 in (340 mm) rear disc, still incorporating an internal rear drum e-brake while maintaining hydraulic discs for the foot applied brakes. The bolt pattern on the car is no longer a 5 x 114.3 mm (4.50 in) but a 5 x 120 mm (4.7 in) for this generation.

The SH-AWD model also included some interior refinements over the base model, and is tuned for slightly firmer suspension and steering feedback. The exterior is visually distinguishable from the base model by an SH-AWD badge on the trunk, quad exhaust pipes (as opposed to dual exhaust on the base model) and larger air ducts in the front bumper to cool the larger brakes (the base model's turn signal indicators in the bumper extend all the way to the center.) The TL rides on 245/50R17 tires, while the TL SH-AWD has 245/45R18 tires with optional 245/40ZR19 summer performance tires. Both models use electric power steering rather than hydraulic, and a revised five-speed automatic transmission (2012+ models received the 6-speed automatic) featuring shift paddles on the steering wheel is standard equipment for both models.

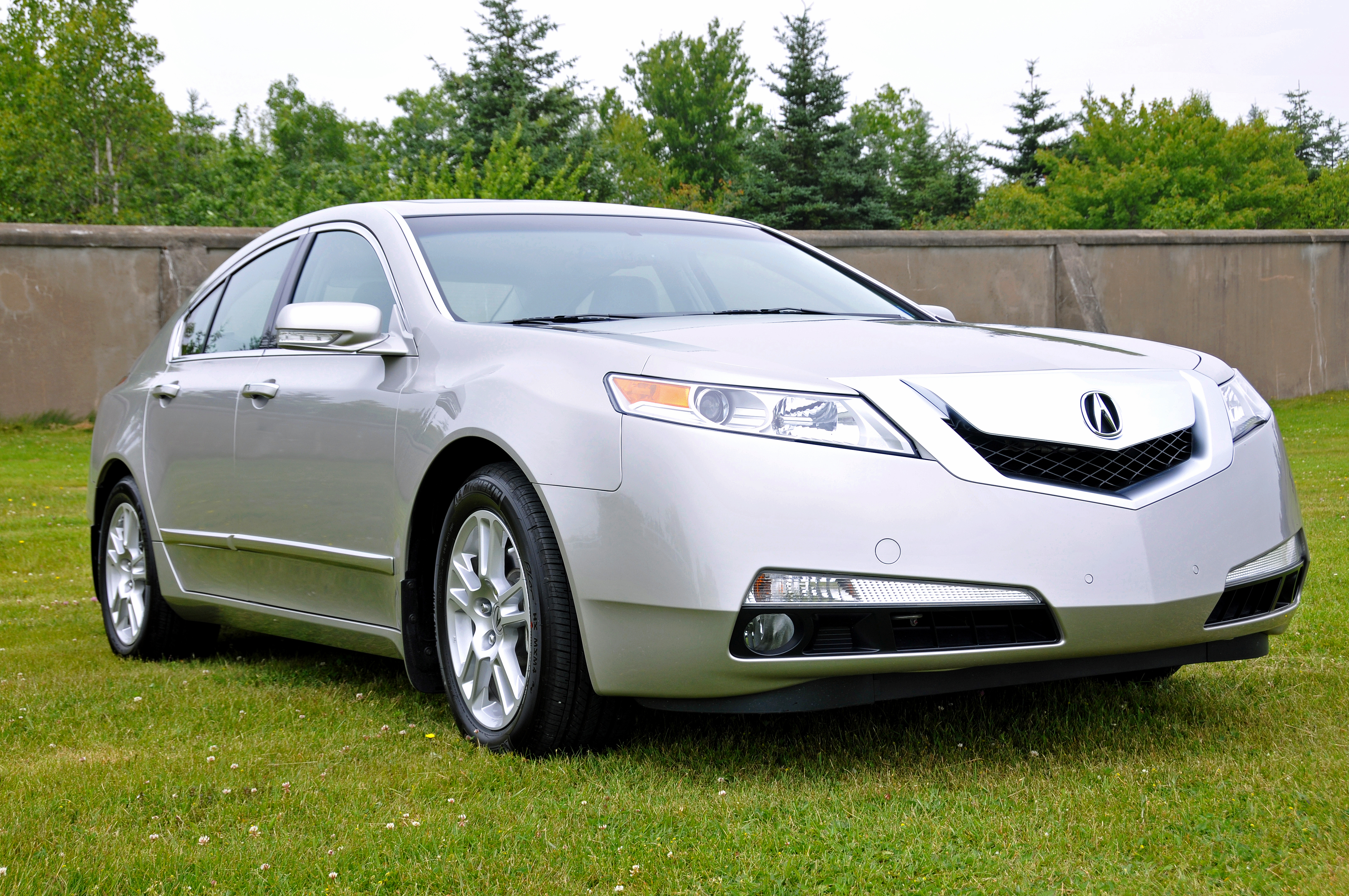
2009-2011 Acura TL (US)

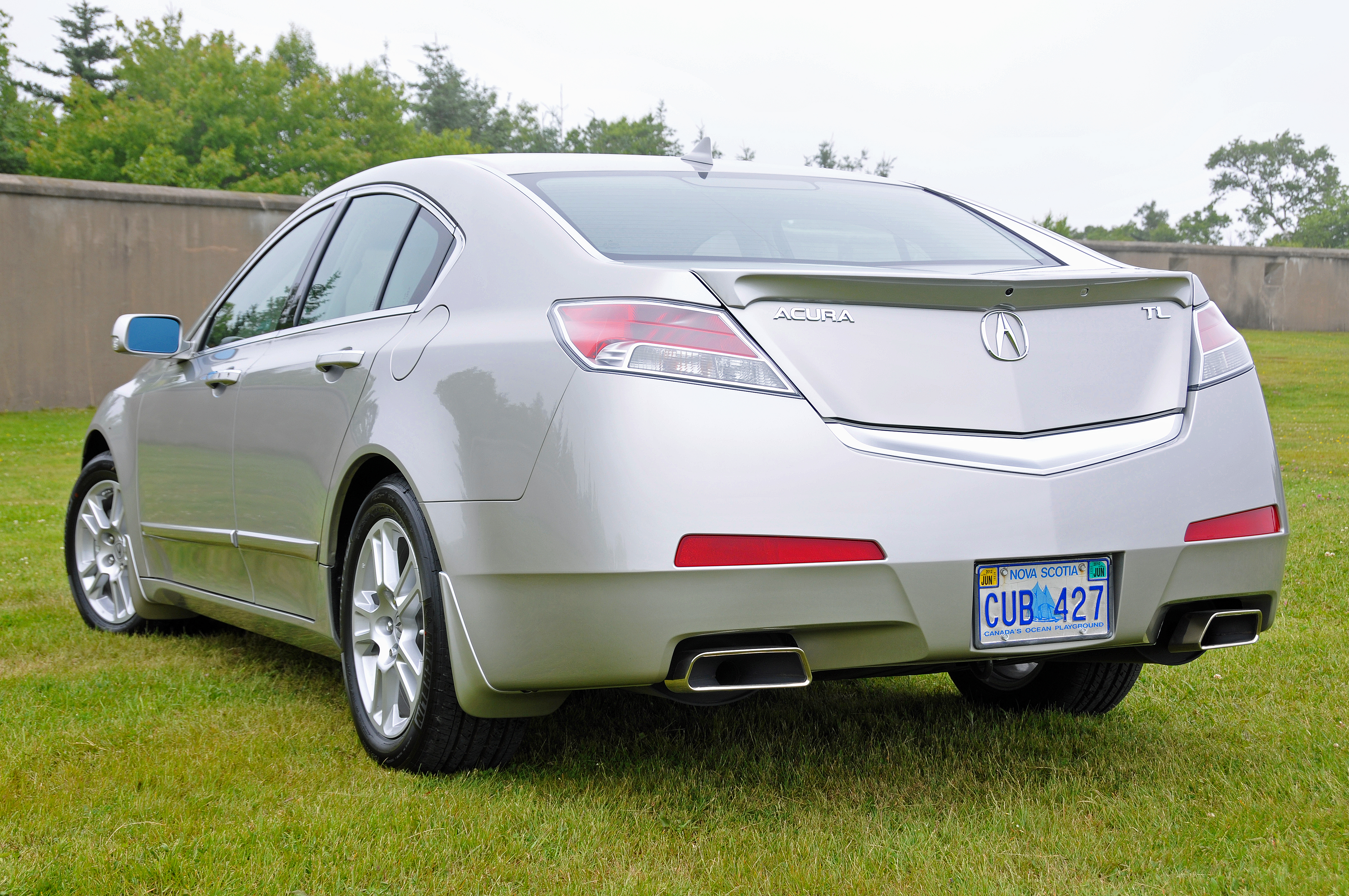
Rear view (US, 2009-2011 model)

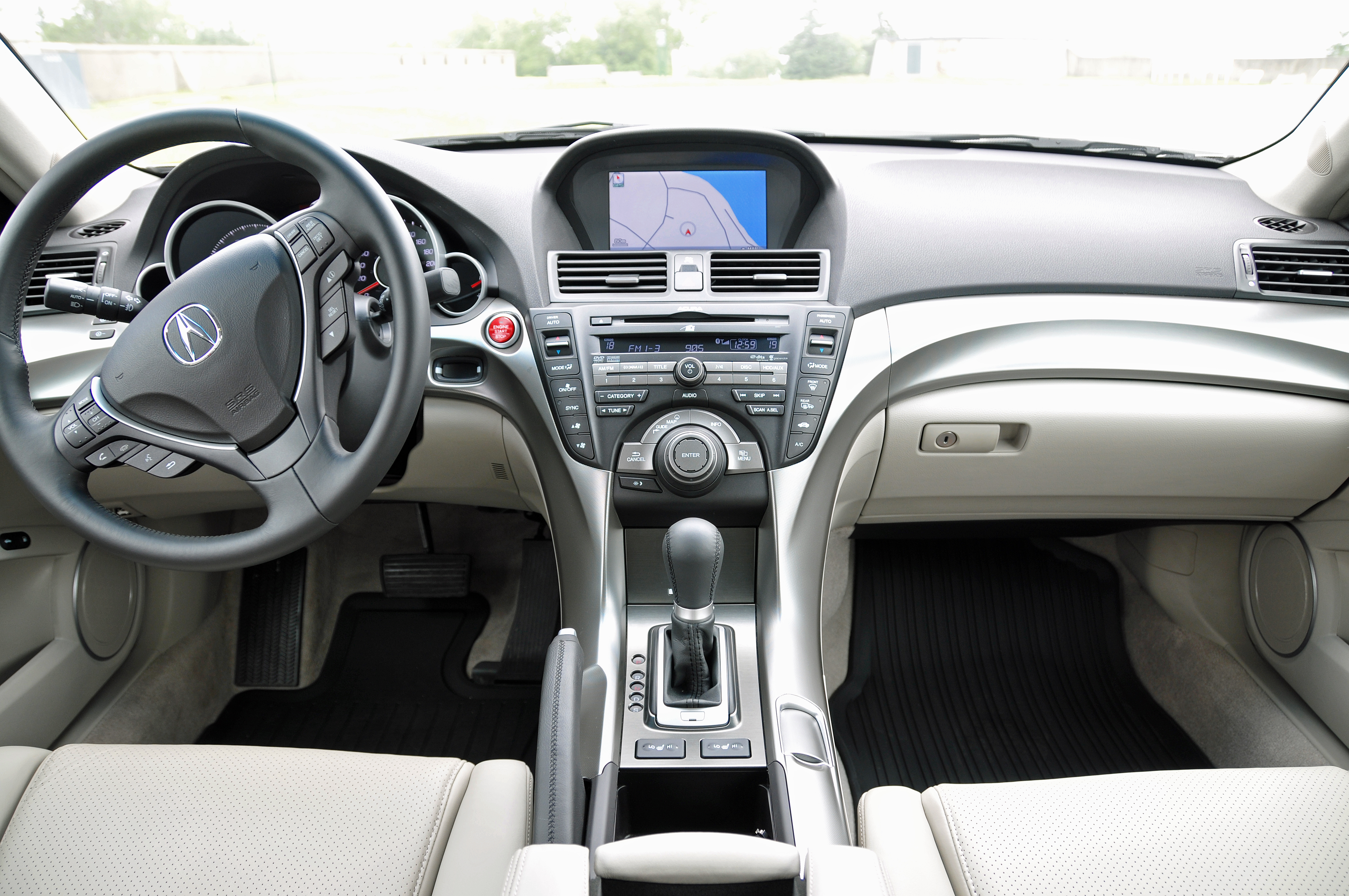
Interior

=== 2010 ===
For the 2010 model year, Acura announced that a 6-speed close-ratio manual transmission would be available for the SH-AWD model. For this manual transmission model, Acura designed a new self-adjusting dual-mass clutch system for increased holding power and improved modulation compared to the previous generation. Additional differences from the automatic transmission SH-AWD model include more aggressively tuned front dampers and springs, stiffer engine and transmission mounts, unique Electric Power Steering (EPS) tuning, hill start assist, and improved front/rear weight distribution.

The 2010 model adds further electronic convenience items, including a central multifunction display, an eight-speaker 276-watt audio system with a six-disc CD changer, XM Satellite Radio, USB port connectivity (including full iPod control support), and Bluetooth Audio (for streaming music from a cell phone). Both models offer an optional Technology Package, which includes premium Milano leather seats; Keyless Access ( unlock the doors, and start the engine without ever having to use your key, as long as it is in your pocket or purse, or within range of the vehicle.), a joystick-based (no longer touchscreen) navigation system updated with a new 8-inch (200 mm) full VGA display and the ability to provide weather information and traffic-based rerouting, and the Acura/ELS audio system with 10 speakers, 440 watts of power, DTS CD compatibility for 5.1 surround sound, DVD-A, as well as an internal hard drive with 13 GB of storage dedicated for audio. With the ELS audio system, audio CDs are automatically ripped to the hard drive upon insertion for future playback. The navigation system also stores its map data on the hard drive (as opposed to the previous model's DVD-based storage), producing faster boot times.

=== Technology package ===
==== Audio ====
===== Hard drive =====
- 13GB
- Only the contents of an Audio CD may be ripped to the HDD. Copying to the HDD from other recordable media or storage devices is not supported.
- Album, Title and Artist information is provided by an updatable Gracenote file.

===== USB =====
- FAT32 Format Supported
- Limited to 700 folders existing at the root of the storage device. Folder names appear as album names. Sub-folder navigation is not supported.
- Limited to 15,000 files

=== 2012 ===
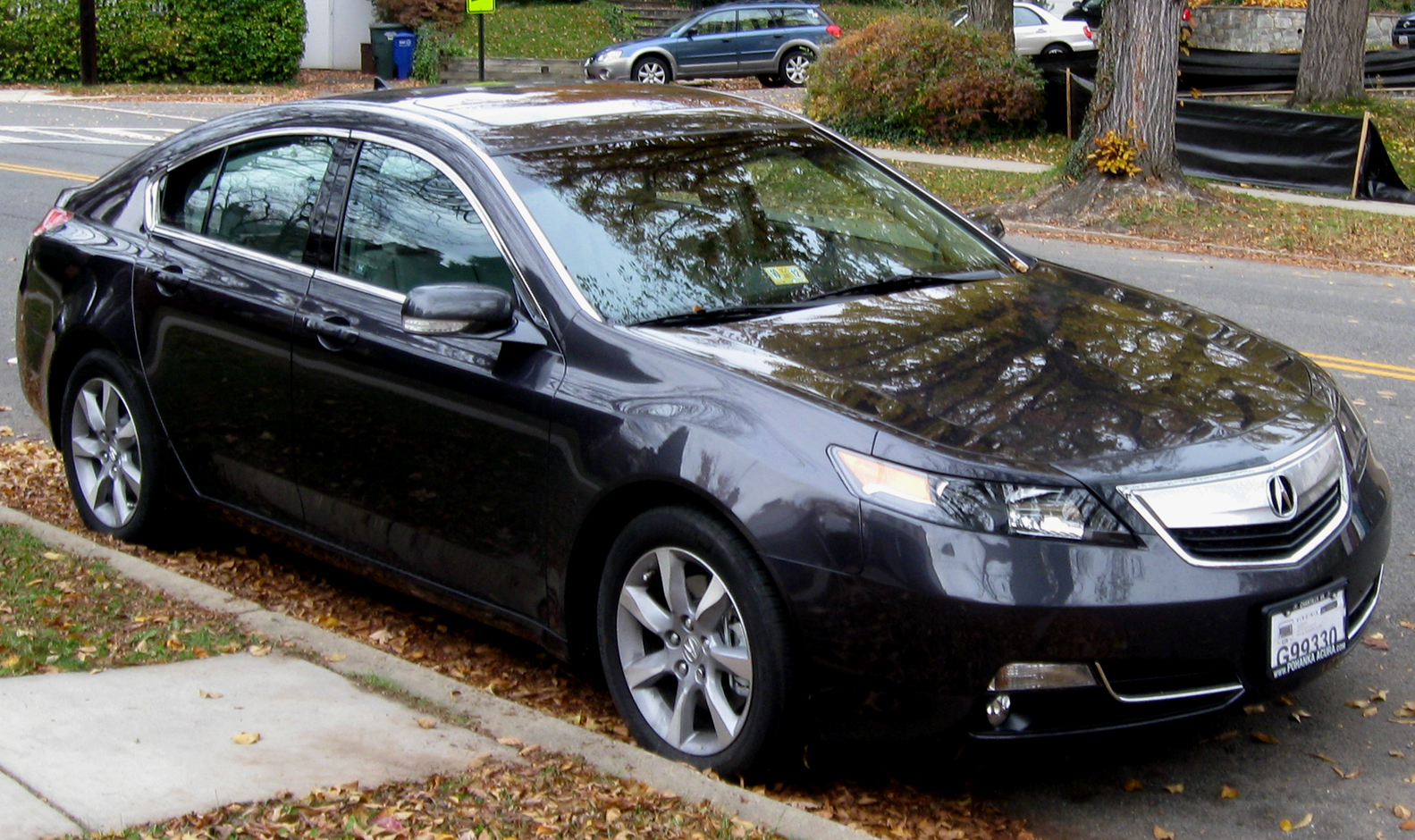
2012–2014 Acura TL (US; facelift)

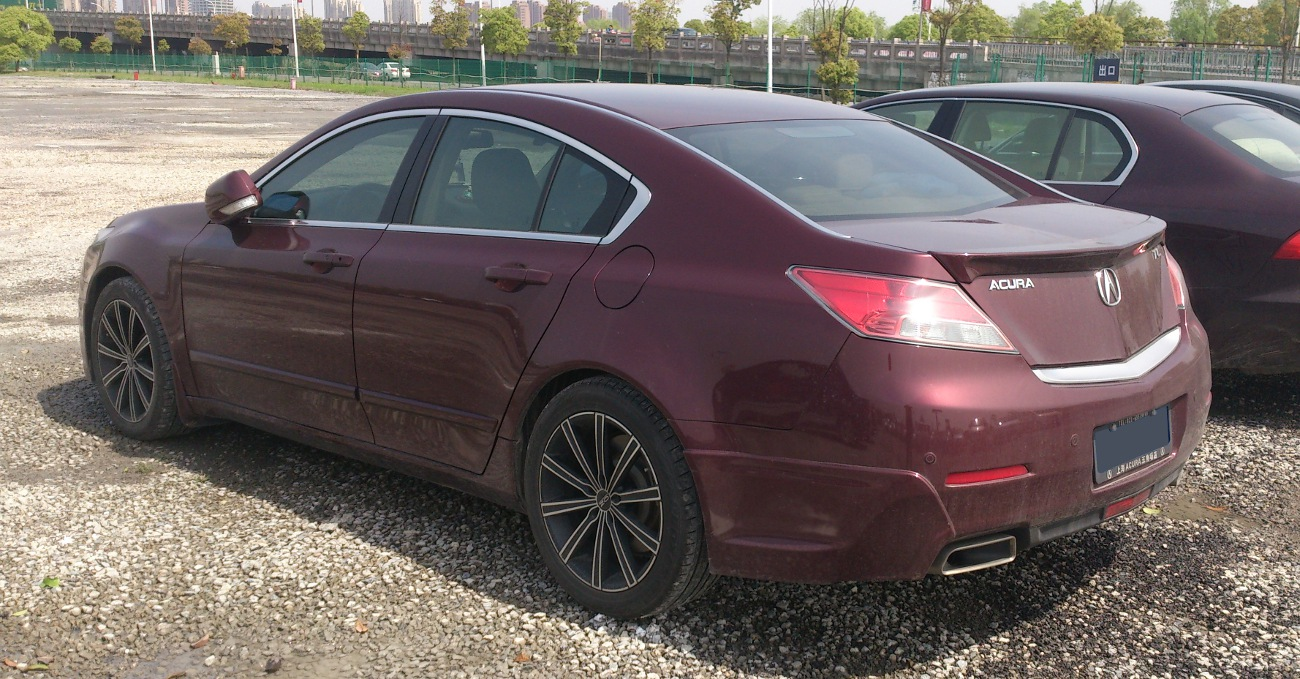
Acura TL (China; facelift)

For the 2012 model, Honda offered new front and rear styling, updating the controversial "beak" insert in the front grille by replacing it with a smaller insert that flows better with the headlights and creates a sleeker profile. Aside from cosmetic changes, the 2012 TL was equipped with Honda's 6-speed automatic transmission to improve performance and efficiency. This transmission features downshift rev-matching with throttle blip and the ability to downshift two gears at a time. Additional new features include ventilated seats, new 60GB HDD, blind-spot information system, and upgraded wheels. The 2012 TL retains both the base 3.5L 280 hp (209 kW) 254 lb⋅ft (344 N⋅m) and the SH-AWD models' 3.7L 305 hp (227 kW) 273 lb⋅ft (370 N⋅m) engines but received two mpg more in the city (20 mpg_{‑US}, 12 L/100 km, 24 mpg_{‑imp}) and three mpg more on the highway (29 mpg_{‑US}, 8.1 L/100 km, 35 mpg_{‑imp}), thanks to less engine friction and the 6-speed automatic transmission. The 6-speed manual transmission will continue to be offered. The 2012 model is also 3dB quieter on the highway.

=== 2013 Acura TL Special Edition ===
It is a version of front-wheel-drive 2013 Acura TL with distinctive 10-spoke 18-inch alloy wheels, a color-matched deck lid spoiler, trunk-mounted Special Edition badging, Keyless Access System with Keyless Access Remote, pushbutton start, choice of 4 body colors (Bellanova White Pearl, Crystal Black Pearl, Graphite Luster Metallic and Silver Moon Metallic) matched with an Ebony interior leather upholstery with contrast stitching, Sequential SportShift 6-speed automatic transmission with paddle shifter system, 10-way adjustable power driver's seat, an 8-way adjustable power front passenger's seat, power moonroof, 276-watt audio system with eight speakers, dual-zone dual-mode automatic climate control system with automatic humidity control. The vehicle was produced using domestically and globally sourced parts at Honda of America Mfg., Inc., in Marysville, Ohio.

=== Safety ===
The Acura TL uses Honda's Advanced Compatibility Engineering front end. The Insurance Institute for Highway Safety (IIHS) found the 2009-11 front-wheel drive TL models (SH-AWD models not included in study) to have an overall driver death of five deaths per million registered years.

IIHS testing:
| Moderate overlap frontal offset | Good |
| Small overlap frontal offset | Good^{*} |
| Side impact | Good |
| Roof strength (2012–14) | Good |

^{*} vehicle structure rated "Acceptable"

=== Production ===
In early 2014, Honda announced it would be replacing the TL with the new Acura TLX sedan. Production of the TL ceased in March 2014, with the 2015 TLX going on sale later in the year.

== Sales figures ==
| Calendar year | US sales |
|---|---|
| 1995 | 16,539 |
| 1996 | 24,700 |
| 1997 | 23,151 |
| 1998 | 31,883 |
| 1999 | 56,566 |
| 2000 | 67,033 |
| 2001 | 69,484 |
| 2002 | 60,764 |
| 2003 | 56,770 |
| 2004 | 77,895 |
| 2005 | 78,218 |
| 2006 | 71,348 |
| 2007 | 58,545 |
| 2008 | 46,766 |
| 2009 | 33,620 |
| 2010 | 34,049 |
| 2011 | 31,237 |
| 2012 | 33,572 |
| 2013 | 24,318 |
| 2014 | 10,616 |
| 2015 | 88 |
