= Jon Ikeda =

American automobile designer and executive

- Born: July 31, 1965 (age 61); Tokyo, Japan
- Education: Art Center College of Design
- Occupations: Senior Vice President, Honda Racing Corporation USA
- Known for: Design of Acura TL (UA6/UA7)

Jon Ikeda (born July 31, 1965) is an American automobile designer and executive. He currently serves as senior vice president of Honda Racing Corporation USA. He previously served as vice president and brand officer of Acura.

== Early life and education ==
Ikeda, a Japanese American born in Tokyo, immigrated to the United States in 1978, and grew up in Glendale and Pasadena, California. In 1989, he graduated from the Art Center College of Design in Pasadena, with a Bachelor of Science in industrial design.

== Career ==
In fall 1989, Ikeda was hired by Honda, working at the automaker's advanced design studio in Tokyo. While in Japan, he contributed to the design of the award-winning 1991 Honda FS-X concept, as well as the first generation Acura RL.

In 1995, he was relocated to Honda R&D Americas. Upon returning to the United States, he was named design project leader of the 2001 Honda Civic coupe, and was lead designer of the 2004 Acura TL, the best-selling Acura model of all time. In his role as chief designer and division director, Ikeda was instrumental in the construction of the Acura Design Studio in 2007.

In July 2015, Ikeda was promoted to vice president and general manager of Acura. In his new role, he was credited with reinvigorating the Acura brand with a renewed focus on design.

On April 1, 2019, he was named brand officer of Acura.

In April 2024, he was named senior vice president of Honda Racing Corporation USA.
