= Electro Gyrocator =

1981 Honda automotive navigation system

Electro Gyro-Cator
- Map Based Navigation System
- Manufacturer: Honda
- Type: Gas Gyroscope Navigation
- Lifespan: August 24th, 1981 – 1982
- Media: Map: 0.1 t lumirror film permeable offset printed sheet / Sheet size: A5 /Basic scale: 1/250,000
- Operating system: 16 bit computer microprocessor (8 bit external bus) ROM 10 KB, SRAM 1 KB, DRAM 16 KB
- Display: Effective display screen size: 80 mm x 100 mm / Route display length: 80 mm max. / Effective scale range: 1/7,000 to 1/400,000
- Power: Driving distance sensor: 8-pole magnet rotation, Hall IC pickup / Direction sensor: gas-rate gyrosensor (helium gas) / Detection range: -70 deg/sec to +70 deg/sec

Internal workings of the Gas Gyroscope

The Electro Gyro-Cator was claimed to be the world's first automated commercially available automotive navigation system. It was co-developed by Honda, Alpine, and Stanley Electric Co..

Unlike most navigation systems of today, it did not use GPS satellites to maintain its position and discern movement of the vehicle. Rather, it was an inertial navigation system, because it contained a helium gas gyroscope that could detect both rotation and acceleration. A special servo gear was also attached to the transmission housing to feed information to the Gyro-Cator to help maintain position, map speed and distance traveled.

Transparent maps were placed inside the unit and it would scroll them past a 6 inch monochrome CRT illuminated screen as the car traveled along. The monitor would indicate by a series of circles (or cross hairs) on the screen to show the vehicle's current location or display lines for path of travel. A marking pen was also included to help make personal indicators on the map if needed. Adjustments could be made to change the display scale, position, rotation, brightness, and contrast. In its only year of production in 1981, it was announced as an option on that year's Honda Accord and Honda Vigor, but at ¥300,000 ($2,746 USD), it was almost a quarter of the value of the car. It is not clear how many units were actually sold to customers as a "dealer option". A patent for gyroscope design was introduced to the US in design patent D274332.

Documented weight for the unit was roughly 20 lb (9 kg). A display unit, with a cutaway of the Gyroscope, is currently shown at the Honda Collection Hall at Twin Ring Motegi, Japan.
