= Makoto Tamamura =

Japanese automotive engineer

Makoto Tamamura (玉村 誠, Tamamura Makoto) is an automobile chassis engineer. While working for Honda Motor Co. Ltd, Tamamura helped to design the Acura NSX and to tune the suspension of the Acura TL A-SPEC.
