= Alpine Electronics =

Japanese manufacturer of consumer electronics

Alpine Electronics, Inc.
- Native name: アルパイン株式会社
- Romanized name: Arupain Kabushiki-gaisha
- Formerly: Alps Motorola Co., Ltd. (1967-1978)
- Type: Subsidiary
- Industry: Consumer electronics
- Founded: 10 May 1967; 59 years ago
- Headquarters: Yukigayaotsukamachi, Shinagawa, Tokyo, Japan
- Key people: Nobuhiko Kogeyama (president and CEO)
- Products: Car audio and automotive navigation systems
- Revenue: ▲265,054 million Yen (2007)
- Number of employees: 10,566 Consolidated
- Parent: Alps Alpine
- Website: alpine.co.jp

Alpine Electronics, Inc. (アルパイン株式会社, Arupain Kabushiki-gaisha) is a Japanese consumer electronics subsidiary of the Japanese electronics component manufacturer Alps Alpine, specialising in car audio and navigation systems.

Established in 1967 as Alps-Motorola – a joint venture between Alps Electric and U.S.-based Motorola – it became Alpine Electronics, Inc. in 1978 when Alps bought out Motorola's share of the company. Alpine's engineering headquarters are in Iwaki, Fukushima Prefecture, Japan. Alpine also has manufacturing facilities in Brazil, Hungary, Mexico, China, and Thailand. In 2006, 76% of Alpine's revenues came from OEM sales. Honda and Volkswagen have offered unbranded audio systems manufactured by Alpine, and companies such as Jaguar, Jeep and Land Rover have offered co-branded Alpine audio systems in their vehicles.

== Products and technologies ==
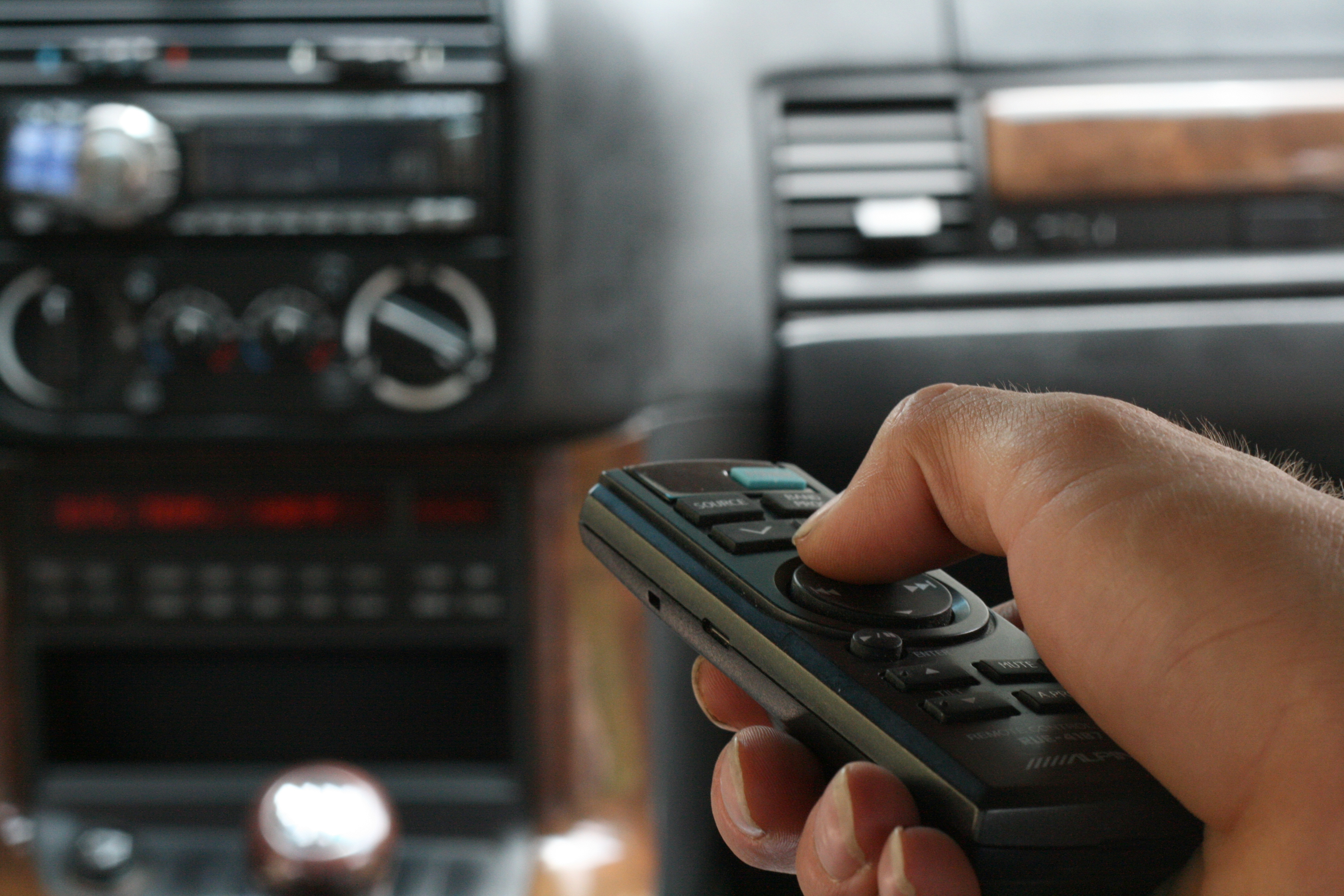
An Alpine car audio remote control

- 1981 – World's first automotive navigation system, created for Honda as the Electro Gyrocator
- 1982 – World's first in-car computerized equalizer
- 1983 – Alpine introduces their first remote control auto security systems
- 1984 – Alpine introduces the Model 9500 Mobile Cellular Telephone
- 1990 – 7909 CD Tuner
- 1991 – 5700 DAT head unit
- 1993 – 7980 world's first in-dash 3-CD changer and tuner
- 1994 – World's first speaker utilising DDDrive Technology
- 1998 – World's smallest CD Auto Changer
- 2001 – World's first swivel in-dash monitor
- 2004 – World's first Dolby Digital EX aftermarket in-car product
- 2004 – Alpine introduced the BioLite display technology in their 2004 receiver lineup
- 2004 – World's first company to manufacture a component which can interact with an iPod
- 2005 – First full Class D MOST bus amplifier for the Volvo XC90
- 2007 – iDA-x001, the first head unit developed in partnership with Apple to utilise the iPod
- 2008 – Imprint sound processor Technology, which allows individual car audio system tuning
- 2008 – IVA-W205R Mobile Media Station, which can house a portable Blackbird Navigation device
- 2009 – Head units with integral bluetooth handsfree capability with an additional module
- 2011 – ICS-X8 world's first MirrorLink enabled Mobile Media Station
- 2017 – ILX-107 world's first in-dash receiver with wireless Apple CarPlay

Other innovations have included the Alpine F#1 Status systems and V12 AccuClass-D power amplifiers.

At the Alpine Museum in Japan there is a model "7307" radio/tape recorder (circa 1981) shot by an American (Roger Holdaway of SpeakerWorks in Orange Ca) using a .45-caliber pistol at a distance of 4 feet (approx. 1.22 meters). The owner, frustrated with the performance of the product, shot the unit and returned it to Alpine. This gesture brought home to Alpine the importance of product quality, and as a result, they spent US$25 million on a testing and evaluation centre in Iwaki-city, Japan.

== iPod devices ==
Alpine was one of the first in the industry to introduce in-vehicle iPod devices to allow users to control iPod playback using the head unit's front panel buttons or remote; view song information (artist, album and/or song name) on the display; and easily search for songs through the receiver's Quick Search interface. Alpine introduced the first aftermarket Interface Adapter for iPod (KCA-420i) in 2004, letting users experience optimized sound quality and control of digital music files in the car. In 2008, Alpine introduced a full line of iPod integration Digital Media Receivers. In 2009, Alpine introduced the first double-din iPod digital media station, the iXA-W404.

== BioLite Display ==
Alpine introduced the BioLite display technology in their 2004 receiver lineup, claiming that it provides "a much wider viewing angle than conventional displays and outstanding visibility, even in harsh daylight."

== Navigation devices ==
Alpine continues to develop in-vehicle navigation aftermarket and OEM devices. In 2004, Alpine introduced the NVE-N872A. The DVD-based NVE-N872A was Alpine's fourth generation satellite-linked navigation system, based on an Alpine in-vehicle navigation platform, which won J.D. Power awards four times in six years. In 2006, Alpine introduced their first portable navigation device, the PMD-B100. In 2008, Alpine introduced the PND-K3, an all-in-one portable navigation plus Bluetooth hands-free system. In 2009, Alpine introduced the PND-K3msn with information like traffic and weather updates.

== Awards ==
The 1986 Buick Grand National, modified by SpeakerWorks in Orange, California, is believed to be the only vehicle ever to retire undefeated from the pro division of the national sound-off circuit. The black Buick won the Alpine Car Audio Nationals II Pro Unlimited (751 watts and up) division in 1988, and IASCA's Pro unlimited title in 1989, 1990, and 1991 before being retired by its owner, Richard Clark. Its sound system is composed of five model 3545 amplifiers and the model 7909 head unit.

== Examples of vehicles equipped from the factory with Alpine equipment ==
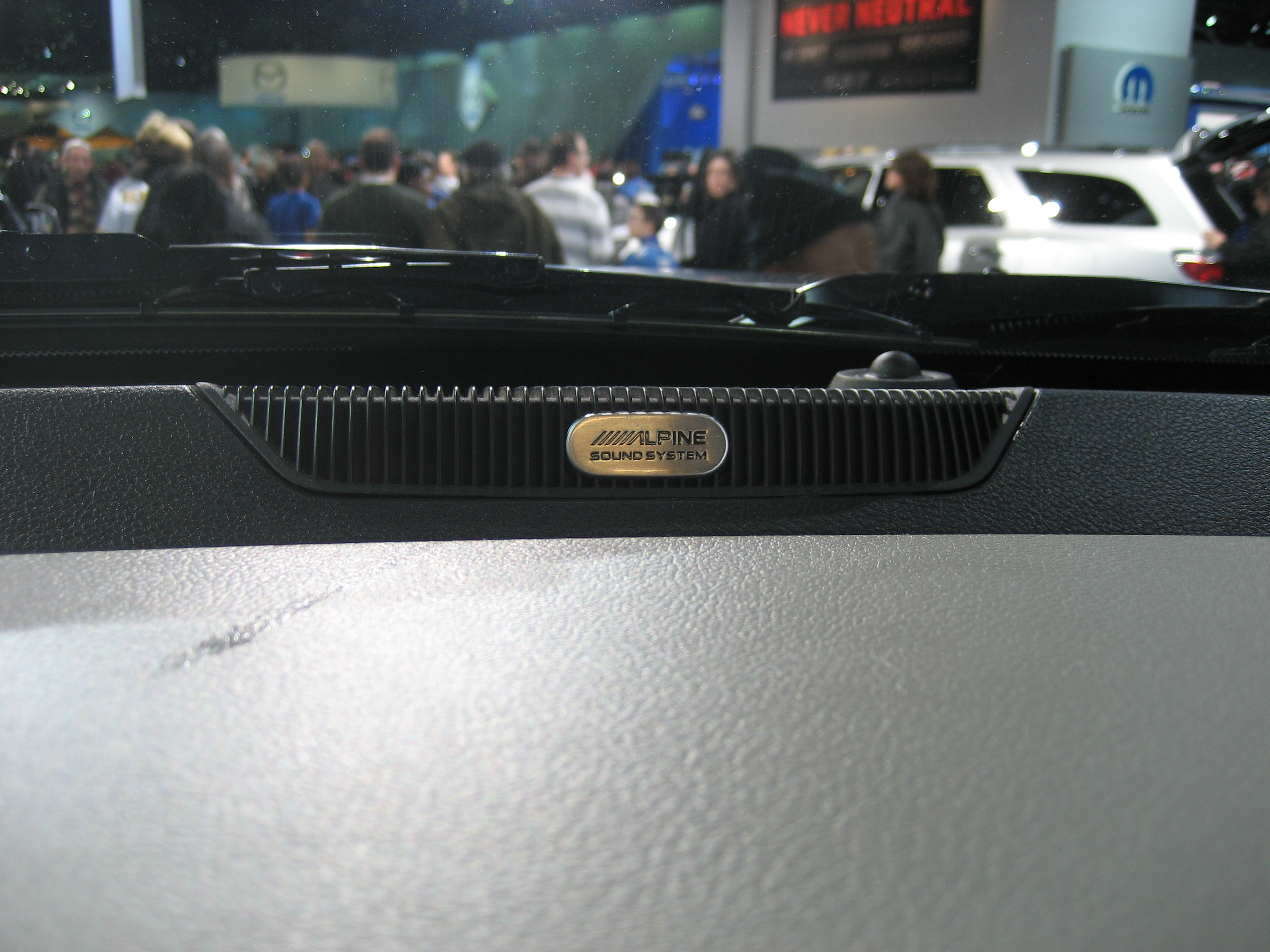
2011 Power Wagon center speaker

- Alfa Romeo 156 Tuner and amplifier module, CD changers (1997–2002)
- Audi A8 (D4) (D4) display, DVD and CD changer
- Jaguar screens, tuner, DVD, amplifiers
- Land Rover tuner, DVD, rear screen entertainment
- Aston Martin amplifier, speakers, rear screen entertainment
- BMW All vehicle lines (CD and DVD changer)
- BMW 5 series (E60) Displays
- BMW 5 series (F10) business navigation and display
- BMW Mini radio and navigation systems
- Chrysler 200 sound system (2015–2017)
- Chrysler 300 sound system (2011– )
- Chrysler Town and Country sound system (2011– )
- Chrysler Pacifica sound system (2017– )
- Dodge Challenger sound system (2011– )
- Dodge Charger sound system (2011– )
- Dodge Dart (PF) sound system (2013–2016)
- Dodge Journey sound system (2011– )
- Dodge Grand Caravan sound system (2011–2017)
- Dodge Ram (1500, 2500, 3500, and Chassis Cabs 3500, 4500, and 5500) sound system (2009– )
- Dodge Viper sound system (2013–2017)
- Fiat 500 sound system (2013– )
- Fiat 500L sound system (2014– )
- Honda Ridgeline DVD navigation system (2006–2014)
- Jeep Grand Cherokee (WK2) sound system (2011– )
- Jeep Cherokee (KL) sound system (2014– )
- Jeep Wrangler (JK) sound system (2013– )
- Lincoln Navigator AM/FM/Cassette (2000-2002)
- Lincoln Town Car tape deck (1998–2002)
- Mercedes S-Class W221 tuner and amplifier module, disk changers
- Mercedes E-Class W211 head units, disk changers
- Mercedes C-Class W203 disk changers
- Mercedes M/R/GL Class head units, navigation systems, disk changers
- Toyota Prius Alpha head units and rear screen entertainment

== Show cars ==
- Between the early 1980s until the end of the 1990s, when the partnership ended; as well as supplying car audio to Lamborghini, Alpine used their top-of-the-range sports model (Countach, later superseded by Diablo) as a mascot car which featured in every product brochure and trade and public shows. The company's UK office, Alpine UK had a yellow Lamborghini Diablo SE30 Jota with the registration L666 LAM (referring to the Diablo name) which was often seen at shows and events.
- The U.S. office, Alpine of America, Inc., onward from 2001, commissioned a series of cars, some with custom airbrush and extensively modified bodywork and interior, which is designed to incorporate as many of its products as possible, the cars usually appear in various shows throughout the country. The cars that were used were:
  - 2001: BMW M3
  - 2002: Acura RSX
  - 2003: Honda Civic
  - 2004: MINI Cooper Unlike previous models, which were closed top, the MINI was more of a speedster, with low rake windscreen.
  - 2005: BMW X5 (E52), was a car that was used previously as a project car, the car's bodywork has a mural of musicians from the last 50 years, they include Ray Charles, Madonna, Jimi Hendrix, Mick Jagger and Bob Marley to create an illusion of how their music will sound with their products.
  - 2006: BMW 645 (aka Sinister 6)
  - 2007: IMPRINT RLS (based on the Mercedes Benz R500)
  - 2008: 25' V-Bottom Alpine Sport Boat trailered by a 2008 Mercedes-Benz GL550
  - 2017: Jeep Wrangler with Smittybilt for SEMA 2017 Alpine and Smittybilt Jeep Wrangler SEMA

== Miscellany ==
- In 1984 Alpine acquired the Luxman brand of high-end home stereo equipment from Japanese Lux Corporation, and tried to merge their Alpine home hi-fi brand with the Luxman brand by co-branding the resulting products as Alpine/Luxman. Because of the differences in the way the products were built (Alpine used mainly standard stainless metals and plastics, Luxman used high-end exotic metals) and product lines from both brands were branded Alpine/Luxman it created brand confusion in their markets, and nearly destroyed the credibility of the Luxman brand. The company later sold off the Luxman brand in 1994 to concentrate fully on the car audio business.
- Between 1992 and 1995, Ford Australia offered a premium sound system developed in conjunction with Alpine to their high-end Fairlane and LTD models.
- In the 1995 James Bond film GoldenEye, the Aston Martin DB5 driven by Bond featured an Alpine 7817R CD Tuner which acted as a communication device and doubled as a colour printer/fax.
- In the past, Alpine sponsored a driver from the Andretti Green racing team in the IndyCar Series. After sponsoring Dario Franchitti in 2005 and Marco Andretti in 2006, they sponsored Tony Kanaan in 2007 and 2008.

== Sponsorship ==
Between 2001 and 2003, Alpine was the main kit sponsor of Spanish La Liga club Deportivo Alavés.
