= Honda Rafaga =

Honda Rafaga series CE 4/5
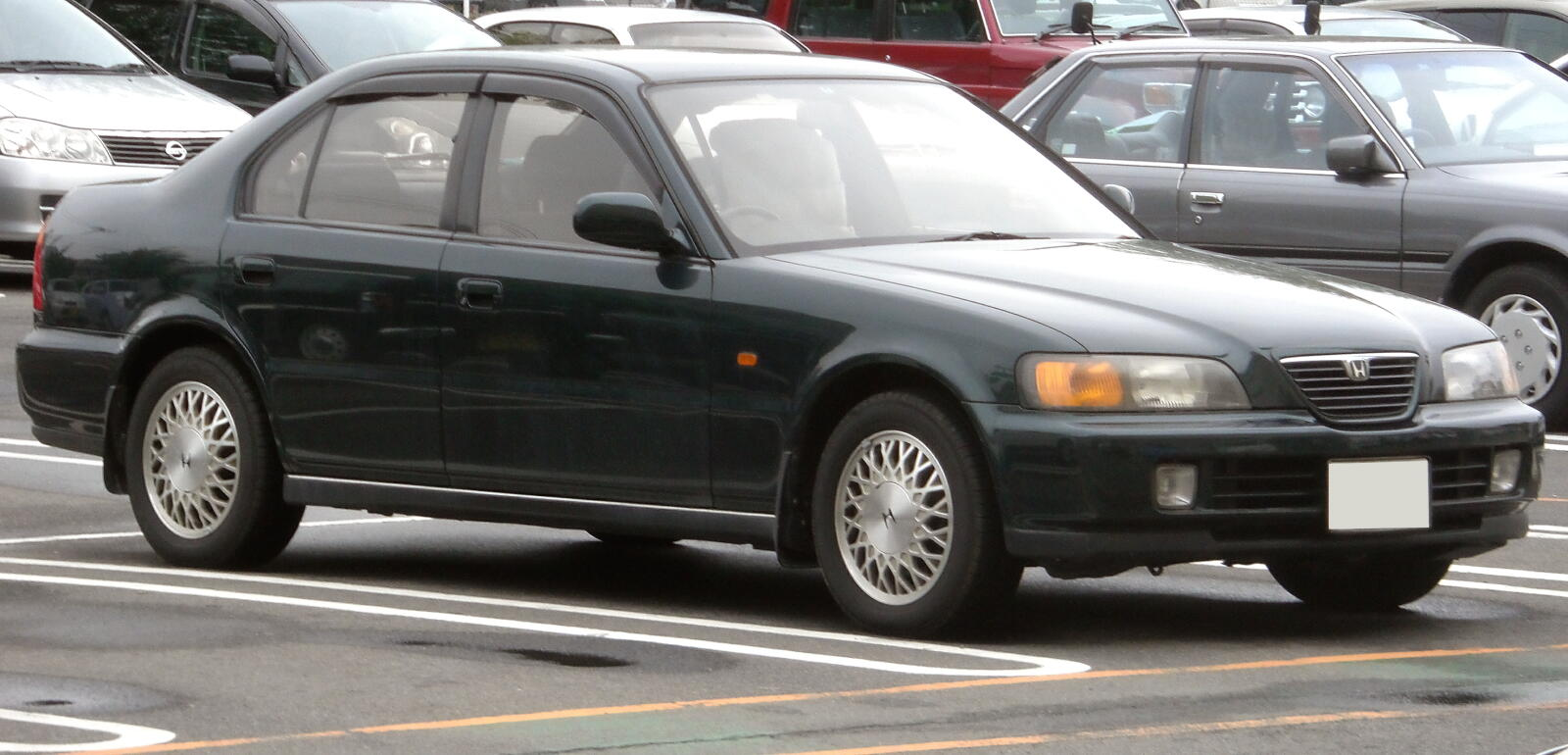

Overview
- Manufacturer: Honda
- Production: October 14, 1993–1997
- Assembly: Japan: Sayama, Saitama

Body and chassis
- Class: Compact car
- Body style: 4-door sedan
- Layout: Front-engine, front-wheel-drive
- Related: Honda Ascot CE series

Powertrain
- Engine: 2.5 L G25A Straight-5; 2.0 L G20A-5 Straight-5
- Transmission: 4-speed automatic 5-speed manual

Dimensions
- Wheelbase: 2,770 mm (109.1 in)
- Length: 4,555 mm (179.3 in)
- Width: 1,695 mm (66.7 in)
- Height: 1,425 mm (56.1 in)
- Curb weight: 1,280 kg (2,821.9 lb) (G20A engine); 1,380 kg (3,042.4 lb) (G25A engine)

Chronology
- Successor: Honda Torneo

The Honda Rafaga is a compact 4-door sedan sold exclusively in Japan by Honda, introduced in October 1993, and using the same 5-cylinder engine used in the Honda Inspire and the Honda Vigor, it shared a platform with the second generation CE series Honda Ascot. "Rafaga" is Spanish for "gust" or "blustery". The engine is installed longitudinally, the same configuration used in the Vigor and Inspire. The Rafaga was third in Honda's hierarchy of sedans, and a sister car to the Ascot, which was sold at the Honda Primo dealership network. The Rafaga was sold in Japan at Honda Verno dealerships, and was one level up from the Honda Integra. As with other Honda products, the Rafaga used double wishbone suspension at the front and rear wheels. The "2.5 S" trim level came with a front suspension upper strut brace in the engine compartment. In Japan, the smaller G20A engine used regular grade fuel, while the larger G25A engine used premium grade fuel.

The Rafaga and the Ascot were introduced to serve as Honda's compact sedan for the Japanese market when the Accord's dimensions grew as a result of demand for the Accord in North America needing a wider car. The wheelbase of the Rafaga was shorter than the slightly longer Inspire and Vigor, which measured at 2,805 mm (110.4 in), a difference of 35 mm (1.4 in), which didn't leave much room for rear seat passengers. Furthermore, due to the lengthwise installation of the five-cylinder engine, and the requirement that the overall length of the car comply with Japanese government regulations concerning cars classified as "compact", compromises were made with regard to rear passenger accommodations, and sales suffered as a result.

The grille is in the shape of an inverted triangle that flows into the front bumper, and a small Honda "H" logo at the top. The Rafaga also had a long and low front engine compartment due to the placement of the engine, and a short trunk, adding to its aerodynamic ambitions. Under Japanese Government exterior dimension regulations, the Rafaga was a compact sedan, thereby supplanting the previous Honda Accord, which grew in exterior dimensions slightly. This approach thereby redirected compact sedan buyers to Honda Verno and Honda Primo locations.

The interior came with genuine wood panels provided by Japanese furniture maker Tendo Mokko on the dashboard and center console, with leather available as an option on the "2.5 S". In 1994, dual airbags for front passengers and ABS were available, as well as a glass moonroof. The availability of two engine sizes offered Japanese buyers the choice of deciding how much annual road tax they were willing to pay; the larger 2.5 litre engine offered much higher levels of standard equipment to justify the higher tax liability.

As the recession began to take hold in Japan, known as the "bubble economy", and demand for the Accord remained strong, the Rafaga and the Ascot were discontinued and replaced with the Honda Torneo in 1997.
