= Honda Inspire =

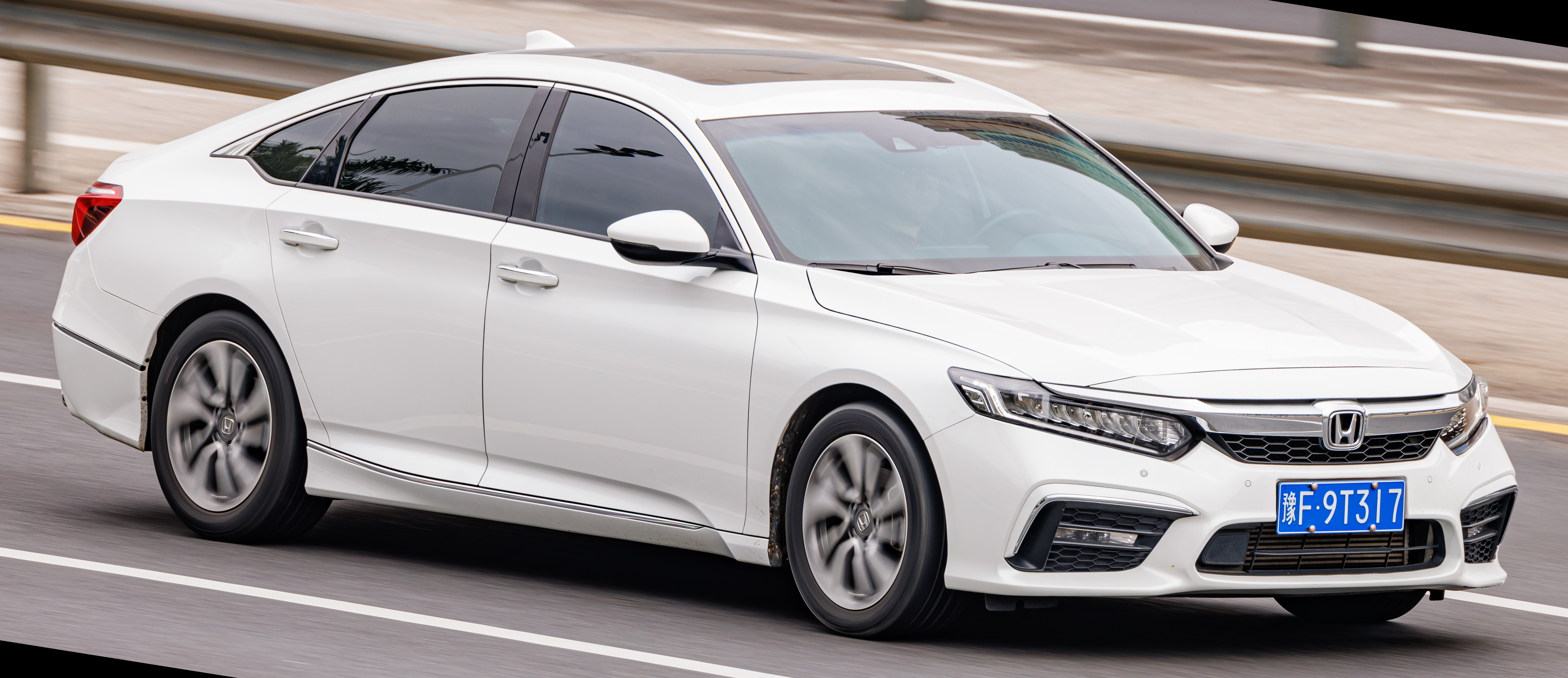
- Sixth-generation Honda Inspire (China)

Overview
- Manufacturer: Honda
- Also called: Honda Vigor (1989–1995); Honda Saber (1995–2003); Acura TL (1995–2002); Honda Accord (2003–2012, 2018–present)
- Production: 1989–2012; 2018–present (China)
- Assembly: Japan: Sayama, Saitama (Sayama Plant, 1989–2012); United States: Marysville, Ohio (Marysville Auto Plant, 1995–2012); China: Wuhan (Dongfeng Honda, 2018–present)

Body and chassis
- Class: Mid-size car
- Body style: 4-door sedan
- Layout: Front-engine, front-wheel-drive

The Honda Inspire (Japanese: ホンダ・インスパイア, Hepburn: Honda Insupaia) is a mid-size sedan derived from the Honda Accord chassis. The first Inspire debuted in late 1989 as the Accord Inspire, a sister nameplate to the Honda Vigor. It was sold at different retail channels in Japan, known as Honda Verno for the Vigor/Saber, and as the Inspire at Honda Clio stores.

== Nameplate history ==
In 1995, the Inspire was updated and exported to the US as the Acura 3.2 TL, while the Vigor nameplate was replaced with the Honda Saber. The longitudinal 2.5L straight-five engine layout and platform remained and was sold as the Acura 2.5 TL.

In 1999, these cars were replaced by the second generation TL that was based on the US-spec Accord platform, and largely designed and engineered in the US by Honda R&D Americas, Inc. in Raymond, Ohio. Manufactured in the US, these were imported into Japan as the new Inspire and Saber.

In June 2003, the fourth-generation Inspire was introduced in Japan derived from the North American Honda Accord V6. This Inspire marks the first time Honda introduced their Variable Cylinder Management technology. In October 2005, the fourth-generation Inspire received a mild restyle, with new headlights, new tail lights, revised interior and new colors. The Inspire targeted the Nissan Teana, the Toyota Mark X and numerous other entry level luxury cars from Japan.

In October 2007, the fifth-generation Inspire was previewed at the Tokyo Motor Show. It is essentially a rebadged 2008 North American market Accord with minor exterior and interior modifications.

In September 2012, after six generations and 23 years, along with the introduction of the ninth-generation Accord, the Inspire ended production for a six-year period. It was then relaunched in 2018 as a China-only model based on the tenth-generation Accord.

== First generation (CB5, CC2 & CC3; 1989) ==
First generation
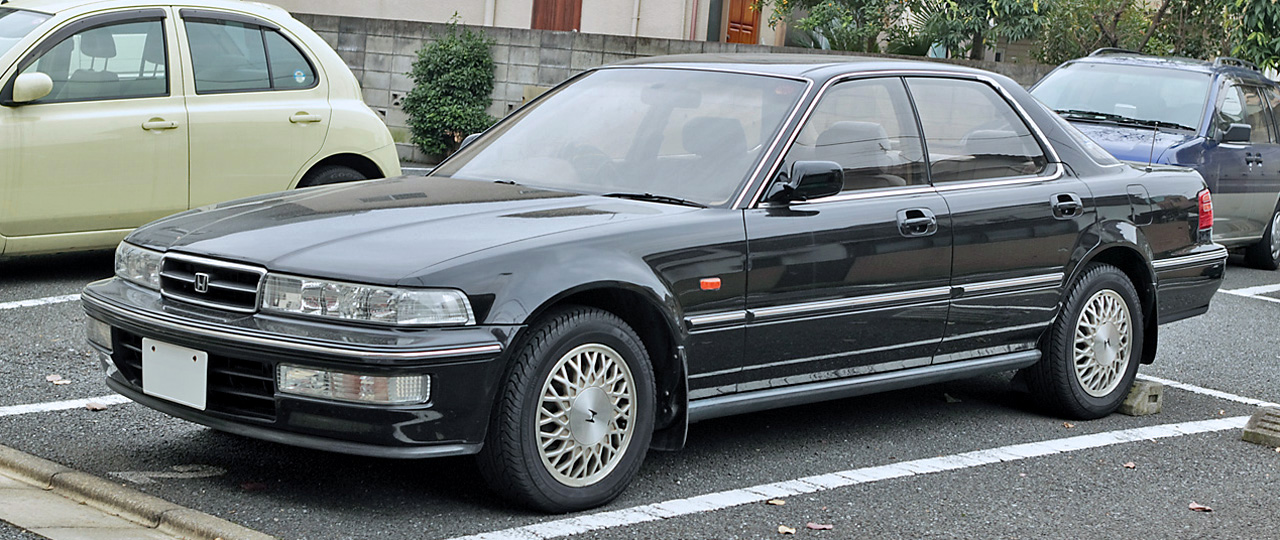

Overview
- Also called: Honda Accord Inspire (CB5); Honda Vigor; Acura Vigor
- Production: 1989–1995

Powertrain
- Engine: 2.0 L G20A1 I5 (CB5/CC3); 2.5 L G25A1 I5 (CC2)
- Transmission: 4-speed automatic 5-speed manual

Dimensions
- Wheelbase: 2,805 mm (110 in)
- Length: 4,690 mm (185 in) (CB5); 4,830 mm (190 in) (CC2/CC3)
- Width: 1,695 mm (67 in) (CB5); 1,775 mm (70 in) (CC2/CC3)
- Height: 1,355 mm (53 in) (G20 engine); 1,375 mm (54 in) (G25 engine)
- Curb weight: 1,270 kg (2,800 lb) (G20 engine); 1,440 kg (3,170 lb) (G25 engine)

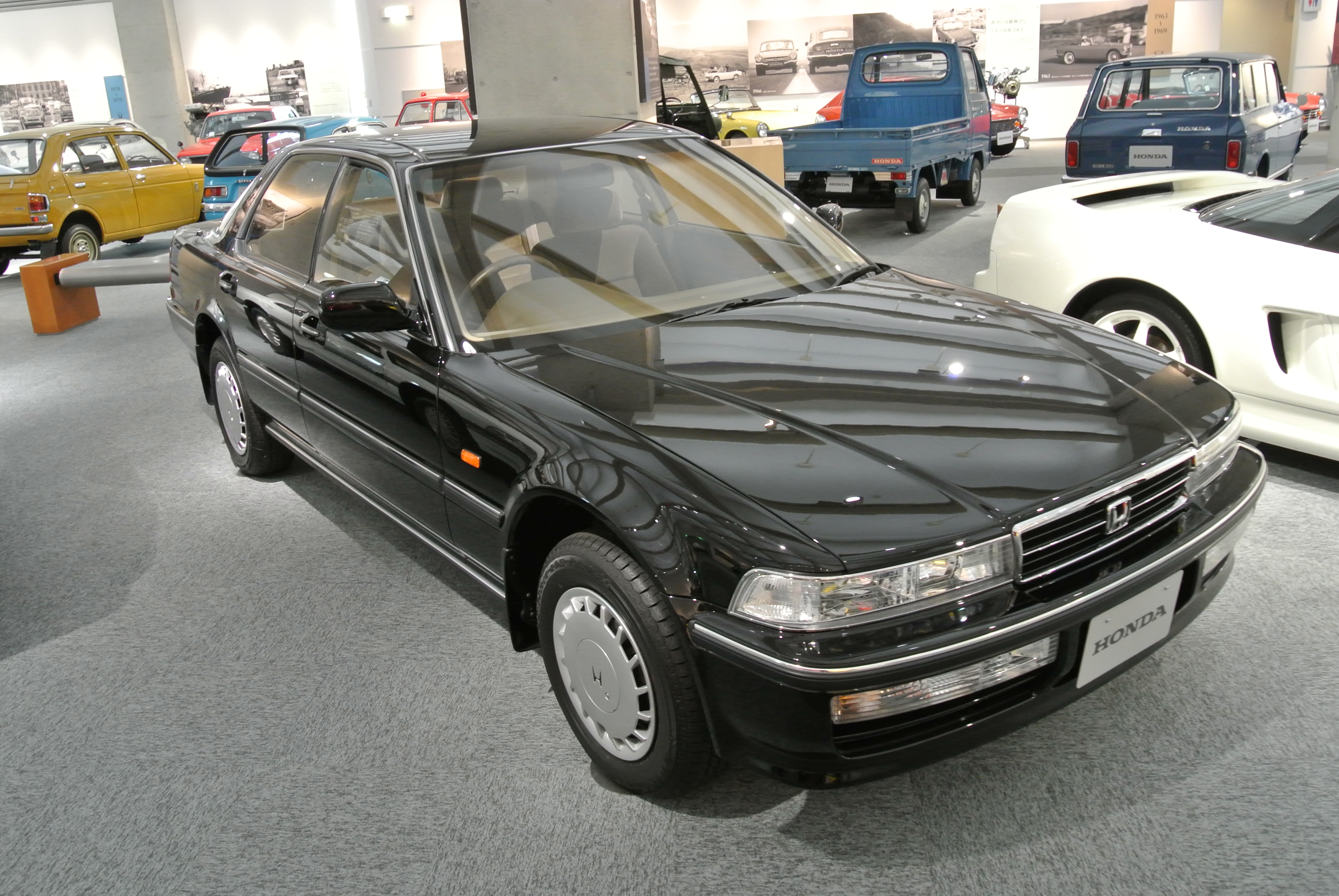
Honda Accord Inspire (CB5), narrower and shorter than the CC2/CC3 cars

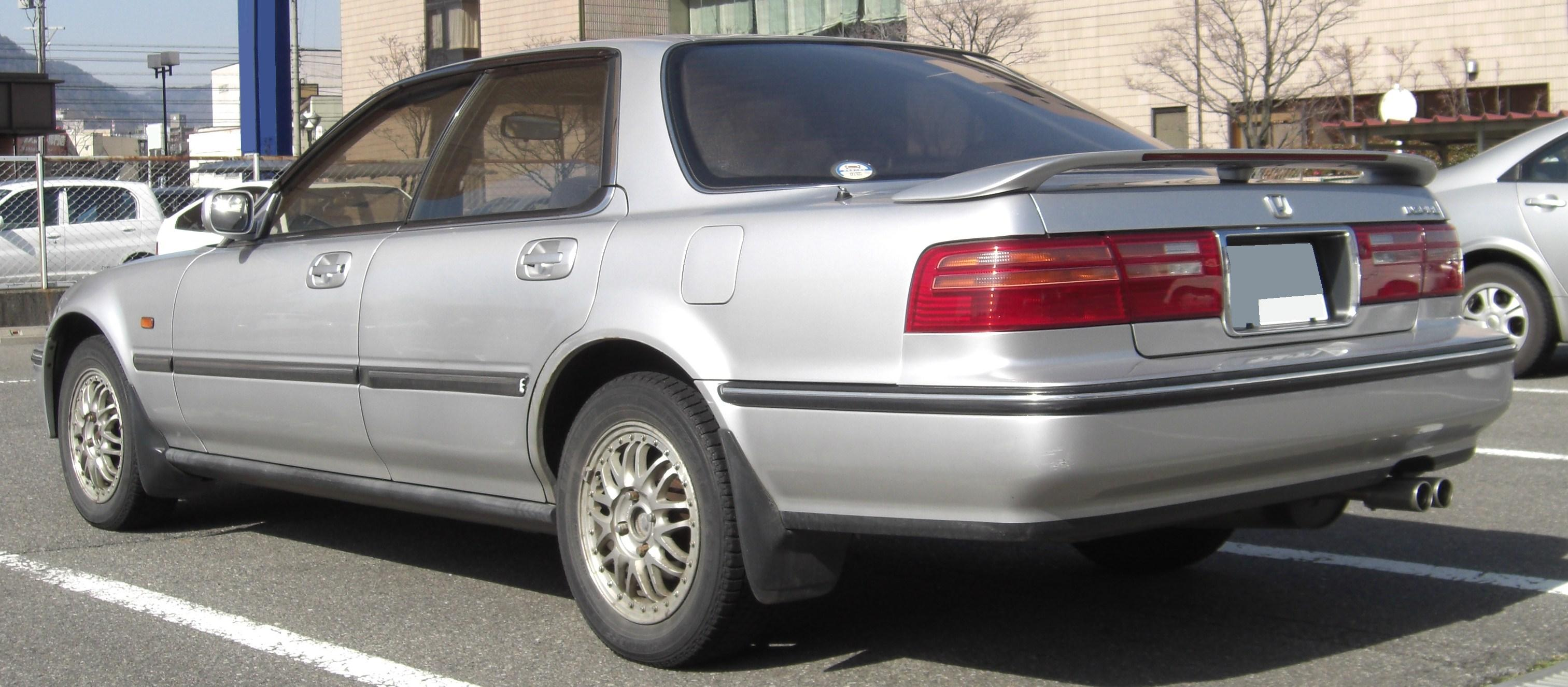
First generation Honda Inspire CC2/CC3

On October 12, 1989, the Honda Accord Inspire was introduced. The platform was shared with the Honda Vigor, a JDM Honda Accord derived five-cylinder luxury sedan available only at Honda Verno dealerships. The Inspire was introduced during the bubble developed in Japan which would burst in the early 1990s (known in Japan as the "bubble economy"). The SOHC four valves per cylinder G20A inline-five engine was all new and was also used in the JDM Honda Rafaga, which was a shorter sedan shared with the second generation Honda Ascot. In Japan, the smaller G20A engine used regular grade fuel, while the larger G25A engine used premium grade fuel.

The body style was a four-door hardtop, but it wasn't a true hardtop, using a "B" pillar between the front and rear passenger compartments, and instead it used frameless doors. The Inspire was available in two versions; a shorter and narrower version badged as the Accord Inspire, with a G20A 2.0-liter engine in compliance with Japanese vehicle size requirements for cars classified as "compact". The CB5 Inspire was offered in three trim levels: the base AZ-i with manual transmission, AG-I with fog lamps and optional sunroof as well as central locking, and the top spec luxury AX-i with leather upholstery, more safety features and full cruise control as well as power seats. A longer and wider version with the G20 (CC3) or with the new G25A 2.5-liter engine (CC2) debuted in early 1992, similar in dimensions to the first generation Legend. The larger CC2 and CC3 Inspire was a mild makeover of the first CB5 Inspire, featuring updated full-width boot lamps (the updated Vigor had conventional single lamp units) with less chrome, larger bumpers with new wrap-around cornering lamp design (instead of the optional separate units like the CB5) and mesh alloy wheels. The new Inspire offered fewer trim levels and the 2-liter inline-five received a minor upgrade, with power creeping up from 160 to 165 PS (118 to 121 kW). The new 2.5 develops 190 PS (140 kW). The CC2/CC3 Inspire shared more features with the Acura Vigor under a 'wide-body' marketing campaign with minor differences. The smaller-bodied Accord Inspire continued to be available alongside the larger CC2/CC3 until the introduction of the second generation Inspire, as it fit a much lower tax category.

The Inspire offered a luxurious approach to the interior as a lower price alternative to the top level Legend, and both vehicles were sold at Honda Clio dealerships. Interior appearance was provided by the Japanese furniture company, Tendo Mokko, offering unique leather interior and a choice of genuine wood inserts for the dashboard and center console.

The transmission is attached behind the engine, with a driveshaft that sends power to the front of the car to an asymmetrically installed limited-slip differential which then supplies power to the front wheels using half shafts; this allowed the powertrain to remain slightly behind the front wheels. This also gave the car a 60:40 front to rear weight distribution. The turning radius of the Inspire also was not as tight as its competitors due to the use of Constant-velocity joint installed on the front axle half shafts, but the Inspire did have an advantage in adverse traction conditions.

== Second generation (UA1–UA3; 1995) ==
Second generation
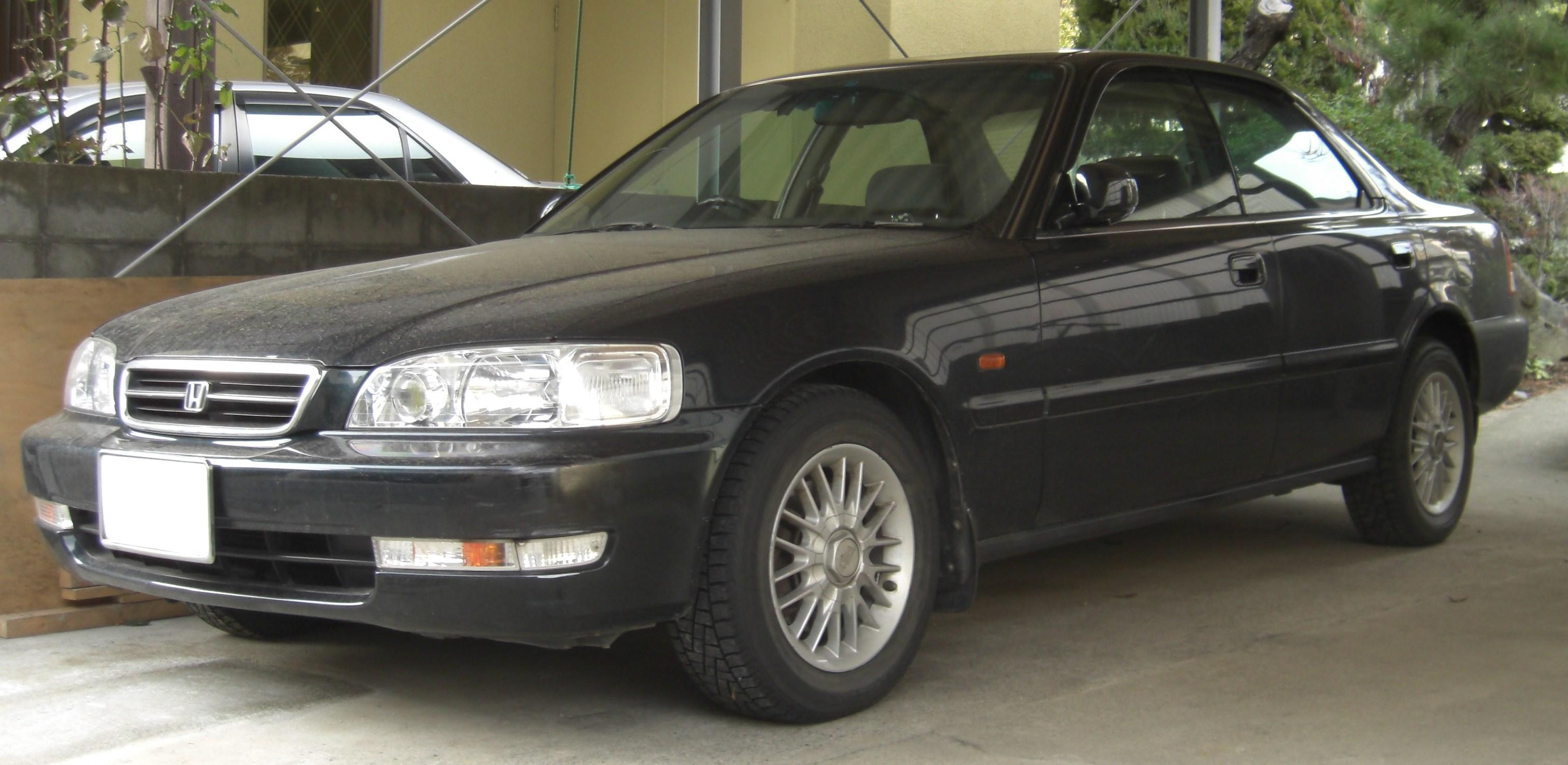

Overview
- Also called: Acura 3.2 TL; Acura 2.5 TL; Honda Saber; Honda Vigor (Thailand & GCC)
- Production: 1995–1998

Powertrain
- Engine: 2.0 L G20A1 I5; 2.5 L G25A1 I5; 3.2 L C32A5 V6
- Transmission: 4-speed automatic

Dimensions
- Wheelbase: 2,840 mm (111.8 in)
- Length: 4,840 mm (190.6 in); 4,870 mm (191.7 in) V6
- Width: 1,785 mm (70.3 in); 1,800 mm (70.9 in) V6
- Height: 1,405 mm (55.3 in); 1,415 mm (55.7 in) V6
- Curb weight: 1,360 kg (3,000 lb); 1,430 kg (3,150 lb) V6

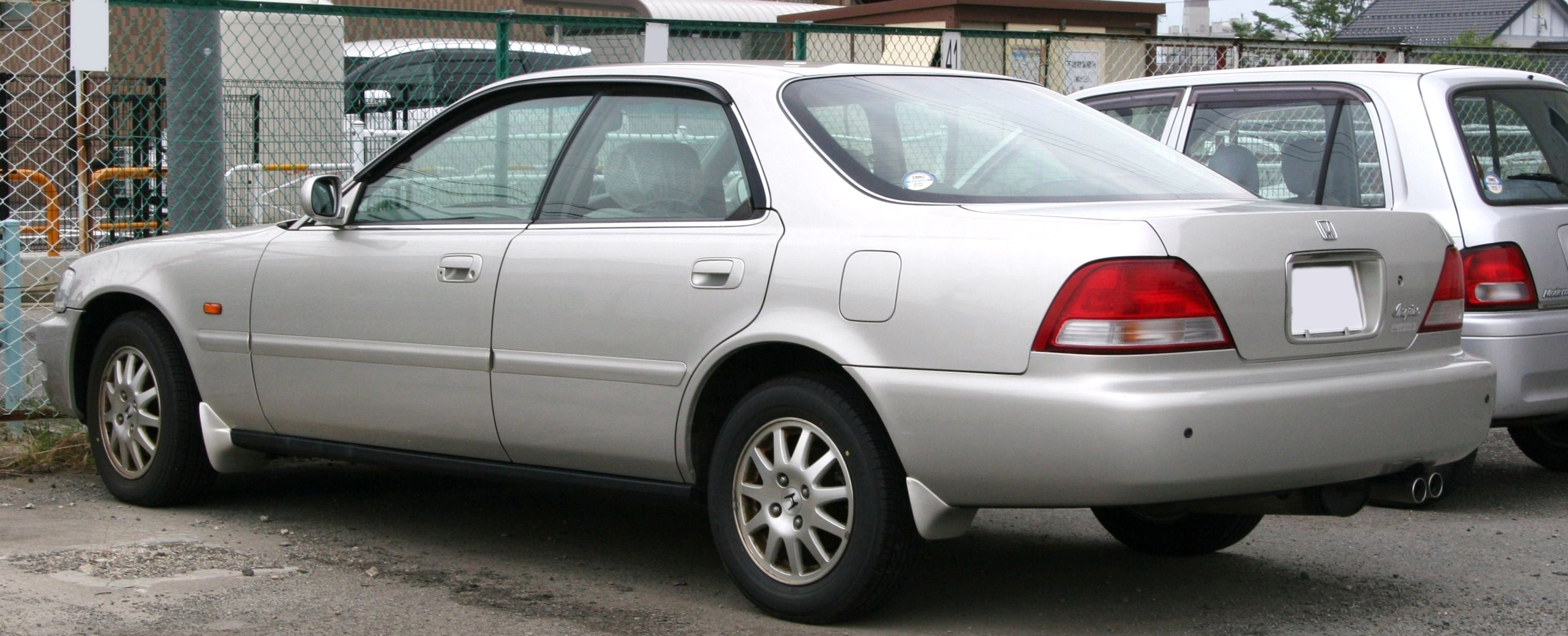
Honda Inspire

The second generation Inspire was almost identical in its dimensions to the first generation 1986 Honda Legend, with that vehicle having been updated and enlarged to better fit the role of flagship for the Honda and Acura brands. The second generation Inspire was available with the Type I 3.2 L V6 offered in the Legend on July 6, 1995, while still offering the straight 5 in both 2.0 L and 2.5 L versions. The profile of this vehicle was reduced somewhat to 1,405 mm (55.3 in). The luxury approach was enhanced. A carryover from the previous generation saw marginal increases in length, width, and height dimensions for vehicles installed with the V6 engine, but the smaller dimensions were not in compliance with Japanese government regulations concerning dimensions and maximum engine displacement, thereby giving buyers an incentive in interior accommodations when purchasing the V6 model. Each engine choice obligated the Japanese buyer with increased annual road tax liability, and one trim level package was designated with the engine choice, offering stepped levels of standard and luxury equipment for each selection.

The Inspire, sold at Honda Clio dealerships, was also known as the (Japanese: Honda Saber) and sold at the Honda Verno sales network, and mechanically identical to the UA1-UA3 Inspire. Starting with this generation, all Inspire and Saber vehicles were manufactured at Honda's Marysville Auto Plant in Ohio, USA.

November 8, 1996 saw the introduction of dual airbags for front seat passengers and anti-lock brakes as standard.

This version of the Inspire competed with the Toyota Camry Gracia, Mark II, Cresta and Chaser, the Nissan Cefiro and Skyline, the Mazda Millenia, and the Mitsubishi Diamante.

== Third generation (UA4 & UA5; 1998) ==
Third generation
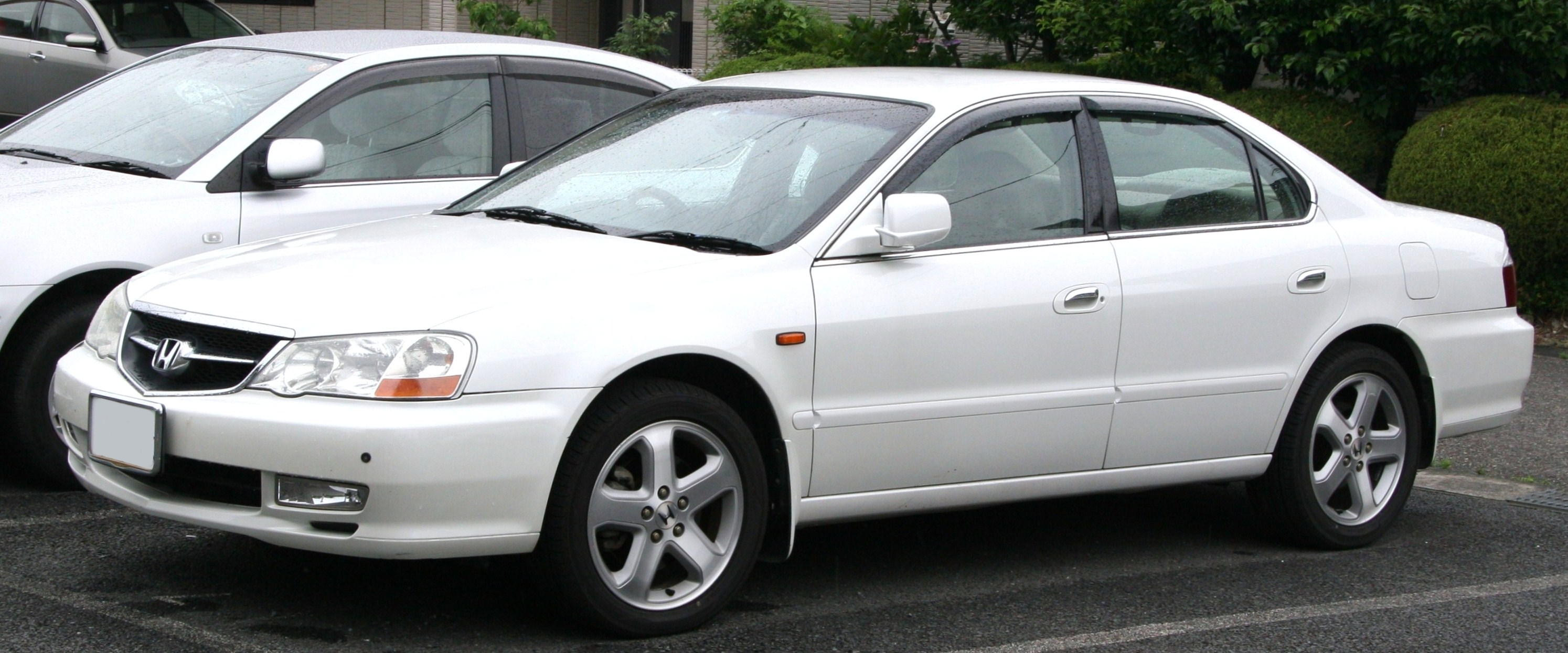

Overview
- Also called: Acura TL; Honda Saber
- Production: 1998–2003

Body and chassis
- Related: US-spec Honda Accord

Powertrain
- Engine: 2.5 L J25A VTEC V6; 3.2 L J32A1 VTEC V6
- Transmission: 5-speed automatic 4-speed automatic

Dimensions
- Wheelbase: 2,745 mm (108.1 in)
- Length: 4,840 mm (190.6 in)
- Width: 1,785 mm (70.3 in)
- Height: 1,420 mm (55.9 in)
- Curb weight: 1,520 kg (3,350 lb)

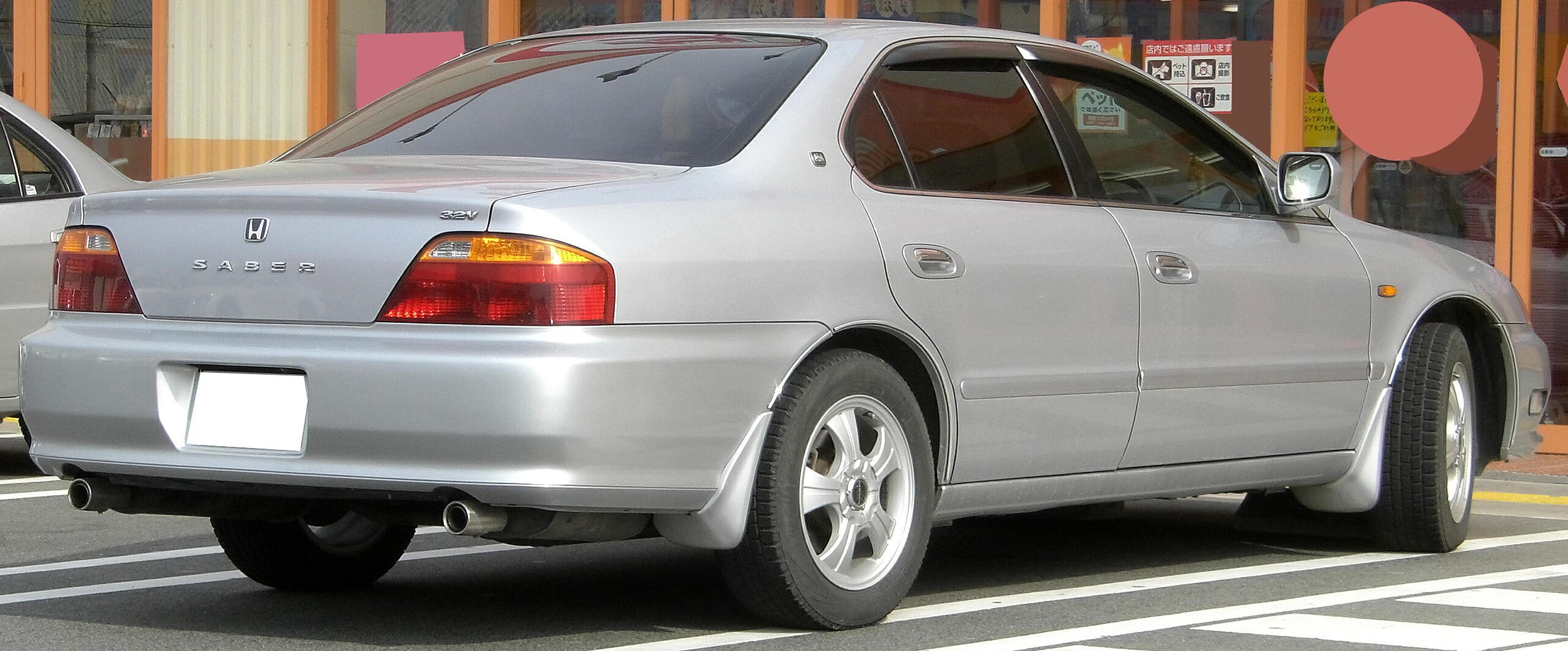
Honda Saber

The third generation Honda Inspire/Saber was introduced October 15, 1998, and was the first Honda designed and built in the US and exported to Japan. In North America, this vehicle was sold as the Acura TL, while in Japan it was the second model that accompanied the flagship Honda Legend at Honda Clio Japanese dealerships. The Saber version of this car was sold as the top level sedan at Honda Verno. Honda's internet-based navigation system Internavi was introduced with this generation.

The Inspire no longer offered the straight-five engine, and instead offered the VTEC-equipped 3.2-litre J32A and 2.5-litre J25A V6 engines, and a choice of a 4- or 5-speed automatic transmission. The bodystyle was changed from hardtop to sedan as a result of the USA-spec Accord having been upgraded to meet USA requirements for improved side impact protection. A cabin air filter, also known as a pollen filter, is introduced with this generation and is located behind the glove compartment for all vehicles sold internationally.

The Honda Saber was discontinued April 2003 along with the consolidation of the Honda Japan sales networks Primo, Clio and Verno.

== Fourth generation (UC1; 2003) ==
Fourth generation
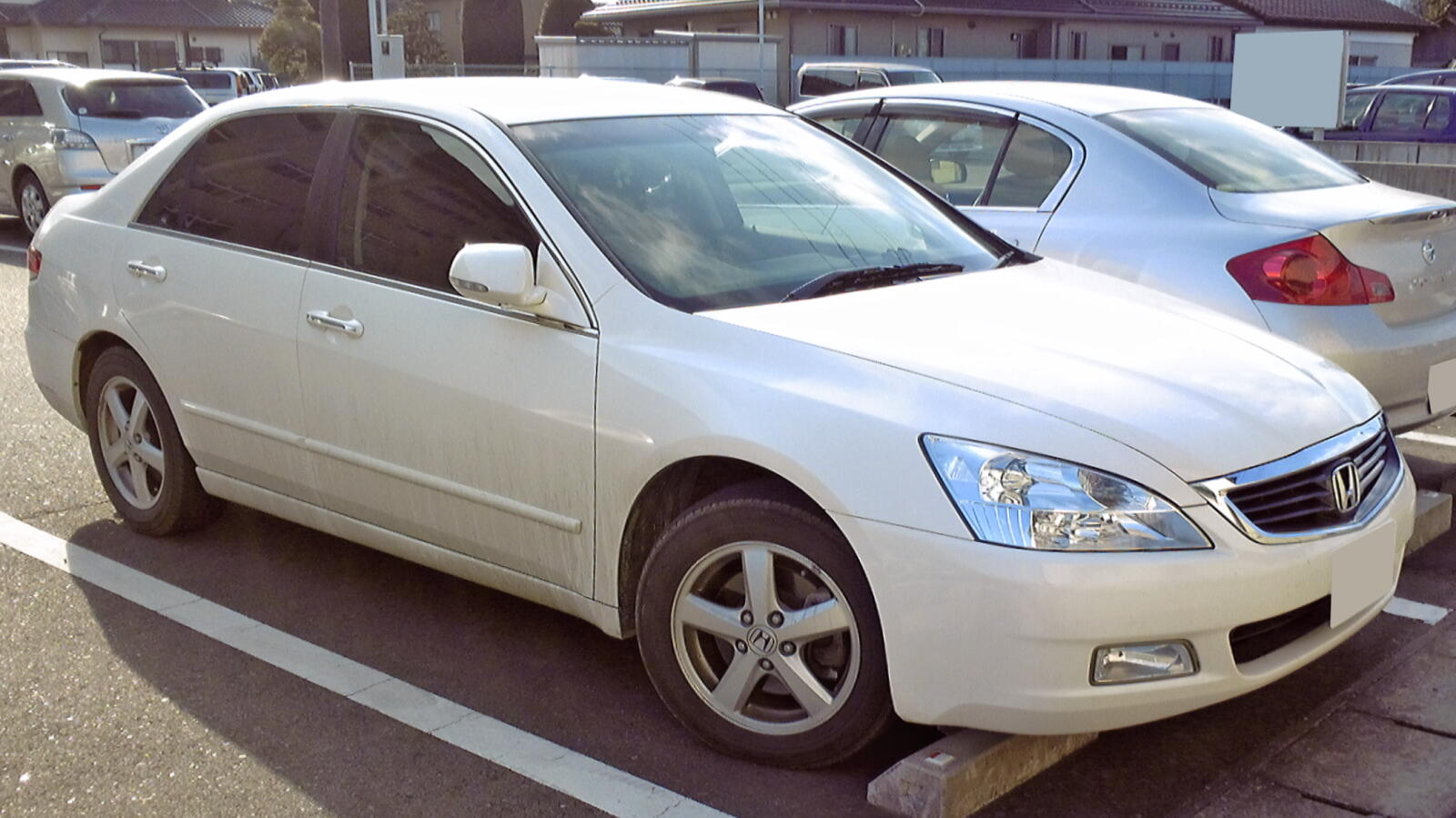
- 2003–2005 Honda Inspire

Overview
- Also called: Honda Accord (US-spec)
- Production: 2003–2007

Body and chassis
- Related: Acura TL

Powertrain
- Engine: 3.0 L J30A5 i-VTEC V6
- Transmission: 5-speed automatic

Dimensions
- Wheelbase: 2,740 mm (107.9 in)
- Length: 4,805 mm (189.2 in)
- Width: 1,820 mm (71.7 in)
- Height: 1,455 mm (57.3 in)
- Curb weight: 1,580 kg (3,480 lb)

The fourth generation Honda Inspire was introduced June 18, 2003. This vehicle was built at the Saitama Prefecture facility in Sayama, Japan. It was built on the same platform as the North American seventh generation Honda Accord. Unlike the North American variant it was based on, the Inspire would only come in the sedan body style, while powertrain was only available with the 3.0 L J30A (marked as J30A-60) V6 with i-VTEC, and a 5-speed automatic transmission + Smatic. It was available in three trims including 30TE, 30TL, and AVANZARE, with the latter being the highest trim. A 30TE limited trim would be available for the 2005 model year.

Styling would be consistent between the Inspire and Accord it was based upon. Notable differences would include standard fog lights on all trims, a redesigned grille, and a new light on the trunk lid. The headlights are different as well featuring High-intensity discharge lamp bulbs for the low beams. A new styling was introduced November 4, 2005, changing both the front grille and rear tail lights, in which LED lighting would be implemented.

This was the first vehicle to showcase Honda's Variable Cylinder Management (VCM) technology. Another technology introduced on the Inspire was Honda's Collision Mitigation Brake System (CMBS, originally introduced as CMS). Honda also made available its Intelligent Highway Cruise Control (IHCC), "C-MOS", which utilized a front-mounted camera to assist in unwanted lane drifting. Honda Intelligent Driver Support (HIDS). An Internet-based navigation service called Internavi is available for drivers in Japan. A notable change would be the change to Electric power-steering (EPS). This was in effort to reduce power demands on the engine, thereby improving fuel economy.

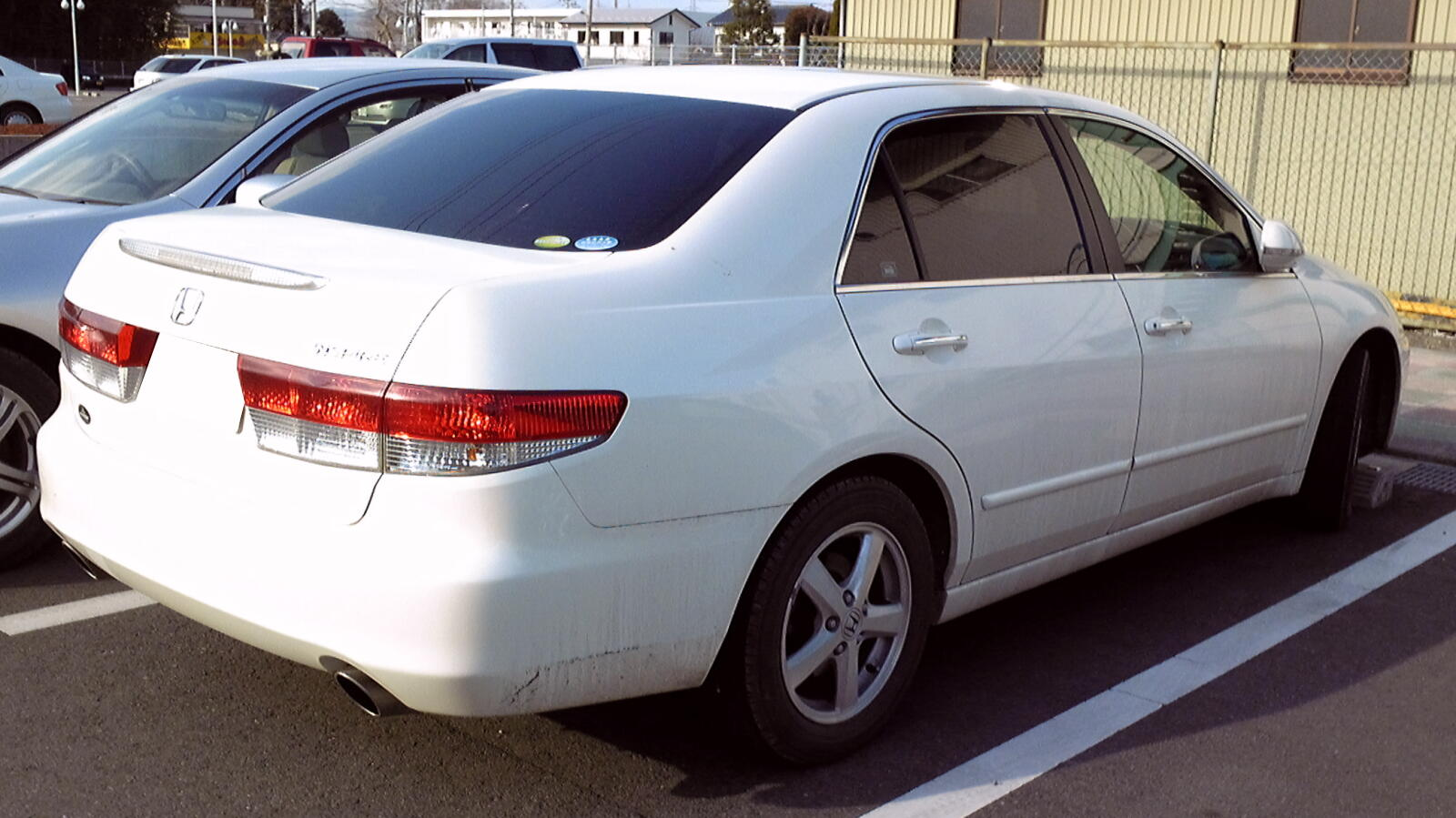
2003–2005 Honda Inspire

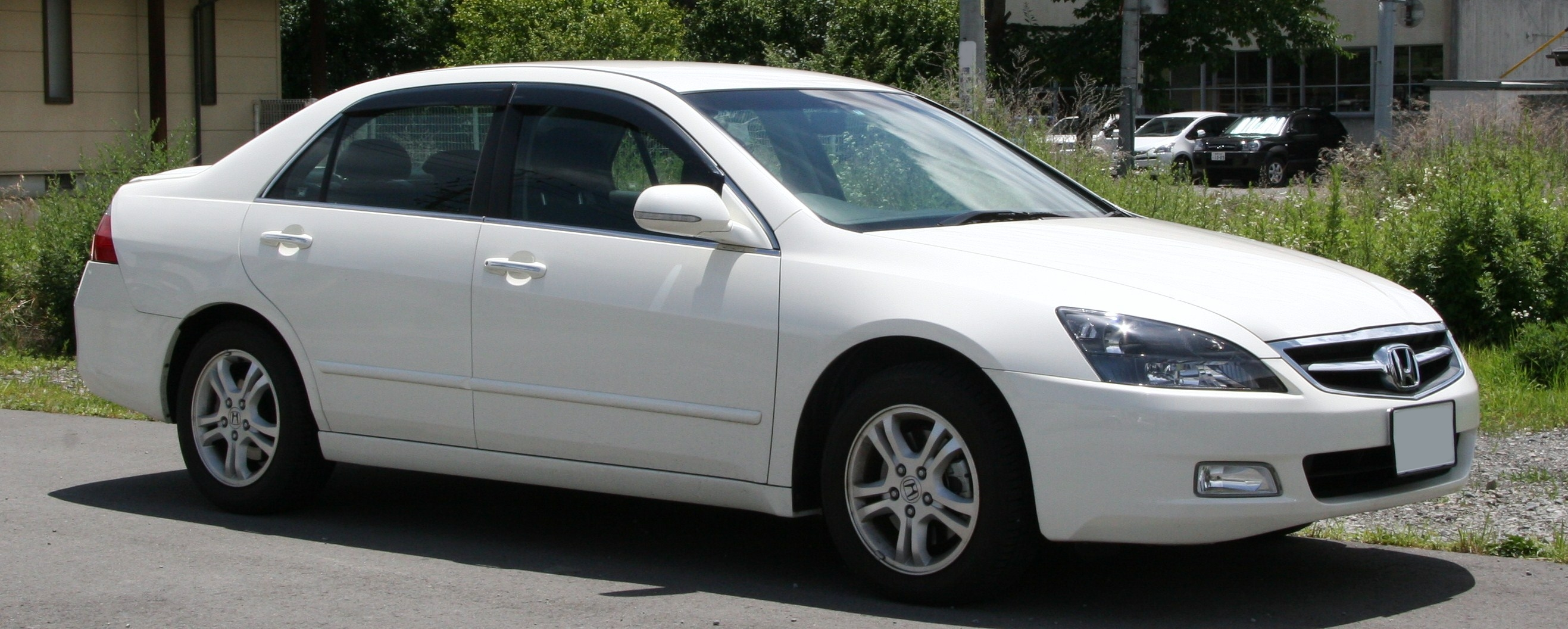
2005–2007 Honda Inspire

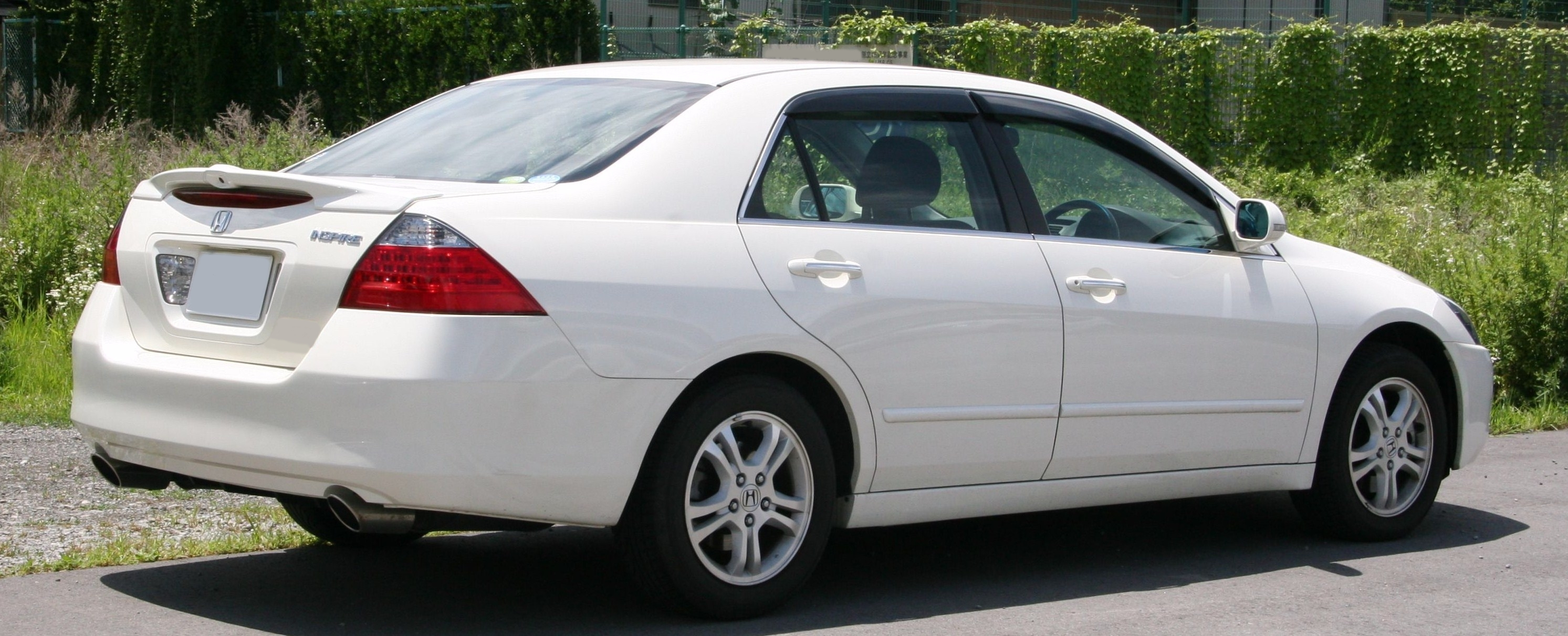
2005–2007 Honda Inspire

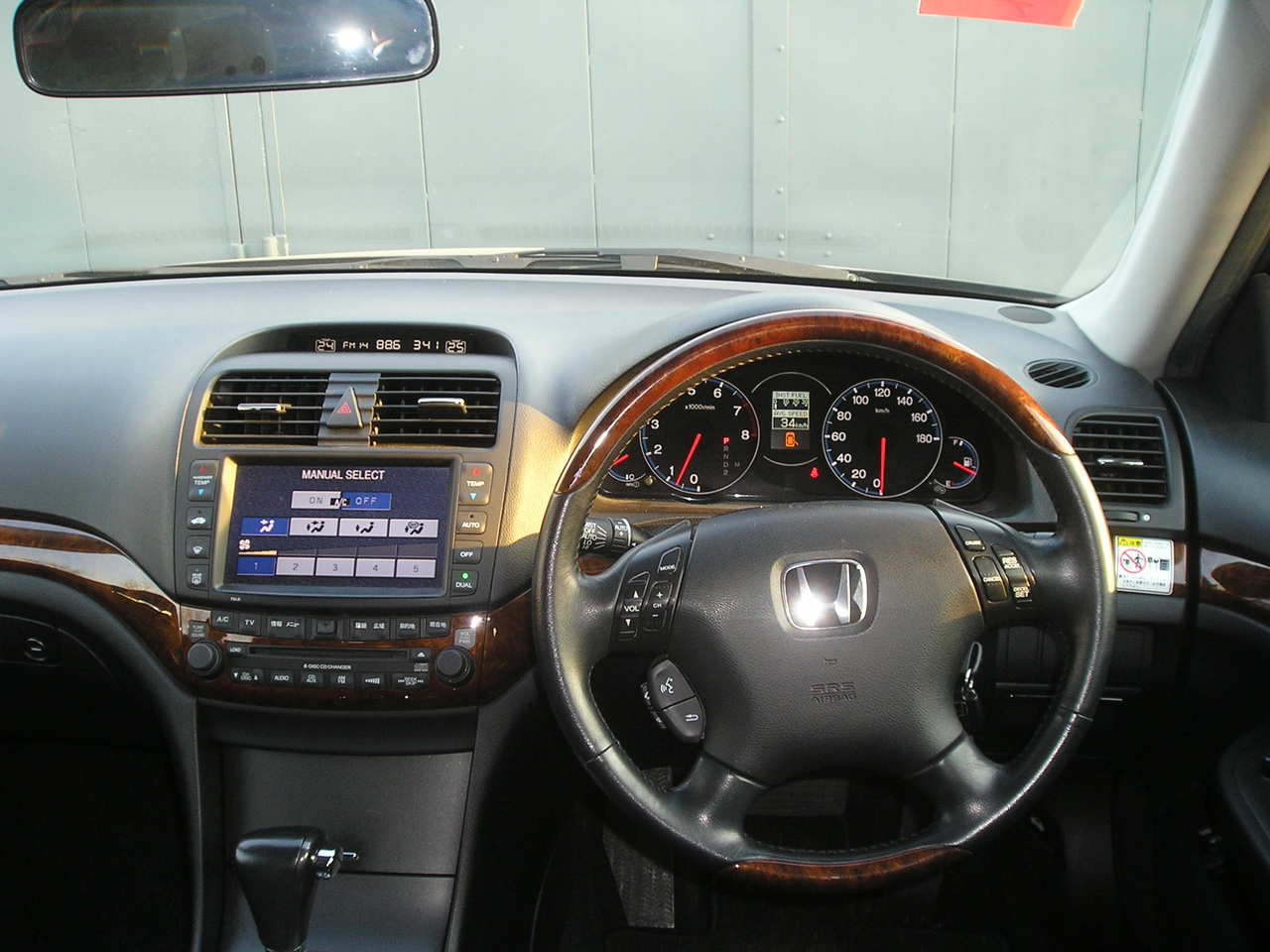
Interior

== Fifth generation (CP3; 2007) ==
Fifth generation
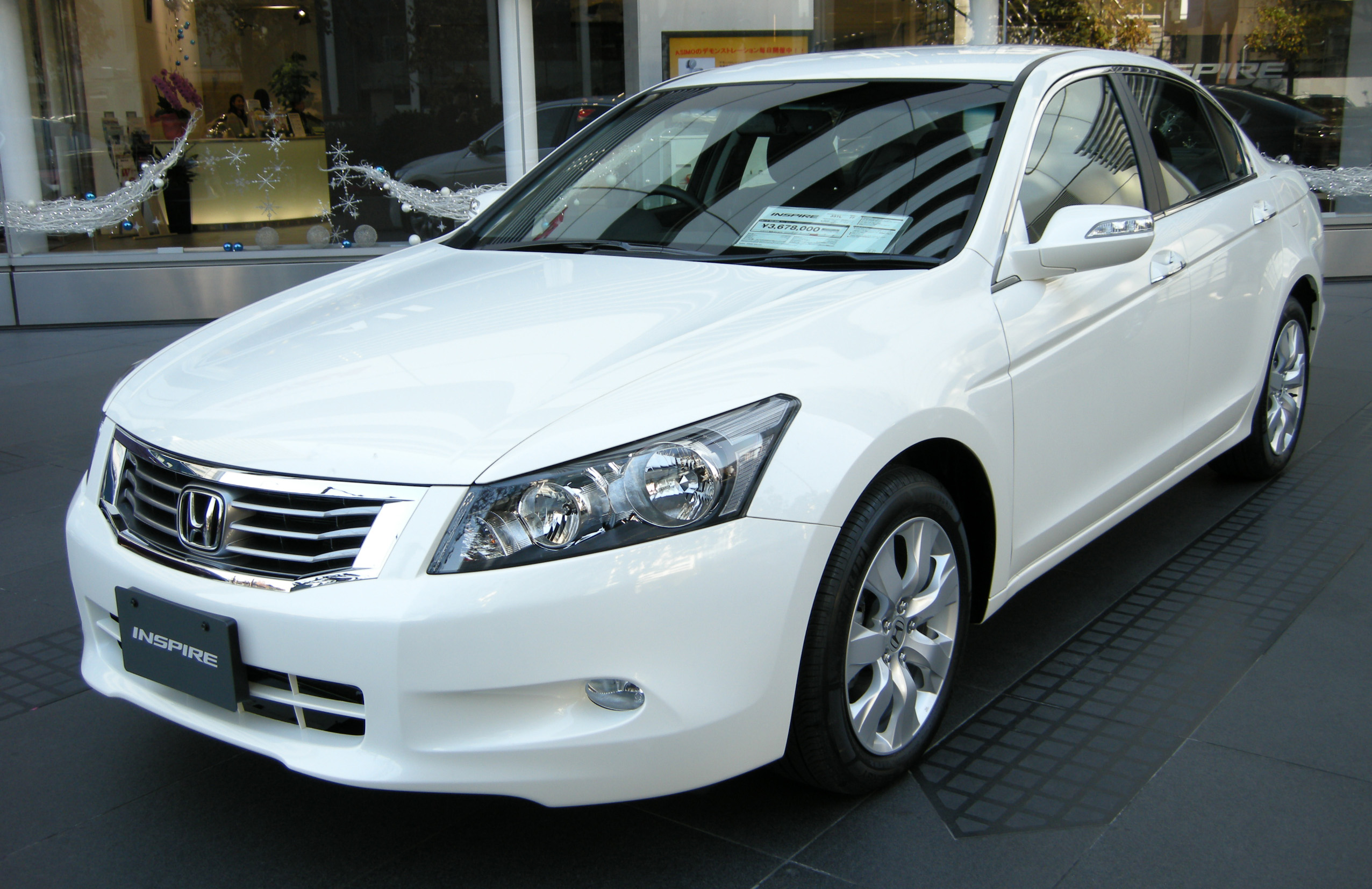

Overview
- Also called: Honda Accord (US-spec); Proton Perdana
- Production: 2007–2012
- Designer: Daisuke Sawai

Body and chassis
- Related: Honda Crosstour; Acura ZDX

Powertrain
- Engine: 3.5 L J35Z2 i-VTEC VCM V6
- Transmission: 5-speed automatic

Dimensions
- Wheelbase: 2,800 mm (110.2 in)
- Length: 4,940 mm (194.5 in)
- Width: 1,845 mm (72.6 in)
- Height: 1,475 mm (58.1 in)
- Curb weight: 1,620 kg (3,570 lb)

Chronology
- Successor: Honda Accord (ninth generation)

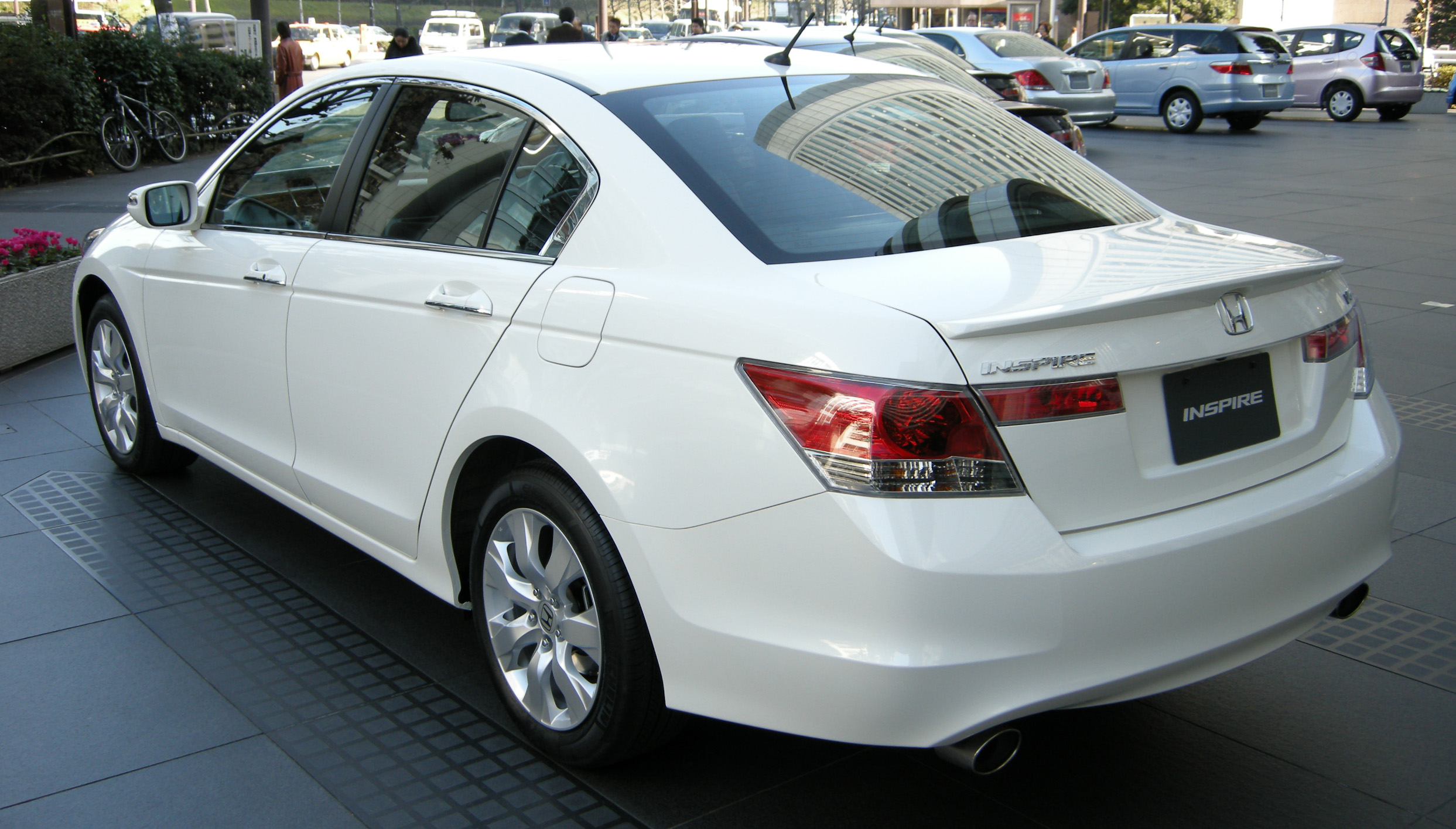
Rear view

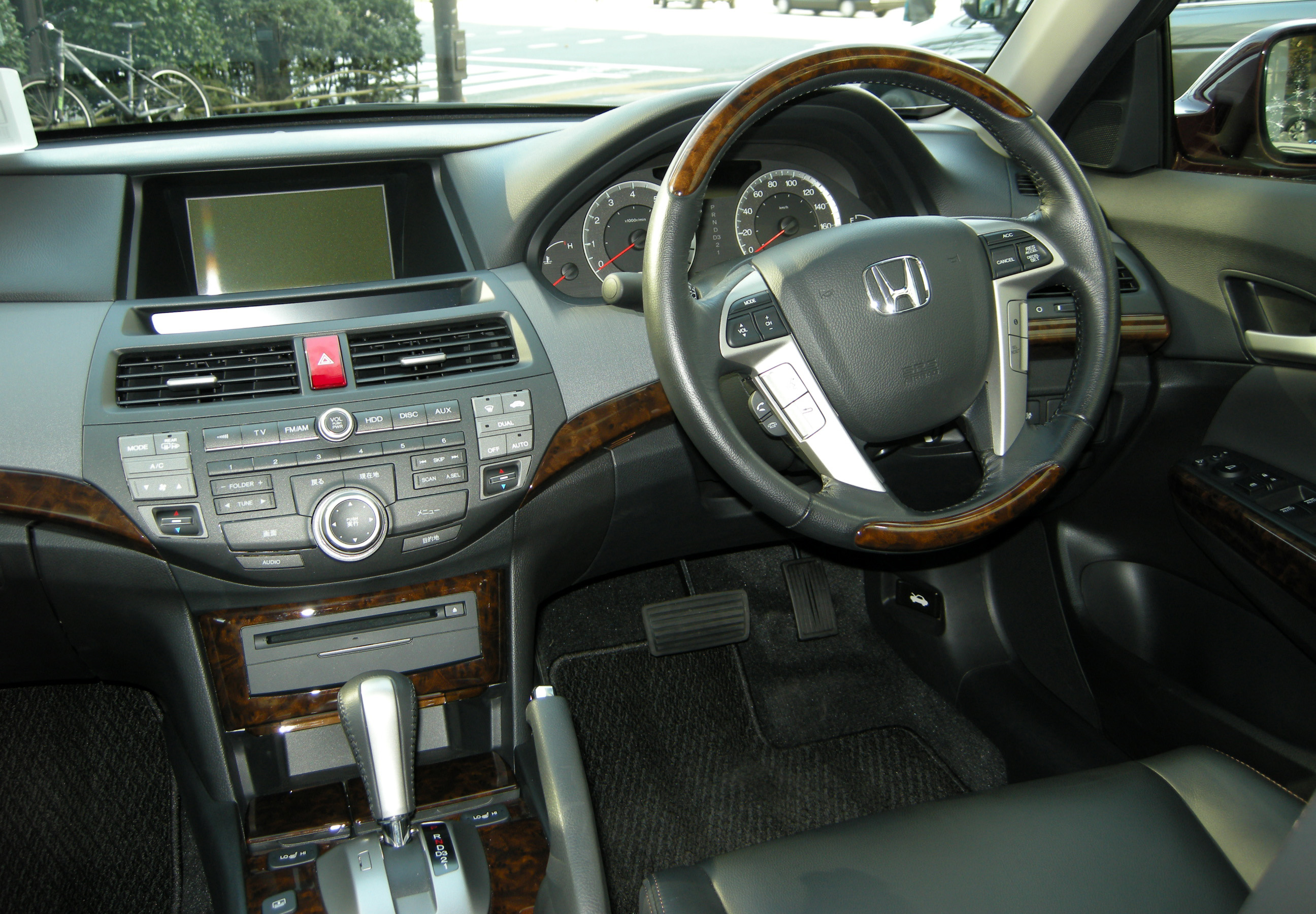
Interior

The fifth generation Honda Inspire was released on December 21, 2007 in Japan. Like the fourth generation Inspire, the fifth generation would be based on the North American eighth generation Honda Accord. Unlike the North American car it was based upon, and like its predecessor, the fifth generation Inspire would only be available as a sedan with a V6. It would use a similar 5-speed automatic transmission, but power would be increased by switching to the 3.5 L J35Z2 i-VTEC VCM V6 (marked as J35A-80).

Unlike its North American relative, the Inspire continued to have technologies such as Collision Mitigation Brake System (CMBS), IHCC is replaced with Adaptive Cruise Control (ACC), and Honda's Internavi telematics subscription service. One significant change was the switch to hydraulic power steering, replacing Electric power-steering.

There are few exterior and interior differences between this Inspire and the Southeast Asian Honda Accord. Sales of this generation of the Inspire ended September 2012 in Japan.

== Sixth generation (CV4 & CV6; 2018) ==
Sixth generation
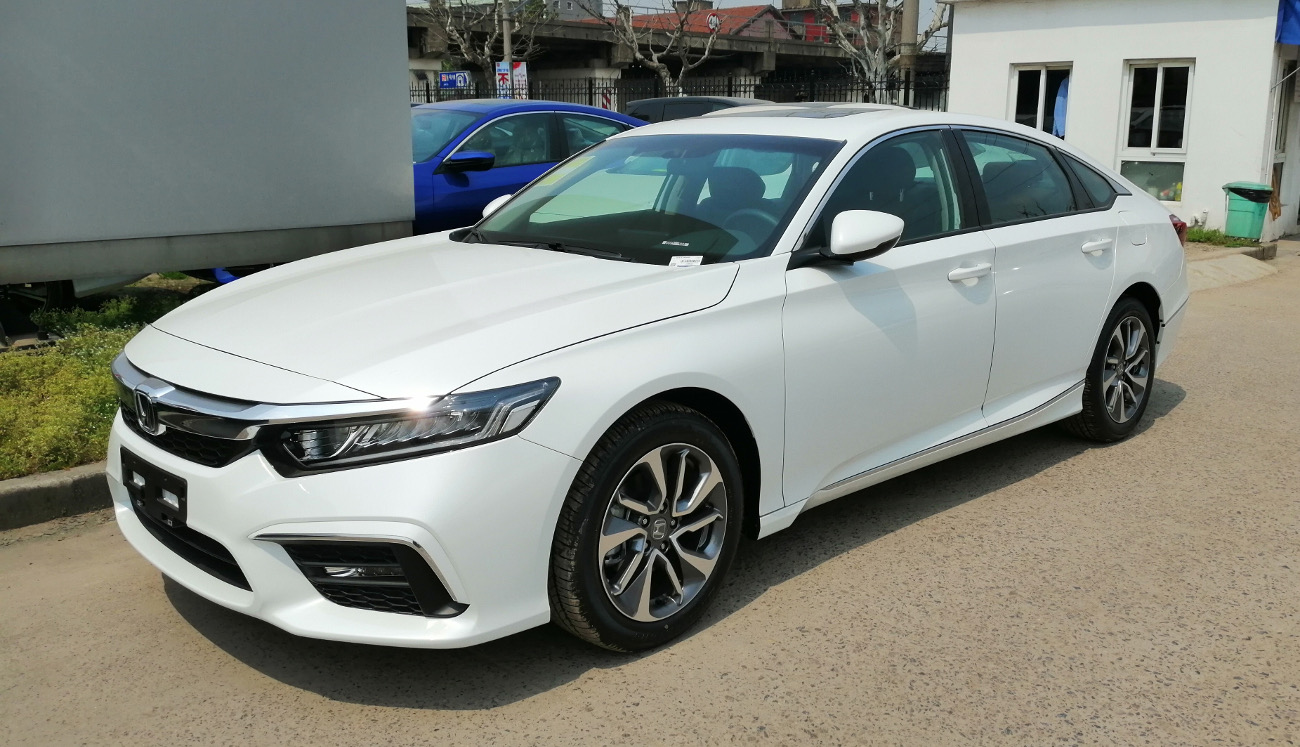
- Sixth generation Honda Inspire

Overview
- Also called: Honda Accord (tenth generation)
- Production: 2018–2023

Powertrain
- Engine: 1.5 L L15B7 turbo I4; 2.0 L LFA1/LFB1 PGM-FI DOHC i-VTEC I4 + 2 electric motors (hybrid)
- Transmission: CVT

Dimensions
- Wheelbase: 2,830 mm (111.4 in)
- Length: 4,882 mm (192.2 in)
- Width: 1,862 mm (73.3 in)
- Height: 1,450 mm (57.1 in)

Chronology
- Predecessor: Honda Spirior

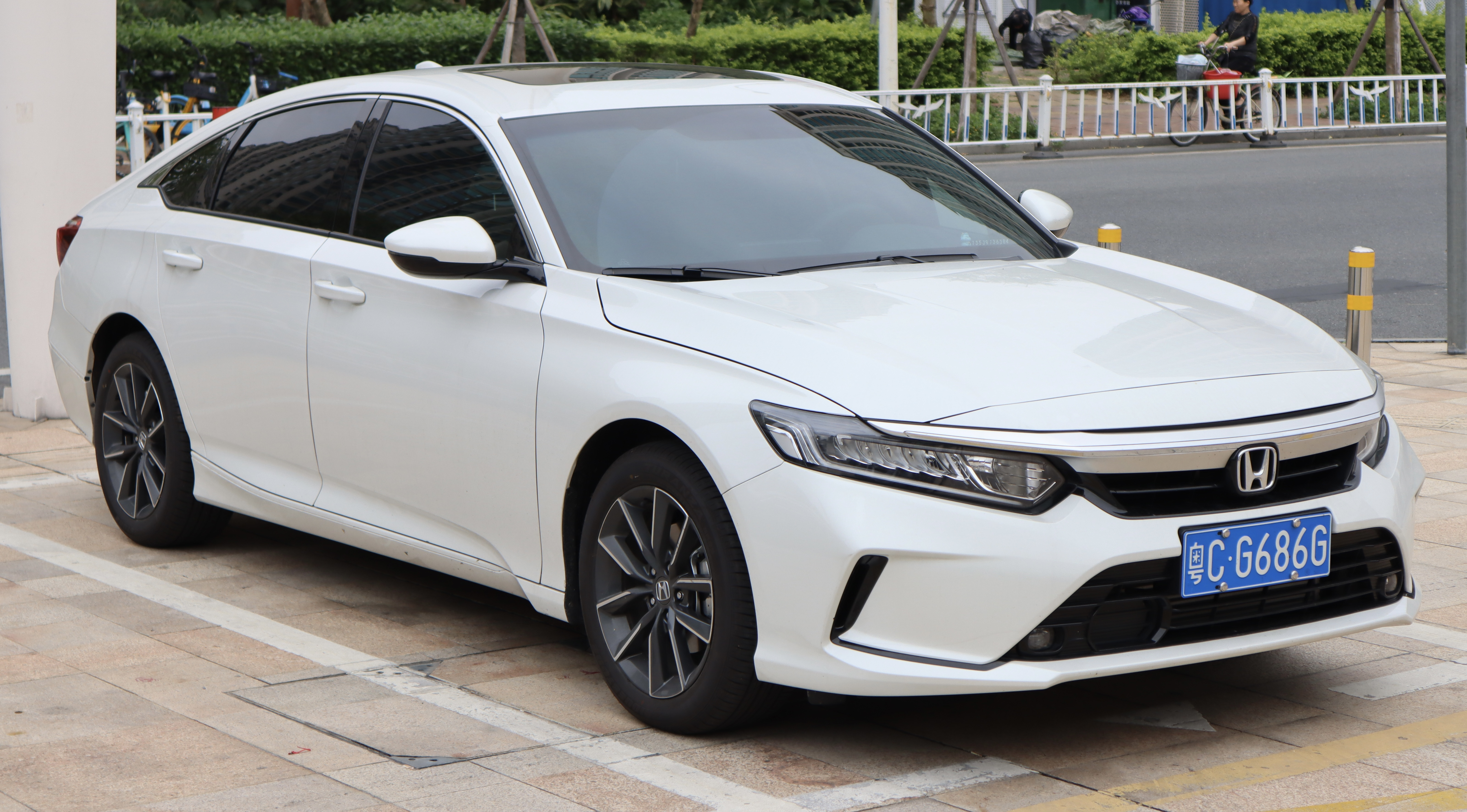

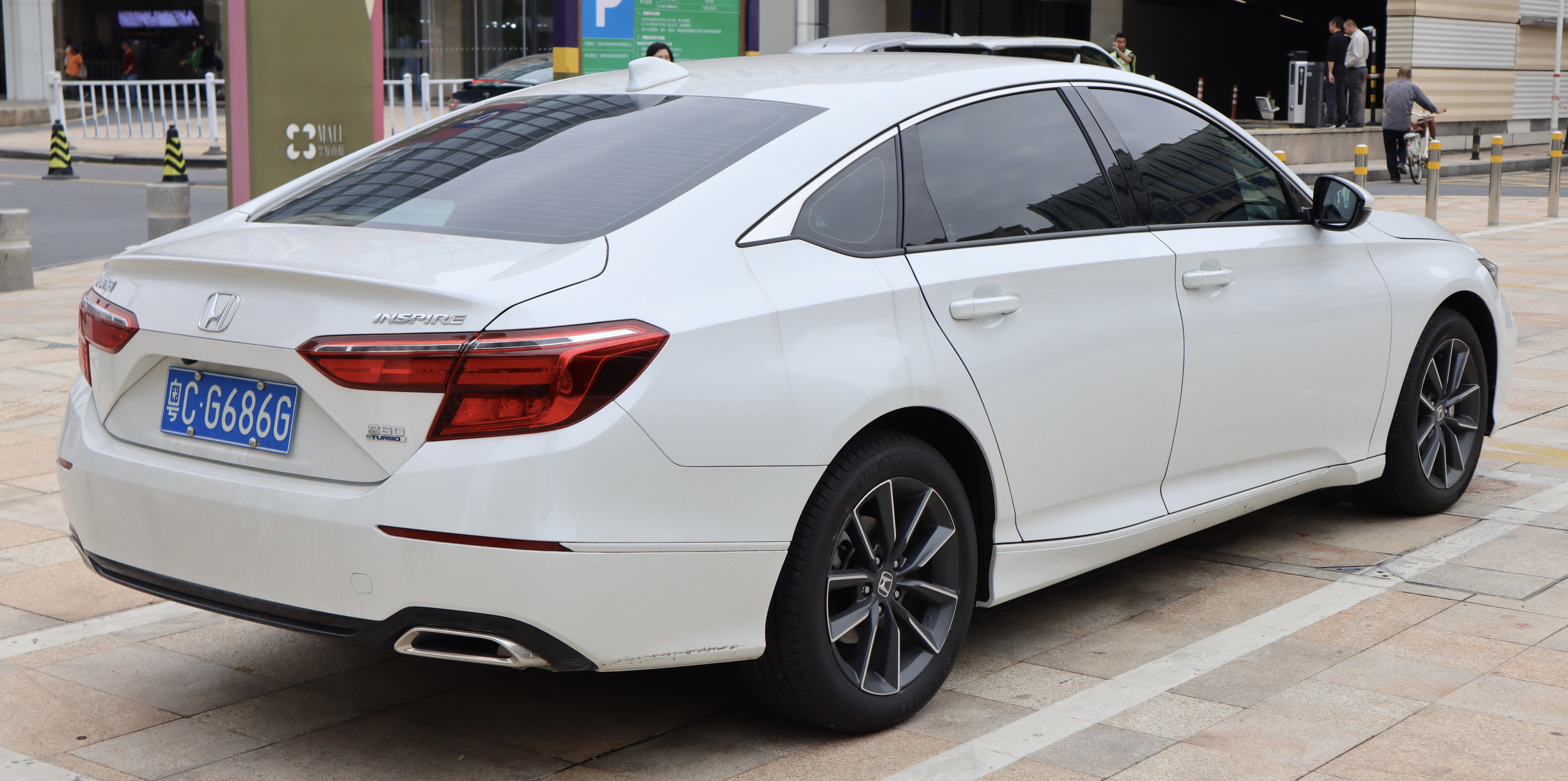
Honda Inspire 260 Turbo (facelift)

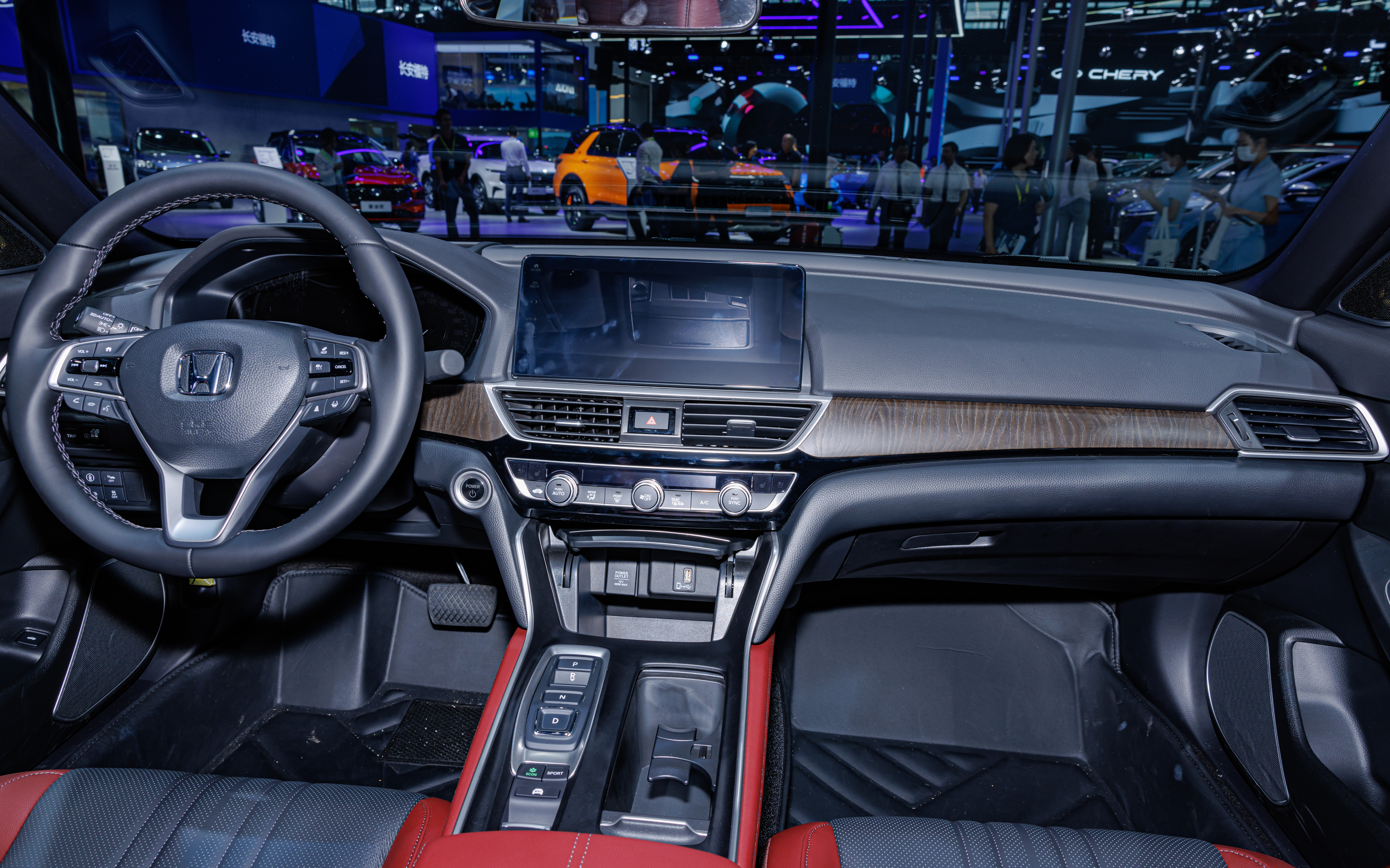
Interior

The sixth generation Inspire was released in 2018 as a sedan designed exclusively for the Chinese market. It is based on the North American tenth generation Honda Accord with a redesigned front and rear DRG. The sixth generation Inspire is made by Dongfeng Honda to replace the Spirior.

It is available with either the 1.5-liter L15B7 inline-four or the 2-liter LFB11/12 inline-four.

== Seventh generation (CY; 2023) ==
Seventh generation
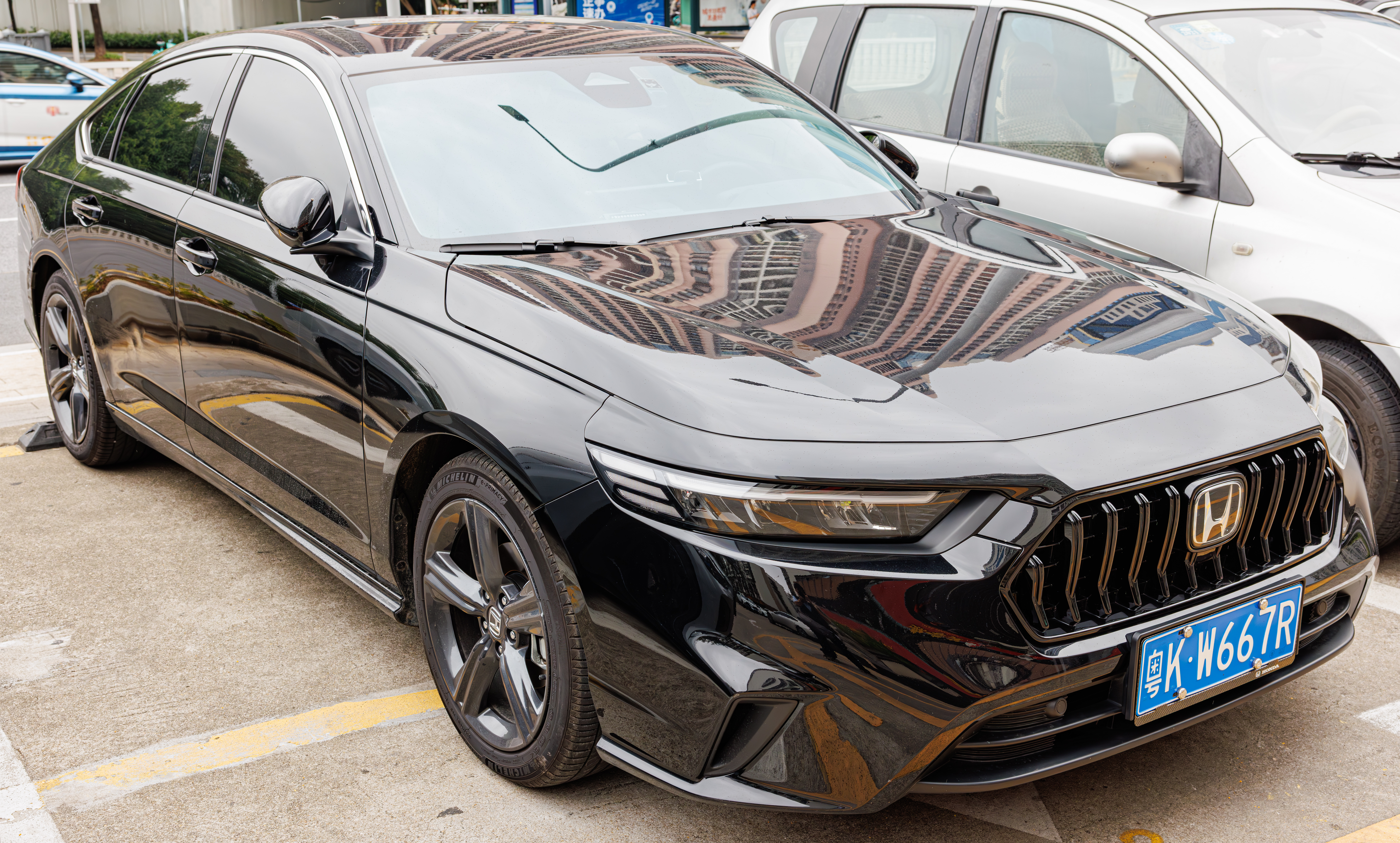
- Seventh generation Honda Inspire

Overview
- Also called: Honda Accord (eleventh generation)
- Production: 2023–present

Powertrain
- Engine: 1.5 L L15B7 turbo I4; 2.0 L LFA1/LFB1 PGM-FI DOHC i-VTEC I4 + 2 electric motors (hybrid)
- Transmission: CVT

Dimensions
- Wheelbase: 2,830 mm (111.4 in)
- Length: 4,970 mm (195.7 in)
- Width: 1,860 mm (73.2 in)
- Height: 1,450 mm (57.1 in)

The seventh-generation Inspire, based on the eleventh-generation Accord, went on sale in late May 2023.

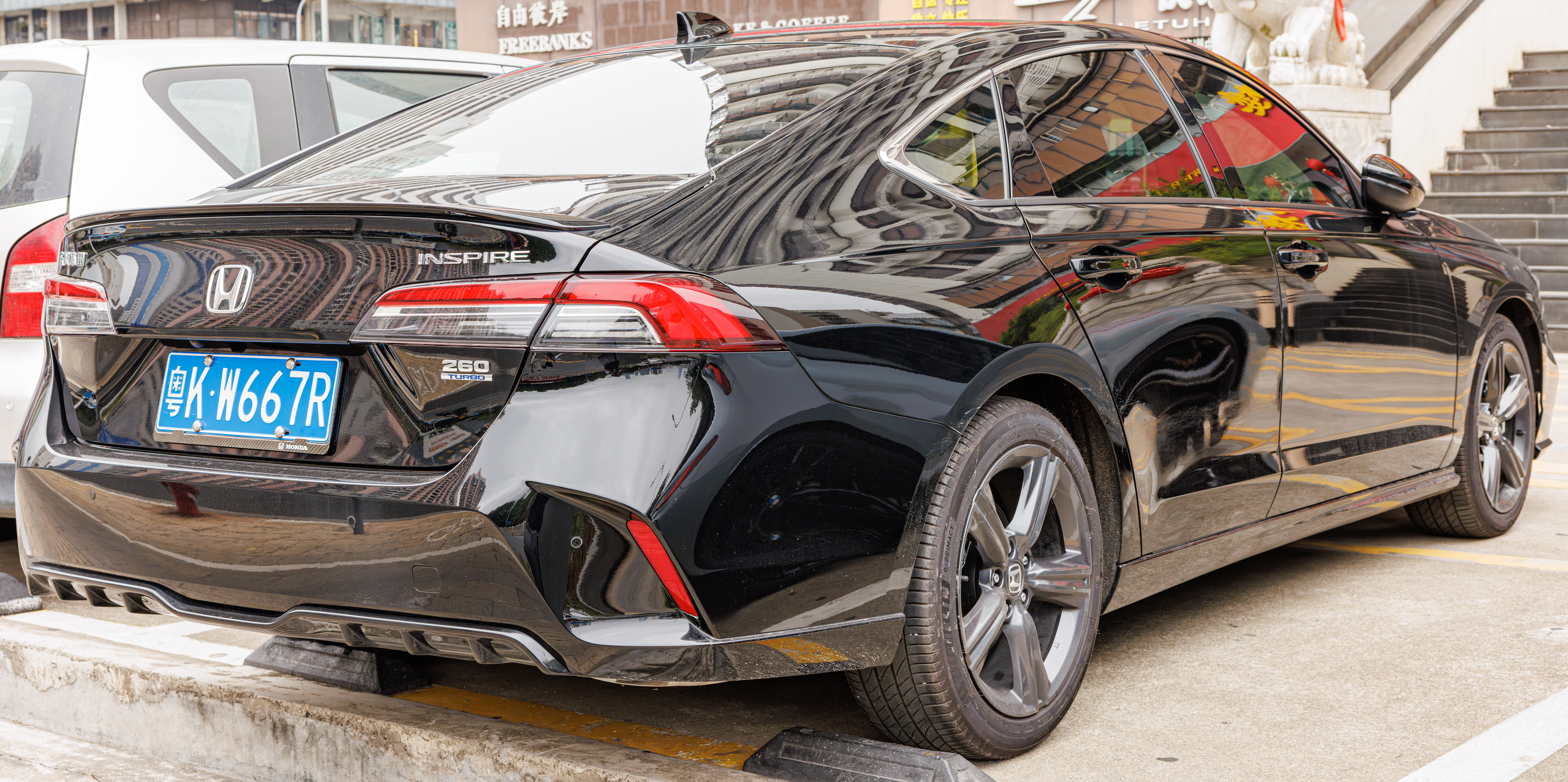
Rear view

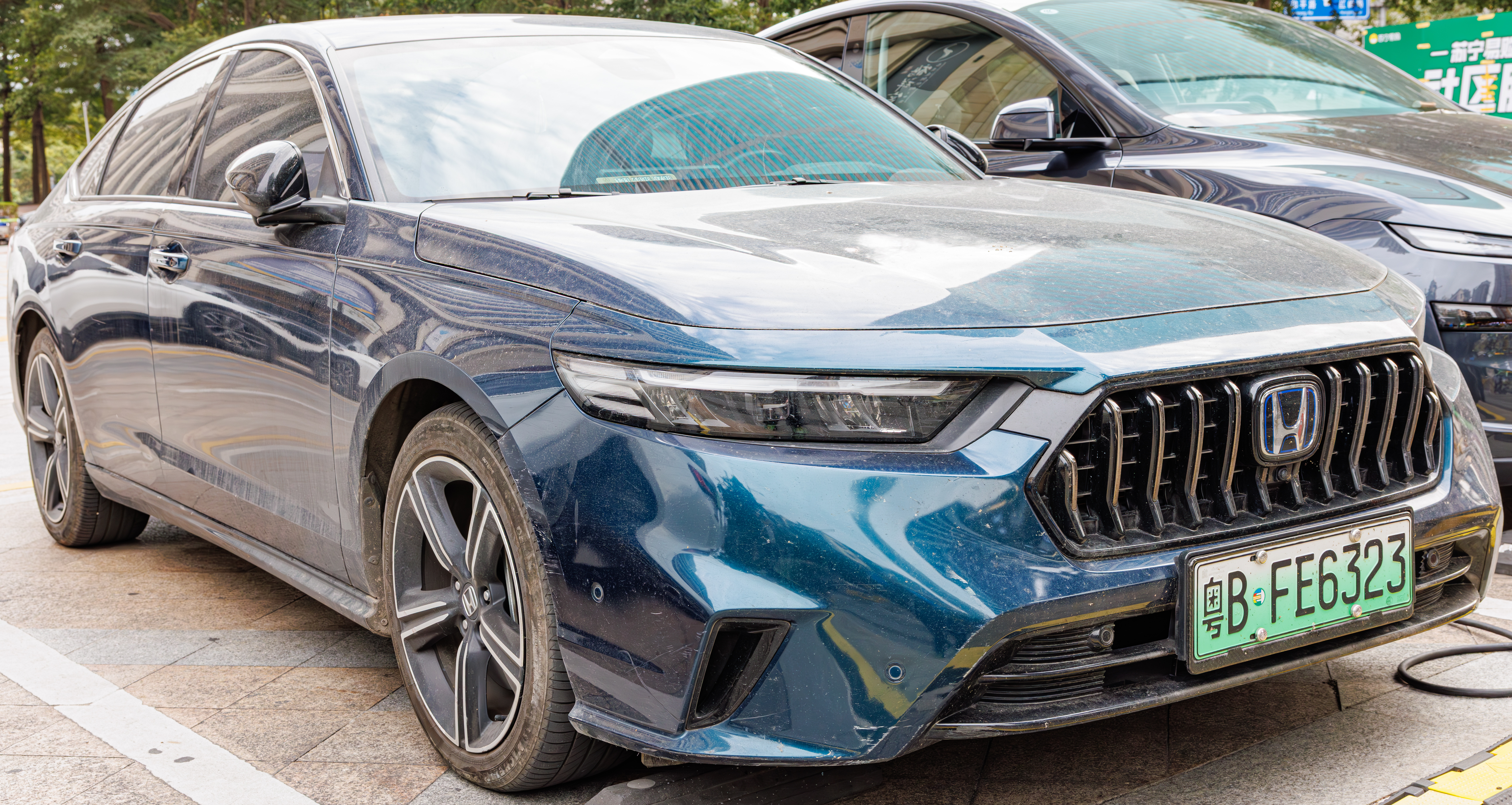
Honda Inspire e:PHEV

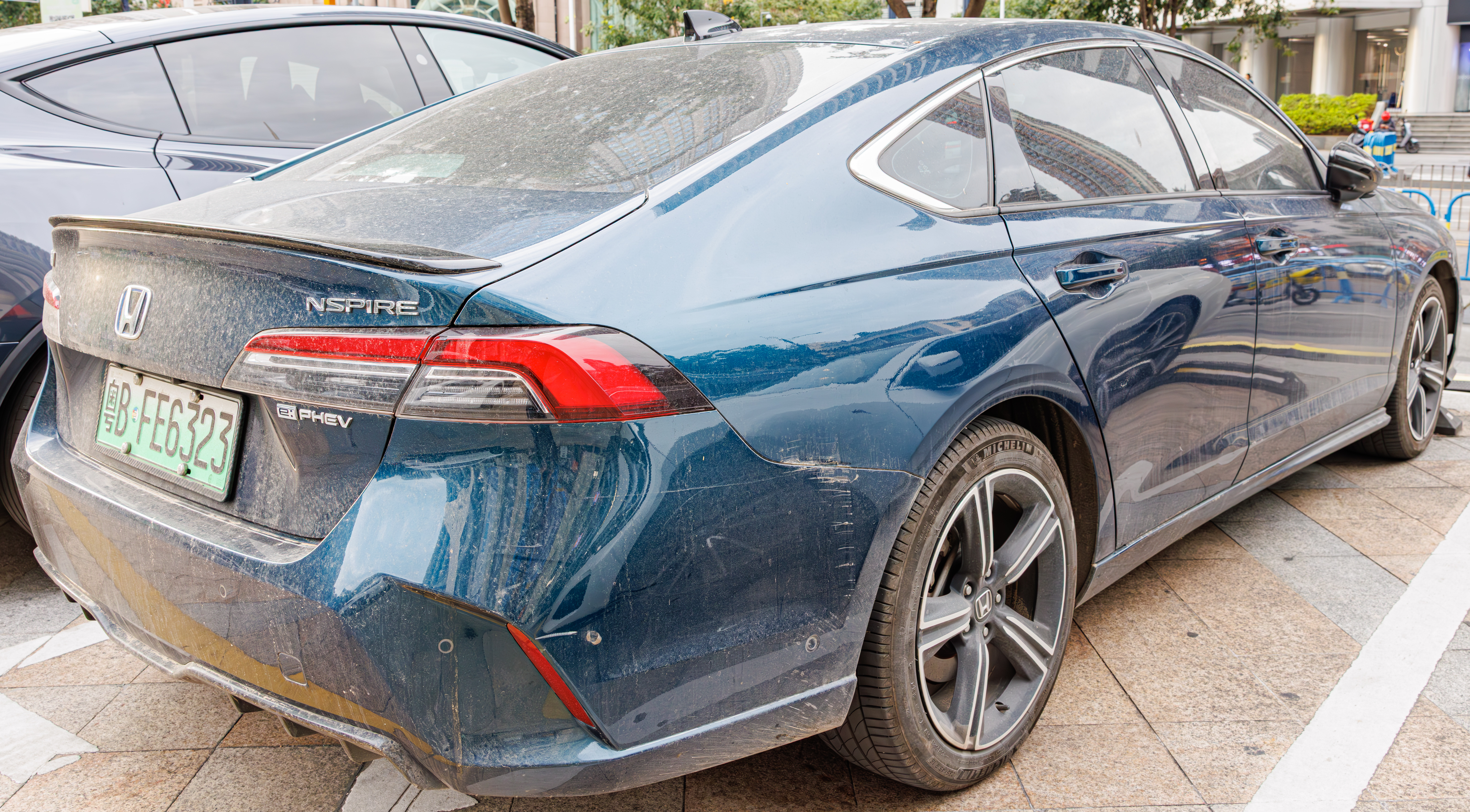
Honda Inspire e:PHEV Rear view

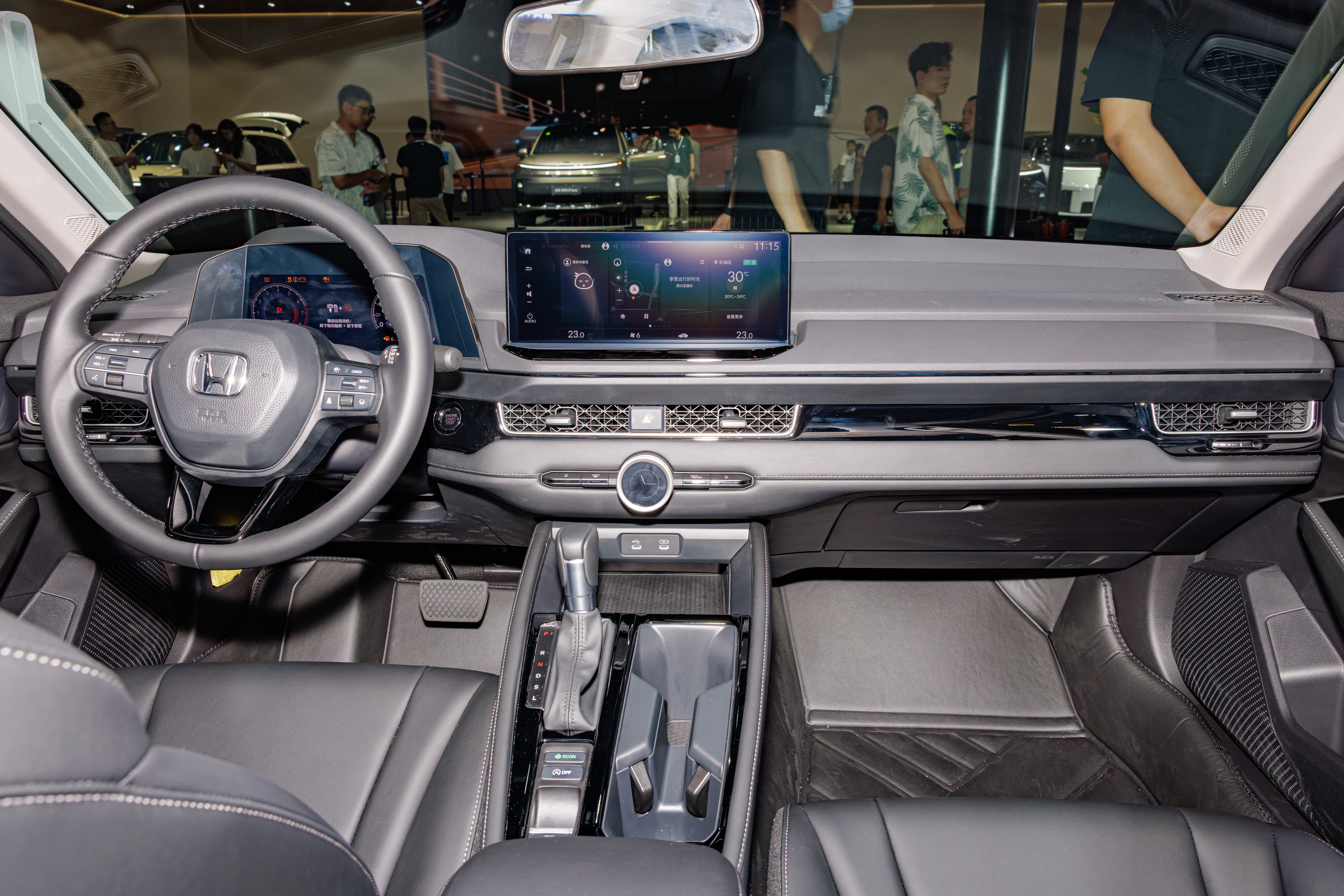
Interior
