= Honda G engine =

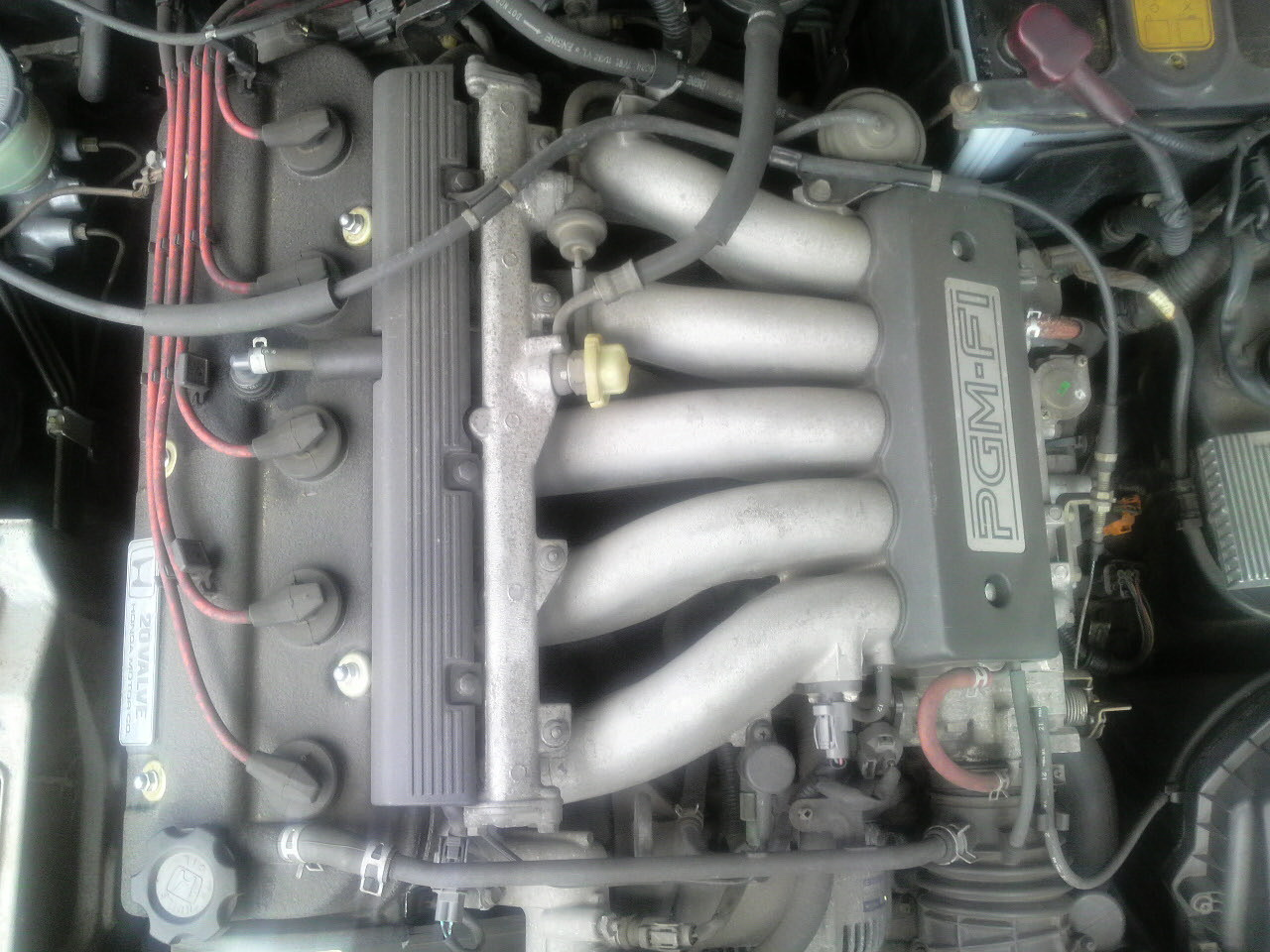

Overview
- Manufacturer: Honda Motor Manufacturing
- Production: 1989–1998

Layout
- Configuration: Naturally aspirated inline-5
- Displacement: 2.0–2.5 L; 121.8–149.6 cu in (1,996–2,451 cc)
- Cylinder bore: 82 mm (3.23 in); 85 mm (3.35 in)
- Piston stroke: 75.6 mm (2.98 in); 86.4 mm (3.40 in)
- Cylinder block material: Aluminum
- Cylinder head material: Aluminum
- Valvetrain: SOHC 4 valves x cyl.
- Compression ratio: 9.0:1-10.0:1

RPM range
- Max. engine speed: 6800

Combustion
- Fuel system: Fuel injection
- Fuel type: Gasoline
- Cooling system: Water-cooled

Output
- Power output: 114–140 kW (155–190 PS; 153–188 hp)
- Torque output: 19–24.2 kg⋅m (186–237 N⋅m; 137–175 lb⋅ft)

The Honda G-series engine is a family of slanted inline-five cylinder gasoline engines. The engine family features a single overhead cam layout with 4 valves per cylinder. The engine's displacement varied from 2.0 L; 121.8 cu in (1,996 cc) to 2.5 L; 149.6 cu in (2,451 cc). The G-Series was originally used in the 1989 Honda Vigor, Honda Rafaga, Honda Ascot and Honda Inspire before being carried over to the Vigor's successor; the Acura TL, which used the G-Series family of engines from 1995 to 1998 in North America, and continued use in the JDM Honda Saber until 1998 as well.

== G20A ==
- Displacement: 2.0 L; 121.8 cu in (1,996 cc)
- Bore x Stroke: 82 mm × 75.6 mm (3.23 in × 2.98 in)
- Compression ratio: 9.7:1
- Max Power: 114–118 kW (155–160 PS; 153–158 hp) at 6700 rpm
- Max Torque: 19 kg⋅m (186 N⋅m; 137 lb⋅ft) at 4000 rpm
- Redline: 6800 rpm
- Fuel Cutoff: 7100 rpm

Found in the 1989-1991 JDM Inspire/Vigor (CB5), 1992-1994 JDM Inspire/Vigor 20 (CC3), 1993-1997 JDM Ascot/Rafaga 2.0 (CE4), and 1995-1997 JDM Inspire/Saber 20 (UA1).

== G25A ==
- Displacement: 2.5 L; 149.6 cu in (2,451 cc)
- Bore x Stroke: 85 mm × 86.4 mm (3.35 in × 3.40 in)
- Compression ratio: 10.0:1
- Max Power: 140 kW (190 PS; 188 hp) at 6500 rpm
- Max Torque: 24.2 kg⋅m (237 N⋅m; 175 lb⋅ft) at 3800 rpm
- Redline: 6800 rpm
- Fuel Cutoff: 7100 rpm

Found in the 1992-1994 JDM Inspire/Vigor 25 (CC2), 1993-1997 Ascot/Rafaga 2.5S (CE5), and 1995-1997 JDM Inspire/Saber 25 (UA2).

=== G25A1 ===
- Compression ratio: 9.0:1

Found in the 1992-1994 USDM & CDM Acura Vigor (CC2).

=== G25A4 ===
- Compression ratio: 9.6:1

Power: 176 hp (131 kW; 178 PS)

Found in the 1995-1998 USDM & CDM Acura 2.5TL (UA2).

== Gallery ==
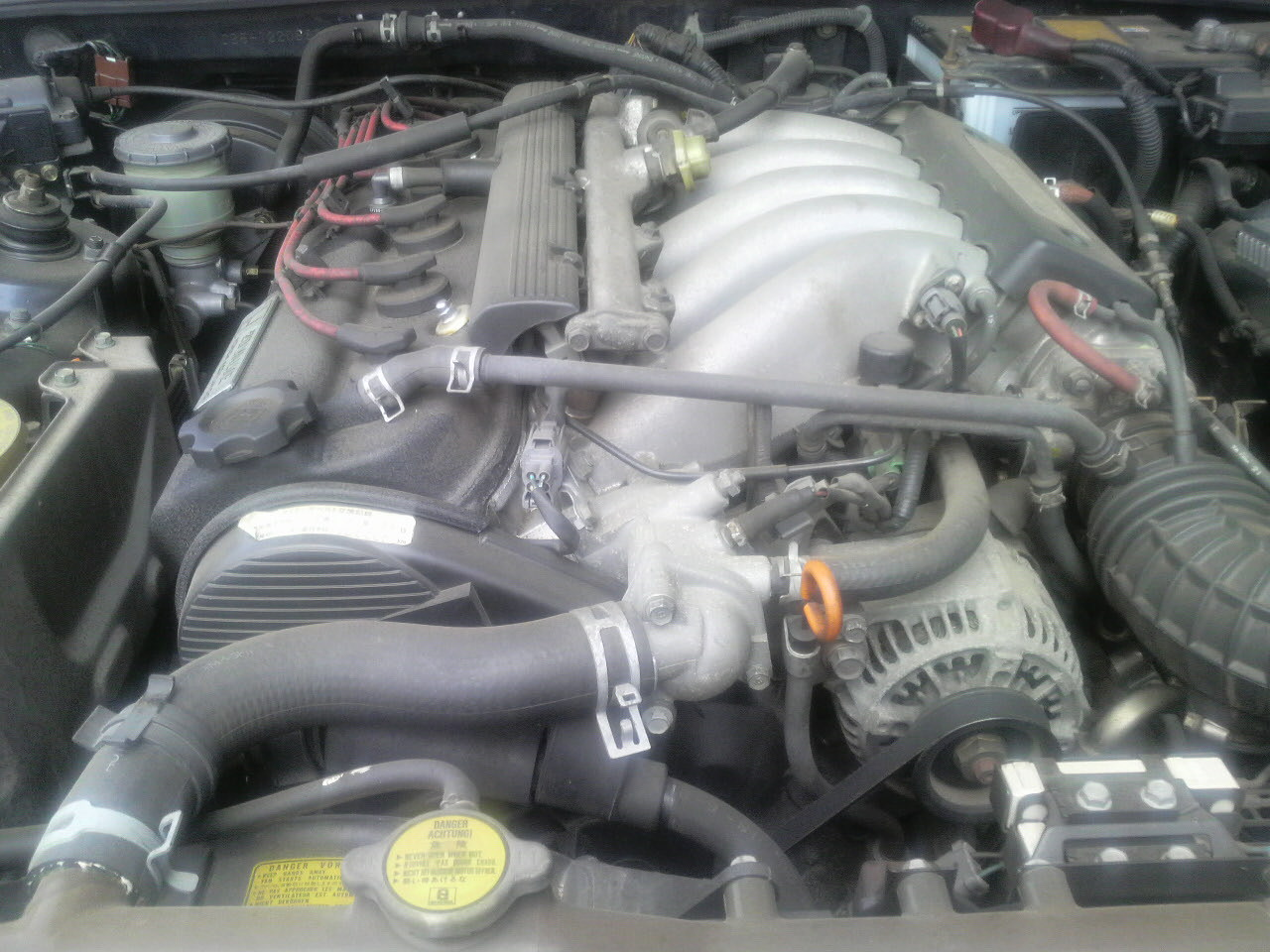
Front view

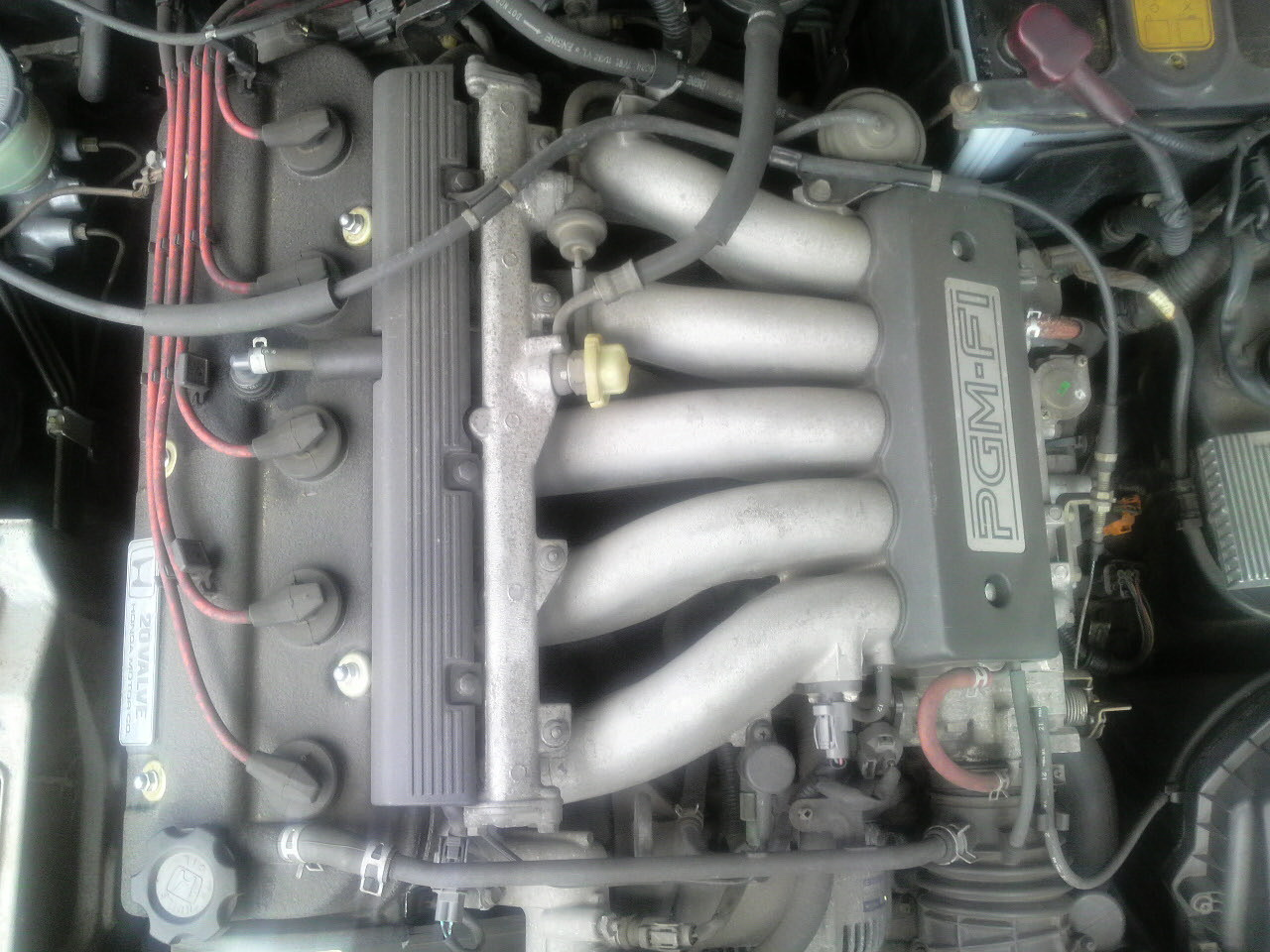
Top view

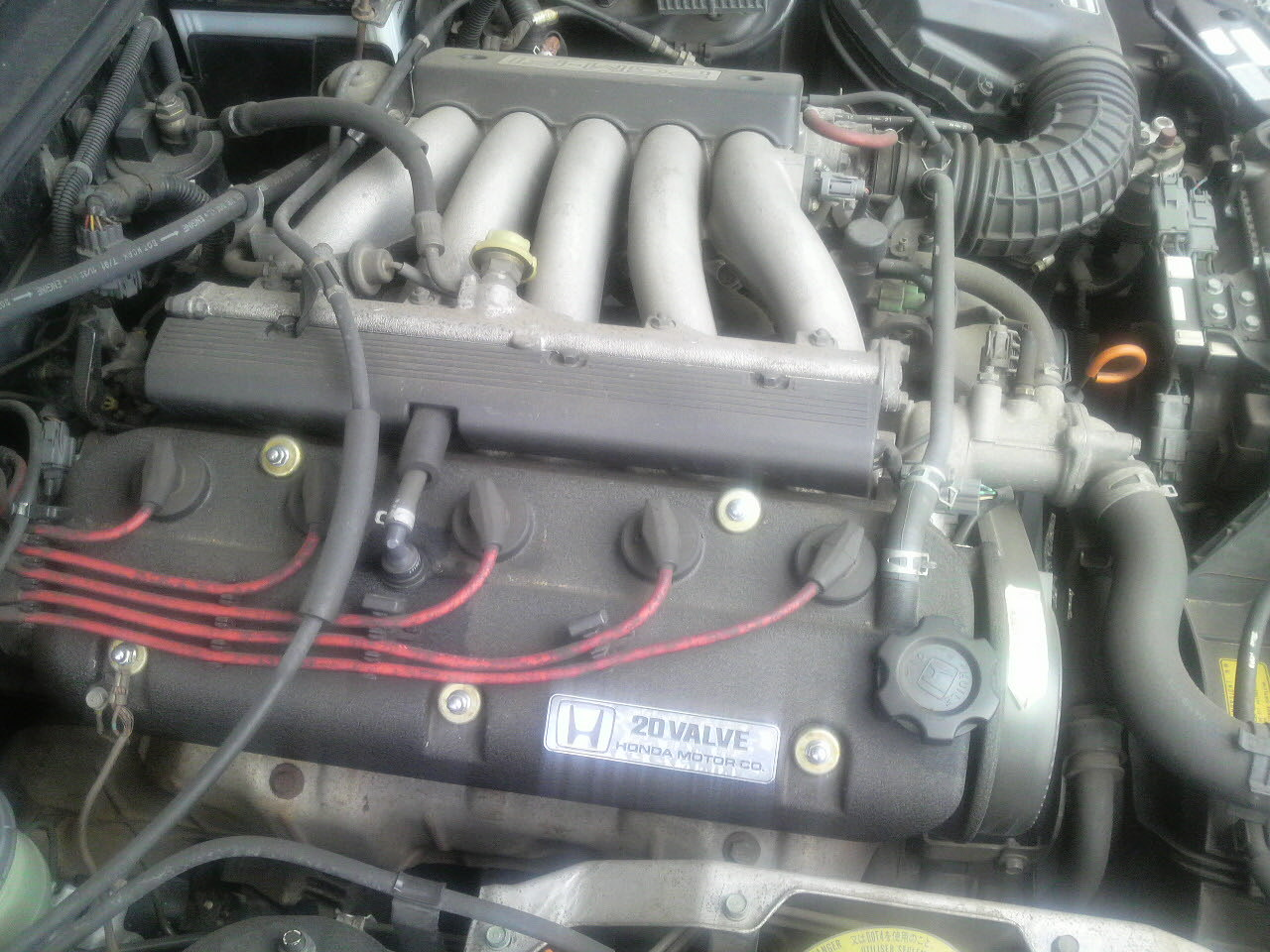
Left view

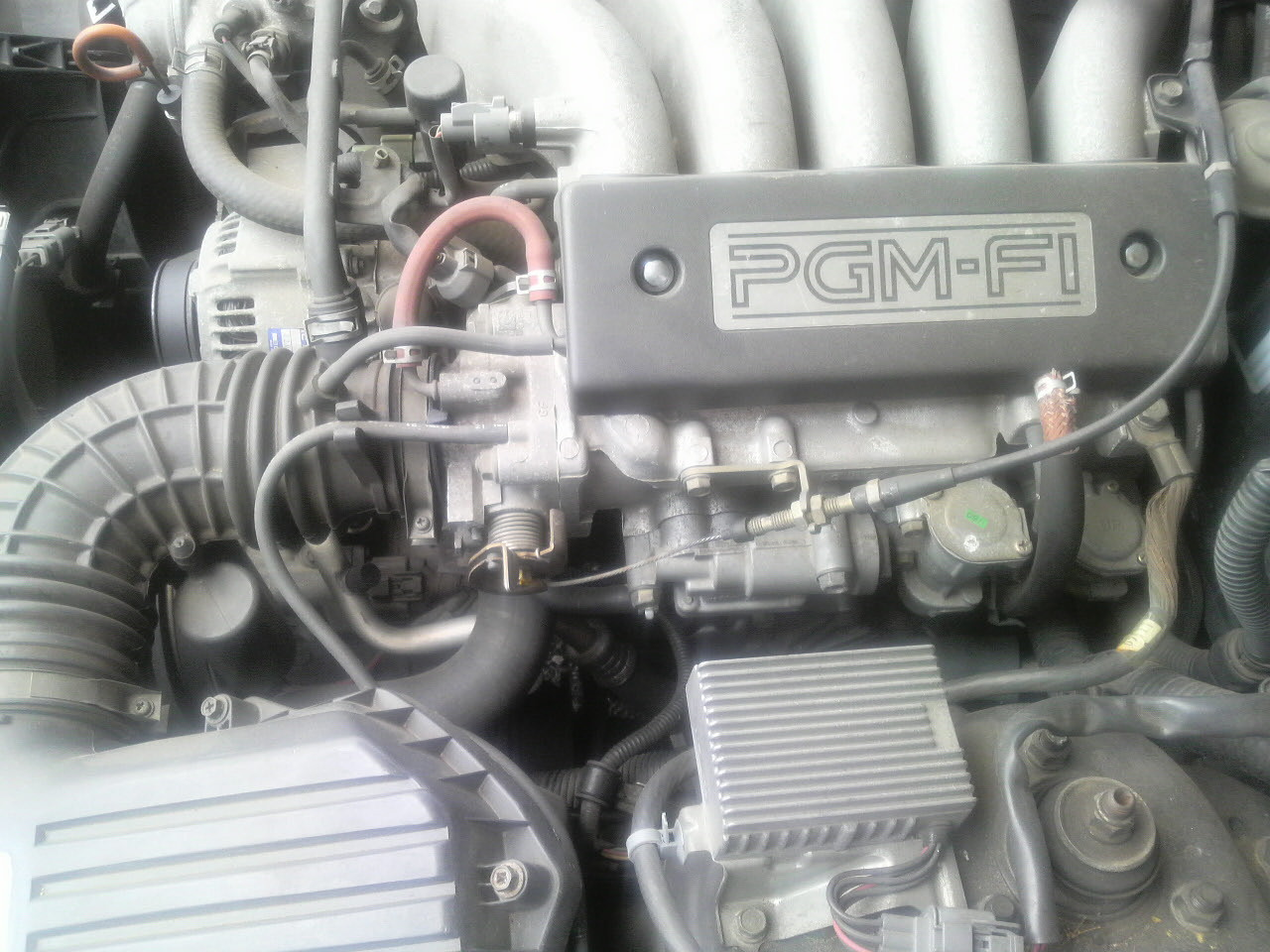
Right view
