= Tendo Mokko =

Japanese furniture manufacturer

Coordinates: 38.382249°N 140.376627°E

- Type: Unlisted
- Industry: Furniture
- Founded: 12 June 1940; 86 years ago
- Headquarters: Tendō, Yamagata, Japan
- Area served: Worldwide
- Number of employees: 350
- Website: Tendo-Mokko.co.jp (in English)

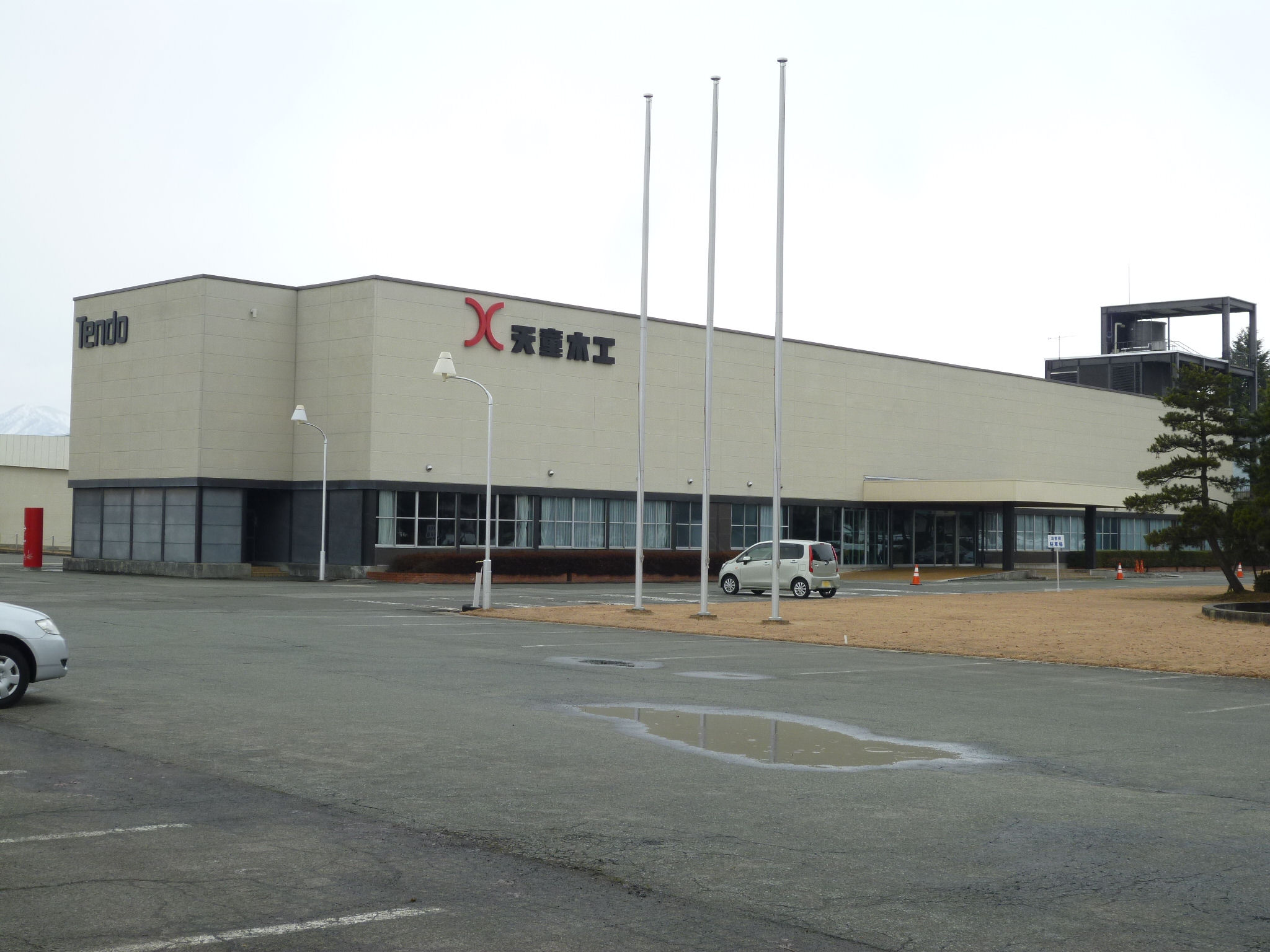
Tendo-Mokko Main office

Tendo Mokko (天童木工, Tendō Mokkō) is a Japanese furniture maker based in Tendō, Yamagata, Japan.

The speciality of Tendo Mokko is making fine furniture from plywood. Some of pieces that the company has produced have won design awards. Tendo Mokko chairs and tables are held in the collections of museums and have been sold for high prices at furniture auctions.

The company has collaborated with designers and architects such as Isamu Kenmochi, Sori Yanagi, Riki Watanabe, Daisaku Chō, Katsuhei Toyoguchi, Kenzo Tange, Bruno Mathsson, Katsuo Matsumura, Reiko Tanabe, and Arata Isozaki. Tendo Mokko has also manufactured wooden trim elements, as well as specially designed furniture for Lexus.
