= Honda Advanced Technology =

Honda research and development program

Honda Advanced Technology is part of Honda's long-standing research and development program focused on building new models for their automotive products and automotive-related technologies, with many of the advances pertaining to engine technology. Honda's research has led to practical solutions ranging from fuel-efficient vehicles and engines, to more sophisticated applications such as the humanoid robot, ASIMO, and the Honda HA-420 Honda-jet, a six-passenger business jet.

== Engine and Environmental Technology ==
=== i-VTEC ===
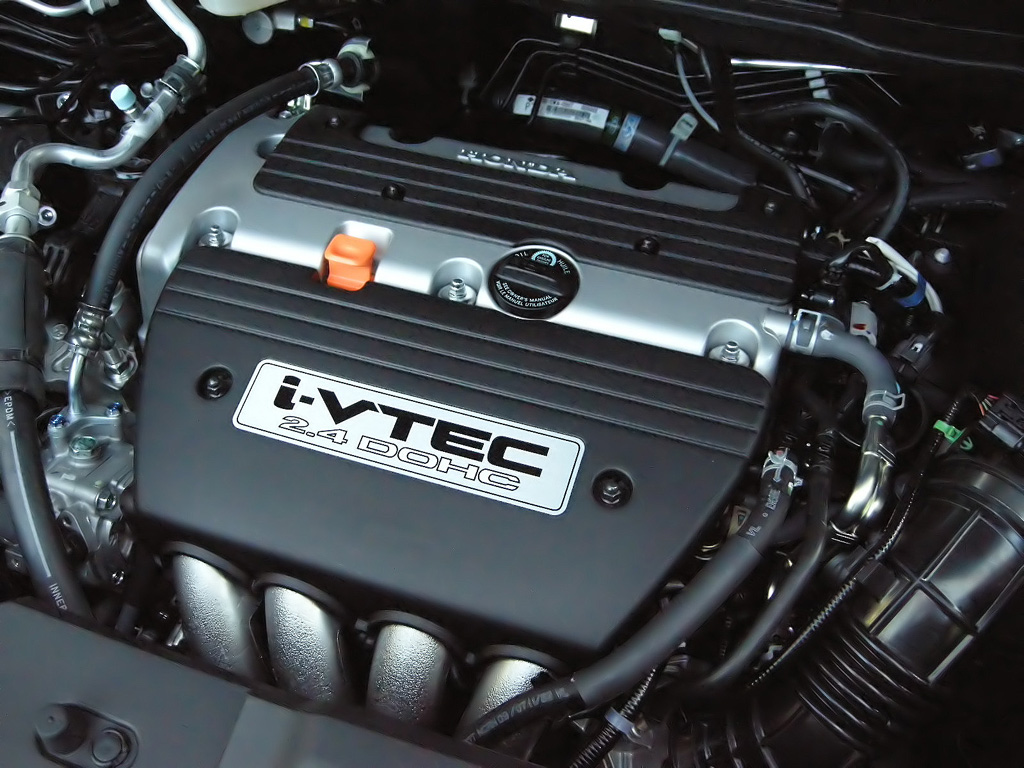
2.4 DOHC i-VTEC

i-VTEC is the acronym for intelligent VTEC (Variable Valve Timing and Lift Electronic Control), an evolution of Honda's VTEC engine. The i-VTEC engine works by controlling the timing and lifting of the camshafts depending on engine speeds. The valves open a small amount during low engine speeds to achieve optimal fuel efficiency. The valves will open wider at higher engine speeds to achieve higher performance.

Honda i-VTEC (intelligent-VTEC) has VTC continuously variable timing of camshaft phasing on the intake camshaft of DOHC VTEC engines. The technology first appeared on Honda's K-series four-cylinder engine family in 2001 (In the United States, the technology debuted on the 2002 Honda CR-V).

What is this referring to: The new mechanism debuted in 2003 with the V6 3.0-liter i-VTEC engine which used a new Variable Cylinder Management (VCM) technology that runs on six cylinders during acceleration but used only three cylinders during cruising and low engine loads. In 2006, Honda introduced the 1.8-liter i-VTEC engine for the Civic, which could deliver accelerated performance equivalent to a 2.0-liter engine with fuel efficiency that is 6% better than the 1.7-liter Civic engine. The high power output with low emissions and fuel economy largely contributed to the improvements in several areas:

- Delayed valve closure timing: This controls the intake volume of air-fuel mixture, allowing the throttle valve to remain wide open while reducing pumping losses of up to 16%, which allows the engine to deliver better power output.
- Drive-by-wire technology: This system provides increased precision control over the throttle valve when the valve timing changes, creating a better driving experience where the driver is unaware of any torque fluctuations.
- Restructured pistons: A more compact piston prevents residual gas accumulation, which in turn suppresses engine knocking. In addition, oil retention is improved thus reducing friction and increasing fuel efficiency.
- 2-bed catalytic converter: This is positioned immediately after the exhaust manifold, providing direct contact which allows for high-precision air-fuel ratio control to drastically reduce emission levels.
- Reduced engine weight: The mass of the connecting rods and overall materials used in building the engine frame is reduced, which helps the engine gain better power and fuel efficiency.

The i-VTEC technology is also integrated into Honda's hybrid vehicles to work in tandem with an electric motor. In Honda's 2006 Civic Hybrid, the 1.3-liter i-VTEC engine uses a 3-stage valve design, an advancement from the 2005 i-VTEC technology. Aside from weight and friction reduction, the engine operates on either low-speed timing, high-output timing or 4-cylinder idling when the VCM system is engaged, each yielding better engine output upon varying driving conditions. Its competency helped place the Honda Civic Hybrid as the third "Greenest Vehicle" in 2009.

=== Earth Dreams Technology ===
Earth Dreams Technology is Honda's comprehensive powertrain strategy, unveiled on November 30, 2011, aimed at reducing CO_{2} emissions by approximately 30% by 2020 (compared to 2000 levels) and achieving class-leading fuel efficiency within three years of its launch. To improve fuel economy by around 10%, Earth Dreams introduces a suite of engineering enhancements across engines and transmissions, including the adoption of DOHC architecture, variable valve timing control (VTC), direct injection, Atkinson cycle operation, high-capacity exhaust gas recirculation (EGR), and electric water pumps. Structural improvements such as reduced bore pitch, thinner cylinder blocks and camshafts, and overall engine weight reduction are also implemented, along with friction-reducing measures to improve thermal efficiency and performance.

==== Key components ====
1. Variable valve systems: DOHC combined with VTEC, and continuously variable timing control (VTC) improve combustion efficiency and reduce pumping losses.
2. Direct injection & Atkinson cycle: enhance thermal efficiency, particularly in compact and mid-sized engines.
3. Lightweight construction: reduced bore pitch and thinner cylinder block and camshaft walls, yielding engine mass reductions (e.g., ~15% in kei‑car S-series units).
4. Friction reduction: optimized internal components and coatings lower mechanical losses.
5. High-capacity exhaust gas recirculation: lowers combustion temperatures and reduces NO_{x} emissions.
6. Electric water pumps: remove the need for accessory belts, reducing parasitic drag.

==== Applications ====
- Gasoline engines: from 660 cc kei-powered S‑series to turbocharged VTEC units; includes K‑series Earth Dreams i‑VTEC and VTEC‑Turbo engines.
- Diesel engines: notably the 1.6 L i‑DTEC; features lightweight aluminium block, turbocharging, common‑rail injection, EGR, and DPF, targeting sub‑100 g/km CO_{2} ratings.
- Transmissions: upgraded CVTs with reinforced belts, electronic oil pumps, and "G‑Design Shift" logic, improving efficiency by ~5-10%.
- Hybrid and electric systems: include i‑MMD/ i‑DCD dual‑motor hybrids, Sport Hybrid SH‑AWD with torque-vectoring, and dedicated EV powertrains.

==== Philosophy ====
Honda's naming of the system as "Earth Dreams" reflects its dual goals of protecting the environment and preserving driving enjoyment. The approach integrates incremental improvements across engines, transmissions, and electrified systems for optimized overall efficiency.

== Hybrid Technologies ==
Honda has developed multiple hybrid systems to improve fuel efficiency and performance across its vehicle lineup. The evolution began with the Integrated Motor Assist (IMA) system in 1999, which used a single electric motor to support the engine, offering mild hybrid functionality. In 2013, Honda introduced the Intelligent Dual-Clutch Drive (i-DCD) system, which added a dual-clutch transmission and enabled full electric drive at low speeds. The same year, the Intelligent Multi-Mode Drive (i-MMD) system was launched, featuring a two-motor setup that seamlessly switches between EV drive, hybrid drive, and engine drive for optimal efficiency. For high-performance applications, Honda developed the Sport Hybrid SH-AWD (Super Handling All-Wheel Drive) system, which combines a V6 engine with three electric motors to deliver both all-wheel drive and torque vectoring capabilities.

=== Integrated Motor Assist ===
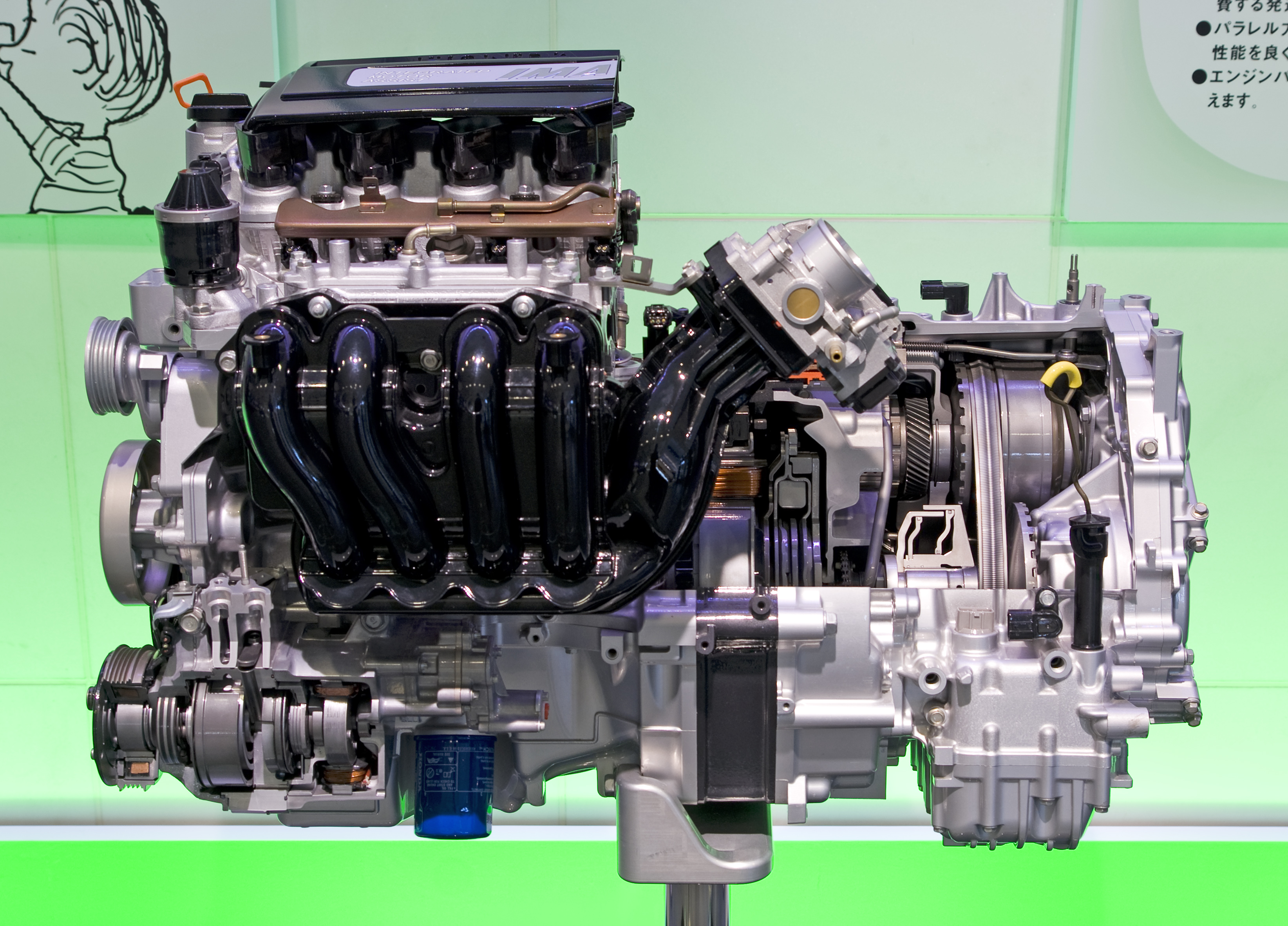
3 stage i-VTEC + IMA

The Integrated Motor Assist, or IMA as it is commonly known, is Honda's hybrid car technology that uses a gasoline-electric drive system developed to achieve higher fuel economy and low exhaust emissions without compromising engine efficiency. The IMA system uses the engine as the main power source and an electric motor as an assisting power during acceleration. It was first designed for the Honda Insight in 1999, which combined the electric motor with a smaller displacement VTEC engine and a lightweight aluminium body with improved aerodynamics. Low emissions target was realized when the car achieved the EU2000. In 2001, the Honda Insight Integrated Motor Assist system was declared "Best New Technology" by the Automobile Journalists Association of Canada (AJAC).

The development of the IMA system is a result of optimizing the various technologies that Honda has built over the years, including the lean-burn combustion, low-emission engines, variable valve timing, high-efficiency electric motors, regenerative braking, nickel-metal hydride (Ni-MH) battery technology and microprocessor control. The target of this integrated system was to meet improvements in several areas:

- Recovery of deceleration energy

With the IMA system, the amount of energy regeneration during deceleration is optimized and friction is reduced. The recovered energy is used to supplement the engine's output during acceleration.

- Reduction of energy displacement

The IMA supports the engine during a low rpm normal driving range by utilizing the electric motor to generate a high-torque performance. When the gasoline engine enters a higher rpm range, the electric motor ceases, and power output is supplied by the VTEC engine. The assistance from the electric motor reduces the work of the gasoline engine, allowing the engine to be downscaled. This results in better mileage and reduces fuel consumption.

- Idle stop system

The power from the electric motor is generated and conserved when the vehicle moves forward. When brakes are applied, the IMA system shuts off the engine and conserved power from the electric motor is utilized. This minimizes vibration of the car body and saves fuel when the engine is idling. When the brakes are released, the electric motor will restart the engine.

==== Among the Honda car models that are using IMA ====
- Honda J-VX (model 1997 concept car)
- Honda Insight (model 1999-2006, 2010:2014)
- Honda Dualnote (model 2001 concept car)
- Honda Civic Hybrid (model 2003-2016)
- Honda Accord Hybrid (model 2005-2007)
- Honda CR-Z (model 2009-2016)

=== Sport Hybrid i‑DCD (Intelligent Dual‑Clutch Drive) ===
Sport Hybrid i‑DCD is Honda's compact, single‑motor parallel-hybrid system introduced in 2013 with the third-generation Fit Hybrid. It marries a 1.5 L Atkinson-cycle i‑VTEC engine with a high-output electric motor integrated into a 7-speed dual-clutch transmission (DCT), providing EV drive, sporty performance, and excellent fuel efficiency. The i‑DCD system was offered primarily in Japan and introduced to Malaysia in 2017, making these the only markets to receive mass-market i‑DCD-equipped models like the Jazz Hybrid, City Hybrid, and HR-V Hybrid.

However, the compact DCT has exhibited overheating and clutch problems under heavy stop-and-go conditions: the actuator (DOT‑4) fluid degrades from heat and moisture, leading to clutch slippage, fluid leaks, and transmission overheat warnings, issues preventable with regular fluid changes every ~20,000 km and transmission oil replacement every ~30-40,000 km. Moreover, in Japan, about 81,000 Fit and Vezel Hybrids produced from July 2013 to February 2014 were recalled due to software glitches in the DCT control unit that caused gear engagement failures, requiring software reflashes and, in some cases, component replacement to resolve start-up delays or non-engagement problems.

==== System Architecture ====
- Hybrid system configuration:
  - 1.5 L Atkinson-cycle LEB-series DOHC i‑VTEC petrol engine
  - 7-speed dual‑clutch transmission with built-in electric motor
  - Lithium-ion battery and Intelligent Power Unit (IPU)
  - Electric servo-brake and fully electric compressor

==== Operation modes ====
1. EV Drive: pure electric from stand-still
2. Hybrid Drive: engine and motor propel via DCT
3. Engine Drive: engine directly drives wheels

==== Among the Honda car models that are using i-DCD ====
- Honda Fit/ Jazz Hybrid (Japan/ Malaysia, 2013-2020)
- Honda Grace/ City Hybrid (Japan/ Malaysia, 2013-2020)
- Honda Vezel/ HR‑V Hybrid (Japan/ Malaysia, 2013-2022)
- Honda Fit Shuttle Hybrid (Japan, 2015-2022)
- Honda Freed Hybrid (Japan, 2016-2024)

=== Sport Hybrid SH‑AWD (Super Handling All‑Wheel Drive) ===
Sport Hybrid SH‑AWD is Honda's advanced torque-vectoring, three-motor AWD series-parallel hybrid system that debuted in the 2014 fifth-generation Legend and 2014 Acura RLX. It combines a petrol engine with three electric motors: one at the front and two at the rear, for superior traction, handling, and performance.

==== System Architecture ====
- Three‑motor layout: A front-mounted electric motor and two independently controlled rear motors (Twin Motor Unit, or TMU) are powered by a lithium-ion battery. The gasoline engine provides propulsion and charges the battery via an integrated generator.
- Torque vectoring: Each rear motor can apply positive or negative torque independently to steer the car through corners. For instance, during corner exit, more torque is directed to the outside rear wheel for agile turn-in; during braking, regenerative braking is applied more aggressively to the inside wheel to enhance yaw control.

==== Operational modes ====
1. Electric Drive (Rear-Motor Only): Powers the vehicle using only the two rear electric motors. Used for low-speed, silent driving and launch acceleration, offering zero tailpipe emissions.
2. Engine Drive (Front-Motor Only): At higher speeds with light loads, the front-mounted electric motor and gasoline engine propel the vehicle, while the rear motors regenerate or sit idle, balancing efficiency and power.
3. Hybrid Drive (All Motors Active): Under hard acceleration or AWD demand, the gasoline engine and all three electric motors (front + both rear) work together to maximize torque, response, and stability .
4. Torque‑Vectoring Regeneration: During cornering and braking, the rear motors apply customized positive or negative torque to each wheel—boosting handling and energy recovery.

==== Performance & Benefits ====
- Handling and stability: The feedforward + feedback torque control ensure stability, agile cornering, and confidence-inspiring behavior both in tight turns and during emergency maneuvers, even on low-friction roads.
- Efficiency and power: In the Legend, the SH‑AWD system combines a 3.5 L V6 engine with three electric motors to produce 382 PS (281 kW), delivering V8-level acceleration with fuel consumption similar to a 4‑cylinder engine (16.8 km/L, JC08 cycle) .
- NSX performance: The second-generation NSX leverages this system with a TMU plus a front Direct Drive Motor, enabling yaw control even at low throttle-off conditions. This achieves remarkable linear acceleration and stability. The NSX produces 581 PS and 646 Nm, with a 0:100 km/h time of 3.3 s.

==== Among the Honda/ Acura car models that are using Sport Hybrid SH-AWD ====
- Honda Legend (2014)
- Acura RLX Sport Hybrid (2014-2020)
- Acura MDX Sport Hybrid (2017-2020)
- Acura NSX (2016-2022)

=== Sport Hybrid i‑MMD (Intelligent Multi‑Mode Drive)/ e:HEV ===
Honda's Sport Hybrid i‑MMD (also called e:HEV in latter date) is Honda's second‑generation, two‑motor series-parallel hybrid powertrain system introduced in June 2013 with the Honda Accord Hybrid. It combines a petrol engine, two electric motors (a drive motor and a generator motor), and a lithium‑ion battery to offer smooth, efficient, and intelligent hybrid operation. The system has evolved into several versions, optimized for different vehicle classes, from compact hatchbacks to mid-size SUV, by varying motor output, battery capacity, and transmission tuning to suit each application.

==== System Architecture ====
- Series‑parallel hybrid layout: At low speeds or during light acceleration, the system operates in Electric Drive, where the drive motor draws electricity from the battery to power the wheels. During moderate loads or acceleration, Hybrid Drive engage, the petrol engine powers the generator motor, which creates electricity to drive the wheels and/or recharge the battery. At steady highway speeds, a clutch connects the engine directly to the wheels in Engine Drive mode.
- Two-motor configuration:
  - Drive Motor: Propels the vehicle.
  - Generator Motor: Charges the battery and can restart the engine.
- These motors are controlled by a Power Control Unit (PCU) that handles electricity flow and cooling via an ATF-cooling loop.

==== Operational modes ====
1. Electric Drive: Pure electric propulsion at low speeds. Quiet, zero direct CO_{2} emissions, with typical range of ~2 km depending on conditions.
2. Hybrid Drive: The engine acts as a generator powering the drive motor and may recharge the battery during acceleration or moderate loads.
3. Engine Drive: At cruising speeds, engine power is routed directly to the wheels via a mechanical clutch for maximum efficiency.

==== Development and evolution ====
- 2014: Honda launched the first i‑MMD system with the Accord Hybrid, featuring conventional round‑wire stators, exclusively paired with Honda's LF series 2.0 L Atkinson-cycle petrol engine.
- 2016: With the Odyssey Hybrid, Honda introduced an advanced winding technique, making the motor ~24 % smaller, 23% lighter, and 37% cheaper than the original.
- 2017: The Clarity Plug‑in Hybrid (2018 model year), marked the debut of the 1.5 L LEB series Atkinson‑cycle engine paired with the i‑MMD system.
- 2019: With the release of Honda Fit (2020 model year), Honda unified its hybrid models under the e:HEV branding for most markets (excluding America), consolidating the i‑MMD lineup.
- 2023: The 2.0 L e:HEV system was updated to a 4th-generation design, first seen on the CR‑V (2023 model year), featuring a compact parallel motor layout, stronger magnets, and a dual-gear setup, with an additional low range engine gear, allowing higher torque, better efficiency, and improved towing and city driving. This parallel motor layout is also adopted in the latest Accord, while the Civic shares the same design but retains an in-line motor configuration, better suited to its compact platform.

==== Among the Honda car models that are using i-MMD/ e:HEV ====
- Honda Insight (2018-2022)
- Honda Clarity PHEV (2018-2021)
- Honda Fit e:HEV (Asia/ Europe, since 2020)
- Honda City e:HEV (Asia, since 2020)
- Honda Vezel/HR‑V e:HEV (Asia/ Europe, since 2021)
- Honda Stepwgn Hybrid (Japan, since 2017)
- Honda Odyssey Hybrid (Asia, since 2016)
- Honda Accord Hybrid (since 2013)
- Honda CR-V Hybrid (since 2020)
- Honda ZR-V (since 2022)
- Honda Civic e:HEV (since 2022)

== Vehicle Safety Technologies ==
=== Safety ===
Honda operates two crash test laboratories to improve safety designs and technologies in their vehicles, resulting in the cars scoring five-star ratings in front and side crash tests. A new independent crash test report from Euro NCAP also assessed the 2009 Honda Accord, Honda Civic and Honda Jazz as among Europe's safest cars, with an overall five-star rating.

=== Vehicle Stability Assist ===
The Vehicle Stability Assist (VSA) was introduced by Honda to its vehicles in 1997. The term is Honda's version of Electronic Stability Control (ESC), an active safety feature developed to correct oversteer and understeer by using several sensors to detect loss of steering control and traction while simultaneously braking individual wheels to help the vehicle regain stability.

==== How VSA works ====
VSA combines the Anti-lock Braking System (ABS) and Traction Control System (TCS) with side-slip control to help stabilize the vehicle whenever it turns more or less than desired. ABS is an existing system that prevents the vehicle's wheels from locking up under braking, especially in slippery road conditions. For the ABS to work, the system relies on the computed input from a steering angle sensor to monitor the driver's steering direction, the yaw sensor to detect the momentum of which the wheels are steering (yaw rate), and a lateral acceleration (g-force) sensor to signal the changes in speed. At the same time, the TCS will prevent wheel slip during acceleration while the side-slip control stabilizes cornering when the rear or front wheels slip sideways (during oversteer and understeer).

Controlling oversteer - During oversteer, the rear end of the vehicle will spin out because the rotational speed of the rear wheels exceeds the front wheels. VSA will prevent the vehicle from spinning by braking the outer front wheel to produce an outward moment and stabilize the vehicle.

Controlling understeer - During understeer, the front wheels lose traction during cornering due to excessive throttle and this causes the speed difference between the left and front wheels to decrease. When the vehicle steers outwards from the intended trajectory, VSA intervenes by reducing engine power and if necessary, also braking the inner front wheel.

=== G-CON ===
Honda's G-CON technology aims to protect car occupants by controlling G-forces during a collision. Such collision safety is a result of specific impact absorption by the vehicle's body and frame.

==== How G-Con works ====
The structure of the car body is designed to absorb and disperse crash energy throughout the energy compartment. When impact absorption is maximised, the cabin intrusion is automatically minimised to effectively lessen injuries to both occupants and pedestrians.

To optimize front collision performance and reduce the impact when different sized vehicles collide, the G-CON technology is further developed to incorporate Advanced Compatibility Engineering, Honda's term for crash compatibility. Honda has announced that by 2009, the ACE will be a standard feature in all their passenger cars, regardless of size or price.

G-CON is also designed to improve pedestrian safety by minimizing head and chest injuries of the pedestrian during an accident. The company introduced an advanced test dummy, Polar III, which represents the human body and is equipped with sensors to measure the impact of energy on a human body during a car accident. The data obtained has been used to explore pedestrian safety by improving the design of the vehicles.

=== Super Handling All‑Wheel Drive (SH‑AWD) ===
SH‑AWD (Super Handling All‑Wheel Drive) is Honda/ Acura's proprietary advanced AWD system, blending dynamic traction and torque vectoring for enhanced stability, handling, and safety. Originally introduced in 2005 on the Acura RL and fourth-generation Honda Legend, it remains a cornerstone of Acura's performance-driven platforms.

==== How It Works ====
- Front‑Rear Torque Distribution: Continuously adjusts torque split between the front and rear axles, varying from 70:30 to 30:70 depending on conditions. This dynamic distribution ensures optimal traction and performance under a variety of scenarios
- Torque Vectoring: Directs up to 100% of rear-axle torque to the outer rear wheel during cornering, creating an inward yaw moment for sharper turn-in and reduced understeer.
- Preemptive Control: Utilizes feed-forward inputs, steering angle, lateral G, yaw rate, wheel speeds to predict and respond to vehicle dynamics proactively. This feed-forward strategy enhances steering responsiveness and stability

=== Honda Sensing/ Acura Watch ===
Honda Sensing/ Acura Watch is a suite of intelligent safety and driver-assist technologies designed to enhance the driver's situational awareness and, in some cases, intervene to help avoid or mitigate a collision. First announced in October 2014 for the new Legend, introducing it as part of their global goal for a collision‑free society. It then became available in production models like the 2015 CR‑V Touring (model year), and by September 2015 it was offered across all trims of the 2016 Civic and Accord.

==== How Honda Sensing/ Acura Watch works ====
The system uses a combination of cameras and radar sensors to monitor the vehicle's surroundings and includes the following key features:

- Collision Mitigation Braking System (CMBS): Detects the risk of a frontal collision with a vehicle or pedestrian and can automatically apply brake pressure to reduce the severity of an impact or avoid it entirely.
- Road Departure Mitigation System (RDM): Detects if the vehicle is about to leave the roadway unintentionally and can provide steering assistance or braking to keep it in the lane.
- Adaptive Cruise Control (ACC): Maintains a preset following distance from the vehicle ahead, automatically adjusting speed as needed.
- Lane Keeping Assist System (LKAS): Detects lane markings and can provide steering input to help keep the vehicle centered in the detected lane.
- Traffic Sign Recognition (TSR): Uses a camera to recognize road signs and displays important information such as speed limits on the driver's display.
- Lead Car Departure Notification (in newer models): Alerts the driver when the vehicle in front starts moving after a stop.

Honda has since extended the system with advanced variants:

- Honda Sensing 360 (introduced in 2021): Adds omnidirectional radar for 360° coverage, enabling functions like Front Cross‑Traffic Warning and Lane Change Collision Mitigation.
- Honda Sensing Elite (flagship variant): Introduced with Traffic Jam Pilot for Level 3 autonomous driving, plus hands-off lane control and driver monitoring.
- Global Rollout Goals: Honda aims to offer Sensing 360 (and Elite where applicable) across all major markets by 2030, aligning with its mission to halve global traffic collision fatalities by that year.

== Transmission Technologies ==
=== Parallel‑shaft Automatic Transmission ===
Honda's early automatic transmissions, including the H5 (2000–2015) and its successor, the H6 (introduced around 2010) are notable for their parallel-shaft, constant‑mesh design, setting them apart from the conventional planetary-gear automatics used by most other manufacturers. The H6 builds upon the H5's architecture by adding a sixth gear while retaining the parallel-shaft layout, multi-plate hydraulic clutches, and torque converter. Featuring four shafts tightened via bolt structures, it is slightly more compact (~18 mm shorter) than the H5, yet capable of handling higher input torque and delivering approximately 5% better fuel efficiency due to improved hydraulic controls, reduced friction, and an enhanced multi-plate lock-up clutch. Like its predecessor, the H6 preserves strong engine braking, compact packaging, and a manual-like shift feel.

However, Honda's peculiar parallel‑shaft automatic design faced inherent limitations that ultimately prompted a shift toward planetary and CVT architectures. With each additional gear requiring its own dedicated shaft and hydraulic clutch pack, the H-series transmissions became increasingly bulky and heavy, unlike compact multi‑speed planetary automatics, which add ratios without substantial growth in size or mass. Moreover, the complexity of incorporating more than six speeds into this design hit a practical ceiling, as new gears invariably increased weight, size, and hydraulic control complexity. These architecture-driven drawbacks, alongside mounting consumer demand for higher gear counts and efficiency, led Honda first to offer the ZF 9‑speed automatic for select models (Acura TLX V6, MDX, Odyssey, Pilot, Ridgeline) beginning in 2014.

=== Continuously Variable Transmission (CVT) with G‑Design Shift ===
Honda's new CVT is part of the new suite of Earth Dreams Technology developments. Introduced in 2012 for mid-sized vehicles, it uses a metal belt and variable-width pulleys to provide seamless, stepless gear ratios for smooth acceleration and improved fuel efficiency. To address the typical "rubber-band" feel, Honda implemented G‑Design Shift, a control system that coordinates engine revs, throttle input, and hydraulic pressure to simulate traditional gear shifts and enhance driving engagement.

=== Dual‑Clutch Transmission (DCT): Motorcycles ===
Honda introduced its DCT in 2010 on the VFR1200F, marking the first dual-clutch system in a production large-displacement motorcycle. Developed further, it was adopted on the NC700/750 series (2012+), CRF1000L Africa Twin (2016), and Gold Wing (2018).

The system uses two concentric clutch packs, one for odd gears (1,3,5), one for even (2,4,6), allowing pre-selection for rapid, seamless shifts with minimal torque interruption. Riders can switch among Manual, Drive, and Sport modes, selecting gears via handlebar paddles or letting the system manage shifting.

=== 8‑Speed Dual‑Clutch Transmission (8DCT): Cars ===
Introduced in 2014 for models like the Acura TLX and ILX, Honda's 8DCT was the first DCT to integrate a torque converter. This hybrid setup combines the rapid, seamless shifts of a dual-clutch with the low-speed smoothness of a traditional automatic. Notably, the Honda Spirior remains the only Honda-branded model to feature the 8DCT, as most other applications appeared under the Acura nameplate. The Acura CDX, sold exclusively in China, was the last production vehicle to utilize the 8DCT before Honda phased it out in favor of newer CVT and 10-speed automatic units.

An official service bulletin from April 2015 confirms that the 2015 Acura TLX's 8-speed DCT "slips or shifts hard when cold, usually on 1st to 2nd upshifts," and may deliver a noticeable bump or jerk when coming to a stop. These symptoms typically resolve once the transmission warms up. While more complex than conventional automatics, the 8DCT is considered reliable with proper maintenance.

=== 10‑Speed Automatic Transmission (10AT) ===
Honda's first in-house 10-speed automatic is a planetary-gear design developed by Honda R&D produced in Georgia (HPPG) and Ohio (HTM) from 2017. Featuring compact construction and paddle-shifters, the 10AT delivers up to 14% quicker acceleration, 30% faster shifts, and lower noise compared to its 6-speed predecessor. Its design features include a four-planetary-gearset layout with seven engagement elements, resulting from over a trillion simulated configurations and optimized packaging using a 2-way clutch and an integrated internal/external gear, saving several inches of space and reducing parasitic losses. It debuted in the 2018 Odyssey and later in models like the Accord, Pilot, RDX, TLX, and RLX.

=== Manual Transmissions ===
Honda's manual gearboxes, notably in performance models such as the Civic Type R and S2000, are revered for their crisp shift feel and mechanical precision. This is attributed to robust synchronizers, rigid transmission linkages, and tight manufacturing tolerance, which are engineered to create a gratifying connection between driver and machine. Enthusiast feedback underscores this reputation:

"they're a rod straight down into the gearbox... shift feel has always been a focus at Honda"

== Advanced mobility ==
Honda also ventures into advanced mobility research where the findings were used to create ASIMO (Advanced Step in Innovative Mobility), the world's first humanoid robot, as well as Honda's first venture into flight mobility on 3 December 2003, which is HondaJet.

=== ASIMO ===
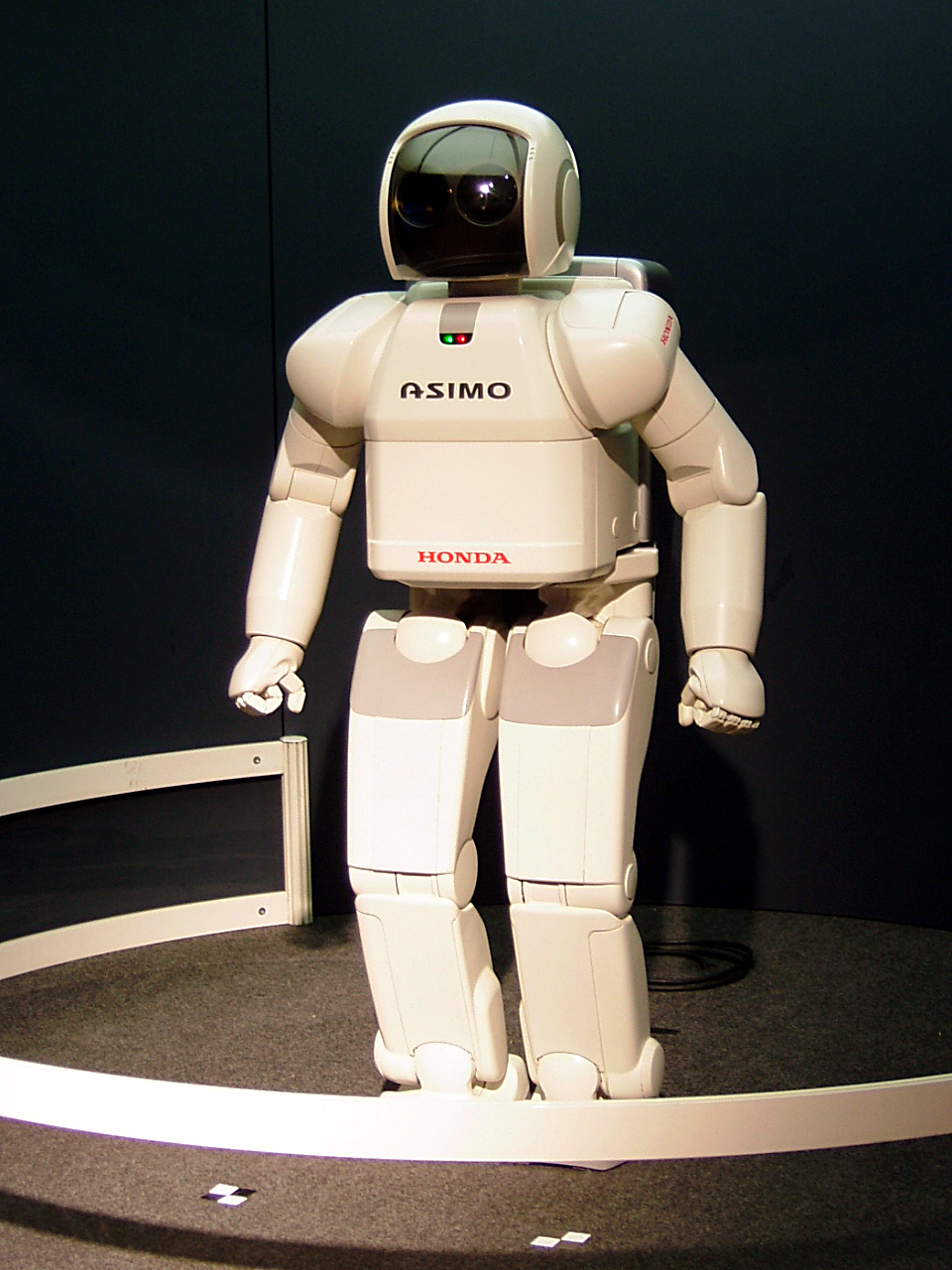
ASIMO at the Expo 2005

ASIMO, derived from Advanced Step in Innovative Mobility, is pronounced ashimo. It was originally a research and development program undertaken by Honda's associates to challenge the field of mobility. The advancement of the research prompted Honda to conceive a humanoid robot capable of interacting with humans and is able to function in society, such as supporting the disabled and elderly.

ASIMO started as a pair of mechanical legs and had been in development for over 20 years. E0, the first prototype, debuted in 1986 and evolved into prototype E7 in 1991. By 1993, the prototypes progressed to slightly more man-like walking robots. P1 was introduced in 1993, and subsequently P2 and P3 were presented in 1996 and 1997. The P3 robot was a gawky prototype standing at 160 cm tall and weighed 130 kg.

In 2000, ASIMO was unveiled as a robot with real-time, flexible walking technology which enables it to walk, run, climb and descend stairs. It is also built in with sound, face, posture, environment and movement recognition technology, and could even respond to Internet connectivity to report news and the weather.

By 2004, Honda announced new technologies that target a higher level of mobility which enabled the next-gen ASIMO to function and interact with people more naturally. The new technologies introduced include:

- Posture control technology: Walking speed was increased from 1.6 km/h to 2.5 km/h while running speed increased to 3 km/h. This is aided by a newly developed high-speed processing circuit, highly responsive and high power motor drive unit in addition to a lightweight and highly rigid leg structure. The accuracy and response rate is four times faster than the previous model, matching the equivalent speed of a person jogging.
- Autonomous Continuous Movement technology - This allows ASIMO to manoeuvre without stopping as it obtains information about its surrounding from its floor surface sensor. The floor surface sensor and visual sensors located in its head can detect obstacles so that ASIMO can autonomously change its path and avoid hitting humans or other potential hazards.
- Enhanced visual and force sensor technologies: The sensors are added to the wrists so ASIMO can move in sync with people and coordinate its movements to give and receive objects. It can also move forward or backward in response to the direction that its hand is pulled or pushed

With 2005's ASIMO model, Honda added advanced level of physical capabilities that allows ASIMO to operate in real-life environments and in sync with people. The new ASIMO weighed 54 kg and stood at 130 cm tall. It could carry objects using a cart, walk with a person while holding hands, perform the tasks of a receptionist, carry out delivery service and be an information guide. In addition to enhanced visual sensors, floor surface sensors and ultrasonic sensors, Honda developed an IC (Teleinteraction Communication Card) which allows ASIMO to recognize the location and identity of the person who is standing within a 360-degree range. The IC card is held by the person with whom ASIMO interacts. Its mobility was also significantly improved, making it capable of running at 6 km/h and in circular pattern.

By 2007, Honda updated ASIMO with improved intelligence technology that enabled it to operate more autonomously. It could now walk to the nearest charging station to recharge its battery when its power falls under a certain level, and is also capable of choosing its movement when approaching people, whether stepping back or negotiate the right of way.

Honda was also determined to focus its area of research in intelligence capabilities, particularly in developing a technology that uses brain signals to control a robot's movements. By 2009, Honda announced that it has developed a new system, the Brain Machine Interface, which allows human to send commands to ASIMO through thought alone. The first-of-its-kind technology uses electroencephalography (EEG) and near-infrared spectroscopy to record brain activity, combined with a newly developed information-extraction technology to link the analysis and command ASIMO to move. An electronic helmet is developed to allow humans to control the robot just by thinking about making the movement. This was demonstrated by scientists at the Honda Research Institute, who showed that it took only a few seconds for thought to be translated into robotic action. The technology is still under development and is not yet ready for general use.

ASIMO models have been shown at motor shows, schools, science events, and engineering events. To demonstrate its latest capabilities, ASIMO introduced the versatility of the new Honda Insight at the 2009 Geneva Motor Show. It completed 54 rounds of 15-minute public performances over 13 days, running, walking and interacting with the crowd.
