= Acura RLX =

Mid-size luxury car by Acura (2014-2020)

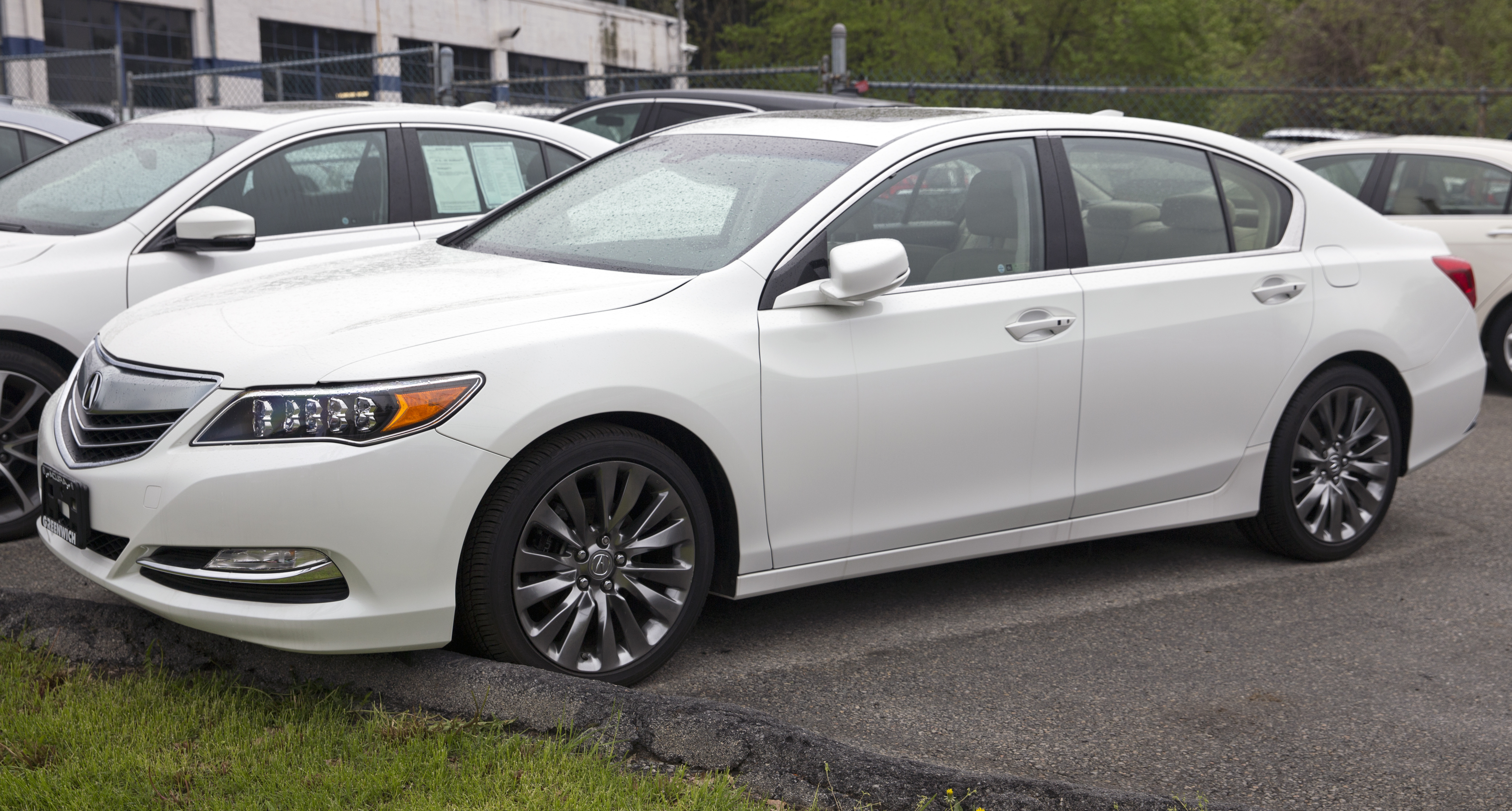
- 2017 Acura RLX

Overview
- Manufacturer: Honda
- Model code: KC1/2
- Also called: Honda Legend (Japan)
- Production: December 2012 – June 2020
- Model years: 2014–2020
- Assembly: Japan: Sayama, Saitama (Sayama Plant)
- Designer: Hideaki Uchino (2009); Michelle Christensen

Body and chassis
- Class: Executive car (E)
- Body style: 4-door sedan
- Layout: FF / F4 layout (SH-AWD)
- Platform: Honda D-5

Powertrain
- Engine: 3.5 L Earth Dreams J35Y4 V6
- Electric motor: 3x Permanent-magnet synchronous AC motors (1x 47 hp Front + 2x 36 hp Rears: Sport Hybrid SH-AWD)
- Transmission: FWD: (RLX only); 6-speed automatic (2014-17); 10-speed automatic (2018–2020); Hybrid AWD: 7-Speed DCT Motor-Integrated
- Battery: Li-Ion

Dimensions
- Wheelbase: 2,850 mm (112.2 in)
- Length: 4,982 mm (196.1 in) (2014 - 2018); 5,032 mm (198.1 in) (2018–2020)
- Width: 1,890 mm (74.4 in)
- Height: 1,465 mm (57.7 in); 1,480 mm (58.3 in) (Legend)
- Curb weight: 1,800–1,816 kg (3,968–4,004 lb); 1,956–1,977 kg (4,312–4,359 lb) (AWD); 1,990 kg (4,387 lb) (Legend)

Chronology
- Predecessor: Acura RL

The Acura RLX is a mid-size luxury car manufactured by Honda and produced under their Acura division since March 2013 for the 2014 model year, replacing the RL. The RLX was discontinued in 2020 after the 2020 model year.

== Background and development ==
In October 2009, Car and Driver blog cited a dinner with Acura executives who acknowledged that the introduction of the new, larger, and in some guises, more powerful, fourth generation Acura TL made it difficult to market the then-current RL. In November 2009, an Autoweek article reported that new Honda CEO Takanobu Ito told Automotive News that Acura is going to change course. Speaking of the worldwide economy before the collapse of investment bank Lehman Brothers, Ito said through an interpreter, "Pre-Lehman, we did have the idea to produce more multicylinder engines... I see the future of Acura as a merger of BMW and Audi -- something between high performance and high technology." As a result of this midstream change, Acura will be in a "low-growth period of developing new products," Ito said. "We were thinking that we could come up with glamorous, gorgeous products that would sell. Now, our premium products will be expressed in advanced environmental technologies, rather than glamorous things attached to the product," he said.

=== RLX Concept ===
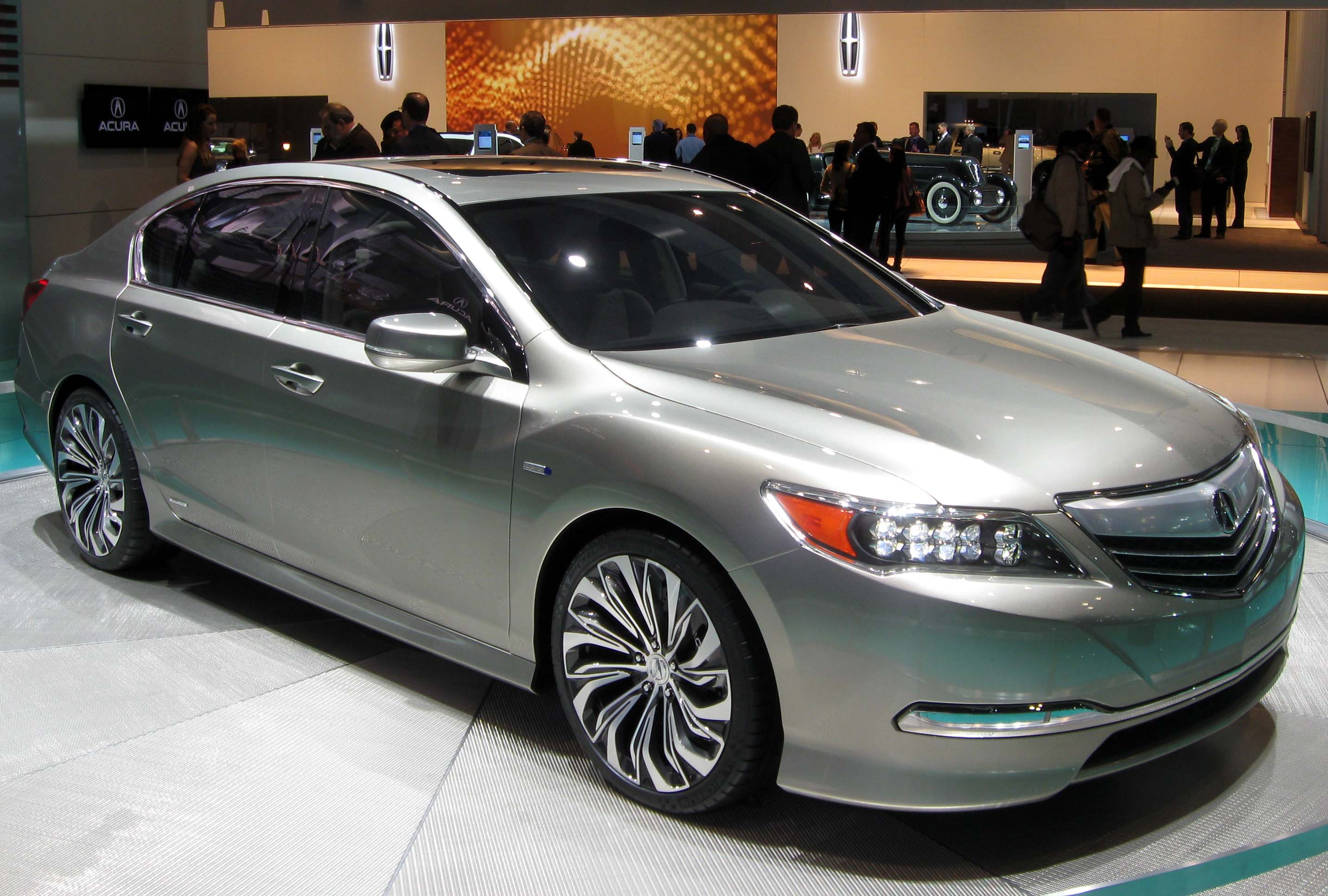
2012 Acura RLX concept

On April 4, 2012, Acura unveiled the RLX Concept, a replacement for the RL sedan, at the 2012 New York International Auto Show. The production model, which changed little from the concept, was unveiled globally at the Los Angeles Auto Show later that year.

== History ==
Production of the Acura RL ended at the Saitama facility on June 16, 2012, to begin factory changeover to the RLX. The RLX was offered for sale beginning on March 15, 2013 for the 2014 model year. The RLX is offered in two versions, a front-wheel drive base model equipped with four-wheel steering system, marketed as Precision-All Wheel Steer (P-AWS), and a hybrid variant of the Super Handling-All Wheel Drive (SH-AWD) as Acura's flagship.

=== RLX Sport Hybrid ===
The RLX Sport Hybrid debuted at the 2013 Los Angeles Auto Show. Overall vehicle weight was up 357 lbs, with weight distribution (front:rear) improved from 61:39 in non-hybrids to 57:43 in hybrid models. It was offered as the Honda Legend in Japan. US sales began during September 2014, with 250 models produced for the 2014 model year and an additional 250 models produced in 2015 for the 2016 model year.

=== Powertrain ===
A direct injected 3.5-liter Earth Dreams V6 gasoline engine using VTEC and Variable Cylinder Management (VCM) marketed as i-VTEC like other J-series Honda engines. It is paired with a 6-speed automatic received an EPA-estimated fuel economy of 20/30/23 mpg (city/highway/combined) and the maximum output was 310 hp (231 kW) at 6,500 rpm and 272 lb⋅ft (369 N⋅m) of torque at 4,500 rpm. The VCM system was updated to worked in either 6 or 3 cylinder configurations; the new model used more sophisticated engine mounts which bypassed the need for a 4-cylinder mode which would result in a lower NVH.

Hybrid models featured the VCM capability as well, with an added start-stop system to boost fuel economy as well as the ability to operate entirely on electric power up to 58 miles per hour with light throttle usage. The hybrid also used a 7-speed dual clutch transmission using an integrated 35 kilowatts (47 hp) electric motor, with each rear wheel being powered by a 27 kilowatts (36 hp) electric motor, with 2 rear electric motors total. This setup gave the hybrid a torque vectoring all-wheel drive system with rear wheels strictly electrically powered.

A 72-cell 1.3 kWh 66-pound lithium-ion battery pack was placed behind the rear seat. Total system power output on hybrid was rated at 377 hp (281 kW) at 6,500 rpm and 341 lb⋅ft (462 N⋅m) of torque at 4,700 rpm. EPA estimated fuel economy was improved to 29/30/29 mpg (city/highway/combined). It was given a CARB emissions rating of LEV III SULEV30 compared with the non-hybrid's ULEV-2 ranking.

=== Chassis ===
The front subframe was made from aluminum. Front suspension used a double wishbone layout, while the rear was a multi-link. ZF Sachs (ZF) supplied the "Amplitude Reactive Dampers" with two piston valves per damper. 18-inch wheels were standard, and 19-inch wheels with a noise reducing harmonic construction feature were optional for non-hybrids and standard on hybrids, a feature similar to that used in the previous face-lifted 2011 Acura RL. Suspension tuning was oriented towards the sportier side of comfort.

=== Interior ===
Standard perforated leather 12-way (4-way lumbar) front seats were heated and, on the "Advance" option package models, cooled, and rear seat room had been significantly improved. Rear legroom was similar to full size luxury flagship sedans (non-extended wheelbase versions). An 8-inch navigation screen along with a 7-inch touch screen display for audio, climate, and various shortcut controls with AcuraLink were also standard.

An optional flagship 14-speaker Krell audio system replaced the Bose system used on the previous model RL. A mid-level 14-speaker ELS Studio Premium system using Panasonic components was also optional. The base ELS Premium system used 10-speakers.

Hybrid models included an electronic transmission gear selector, heads-up display, acoustic PVB layered glass for all doors and the windshield, and standard navigation. The 14-speaker ELS Studio Premium system was standard, and the Krell system was optional. GPS-linked climate control, voice recognition, and a keyless access system with a push-button start were also standard.

=== Exterior ===
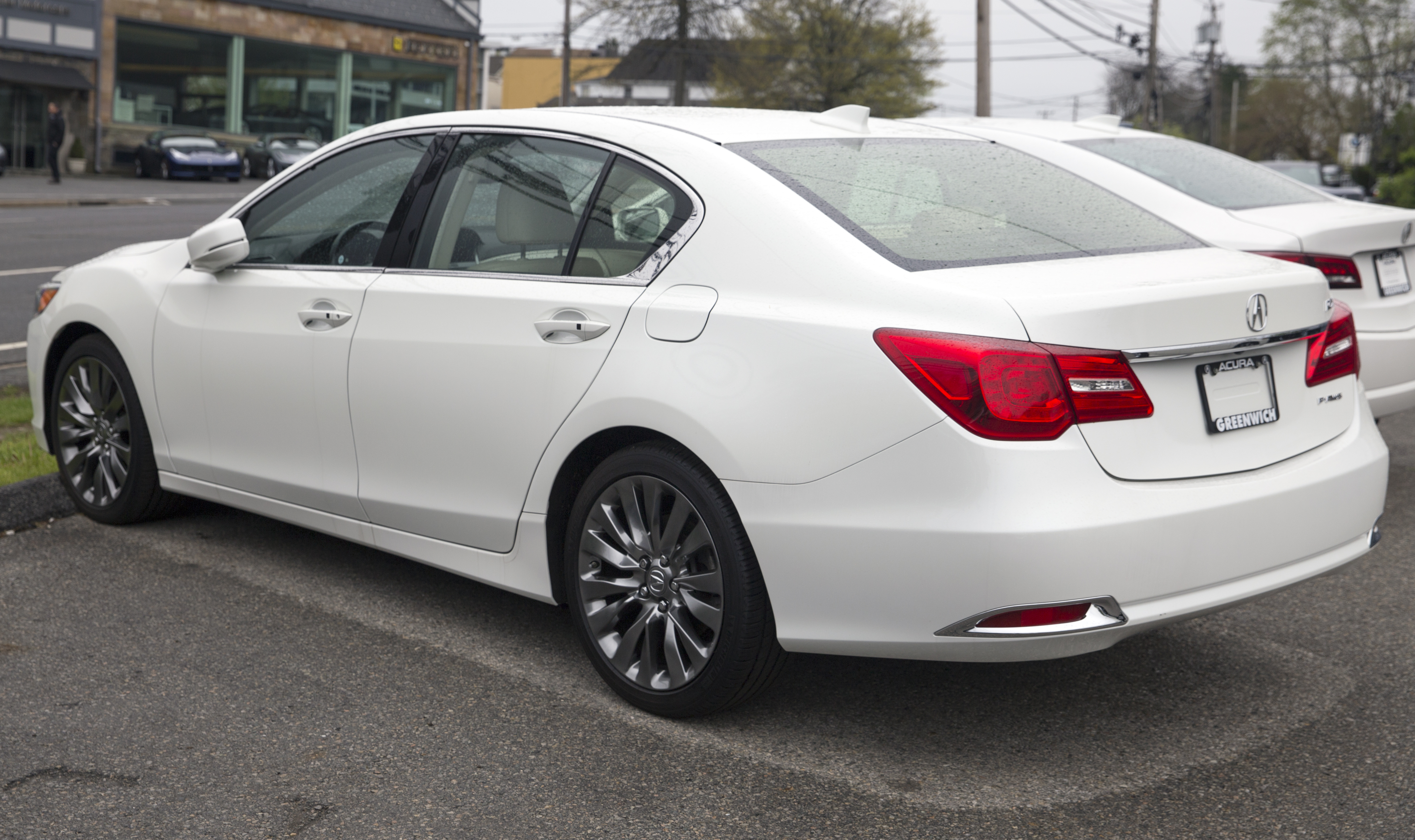
2017 Acura RLX (rear view)

The RLX was the first Acura model to offer standard Jewel-Eye LED headlamps. Each unit uses five separate LED light sources (four low beam, one high beam) with ten polished lenses (eight low beam, two high beam). The headlights no longer swivel through corners as they did on the previous generation RL. The hood, front fenders, and outer door panels are made from aluminum, aluminum use in the RLX saved a total of 79.1 lbs compared with steel components. The alloy wheels were updated to a darker-gray finish for 2016 and 2017 model year.

=== Safety ===
All models came standard with a multi-angle rear-view backup camera, Forward Collision Warning system (FCW) and lane departure warning. An automatic braking front precrash system with front seatbelt electronic pretensioners was available, as was a lane keeping assist system and adaptive cruise control. Optional Adaptive Cruise Control with Low-Speed Follow, Blind Spot Information System and automotive head-up display were available. For 2016, a Surround View camera system was made optional.

Brakes with Brake Hold Control holding the car at a stop without the use of a brake pedal, Electronic Brake Distribution, Brake Assist, an Agile Handling Assist that applies the brakes on the wheels inside a curve, and Vehicle Stability Assist were standard.

IIHS scores
Moderate overlap frontal offset	Good
Small overlap frontal offset	Good^{1}
Side impact	Good
Roof strength	Good^{2}

^{1} vehicle structure also rated "Good"
^{2} strength-to-weight ratio: 5.18

2015 RLX NHTSA scores
Overall:	5/5 stars
Frontal Driver:	5/5 stars
Frontal Passenger:	5/5 stars
Side Driver:	5/5 stars
Side Passenger:	5/5 stars
Side Pole Driver:	5/5 stars
Rollover:	/ 9.7%

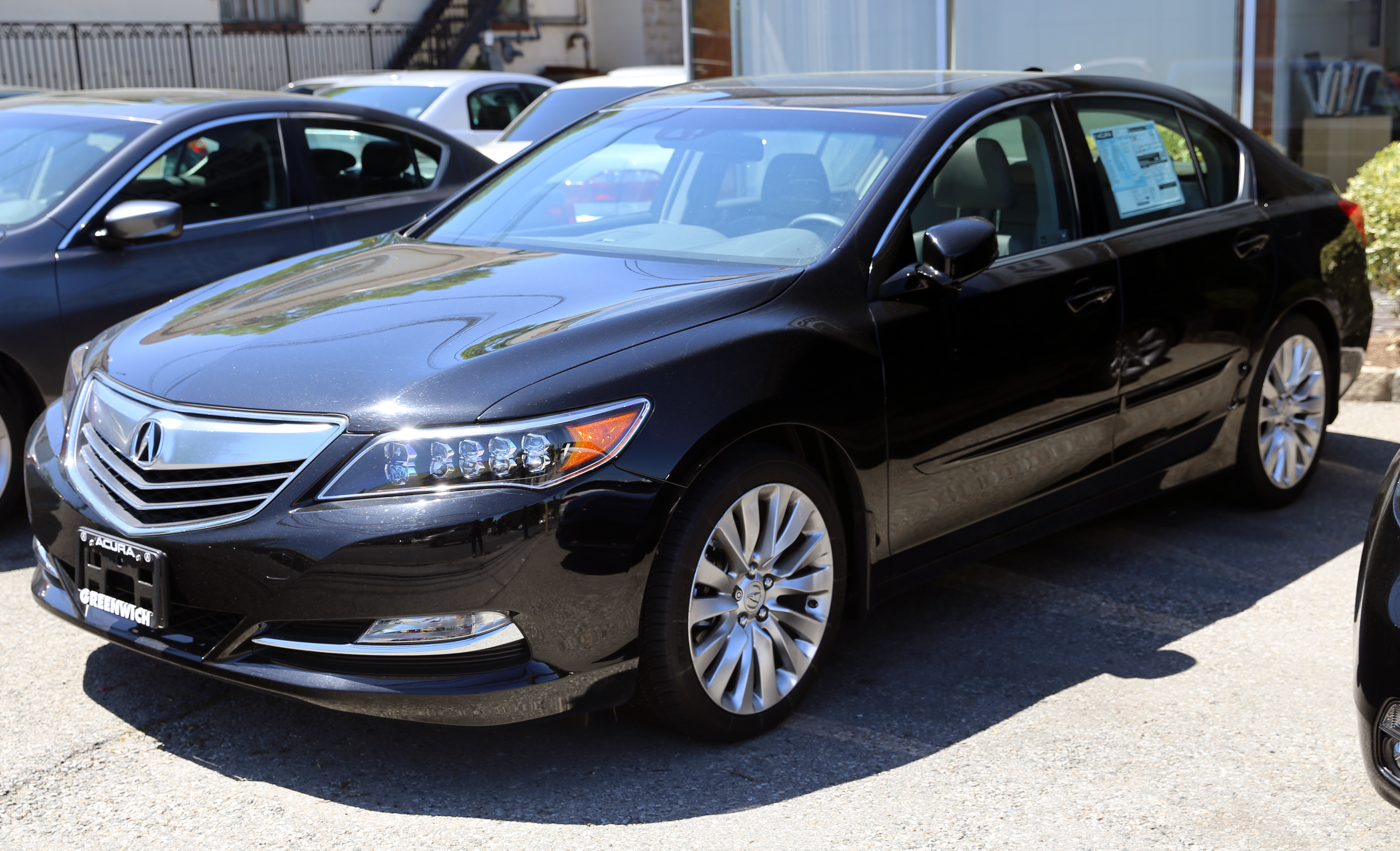
2014 Acura RLX

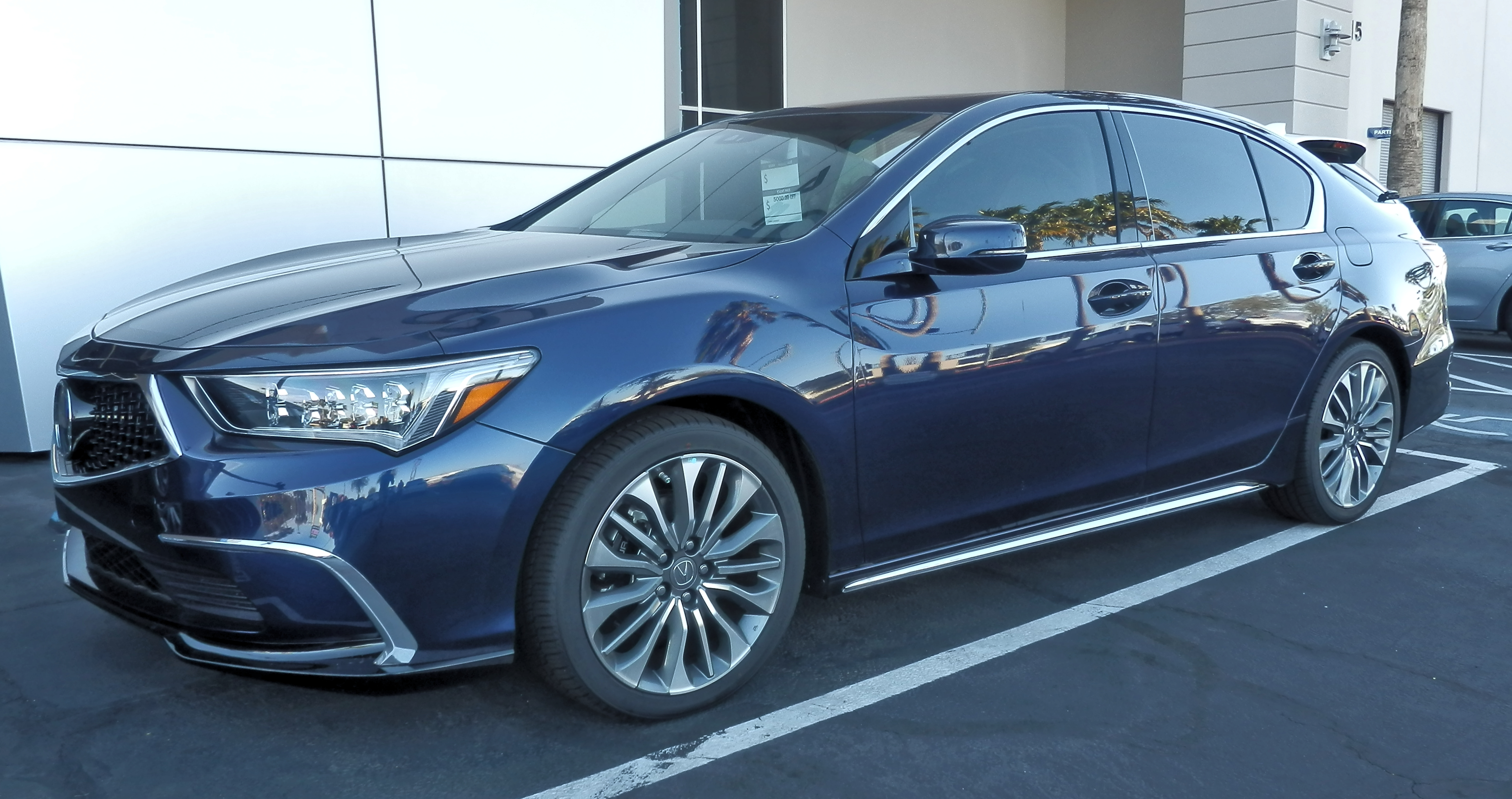

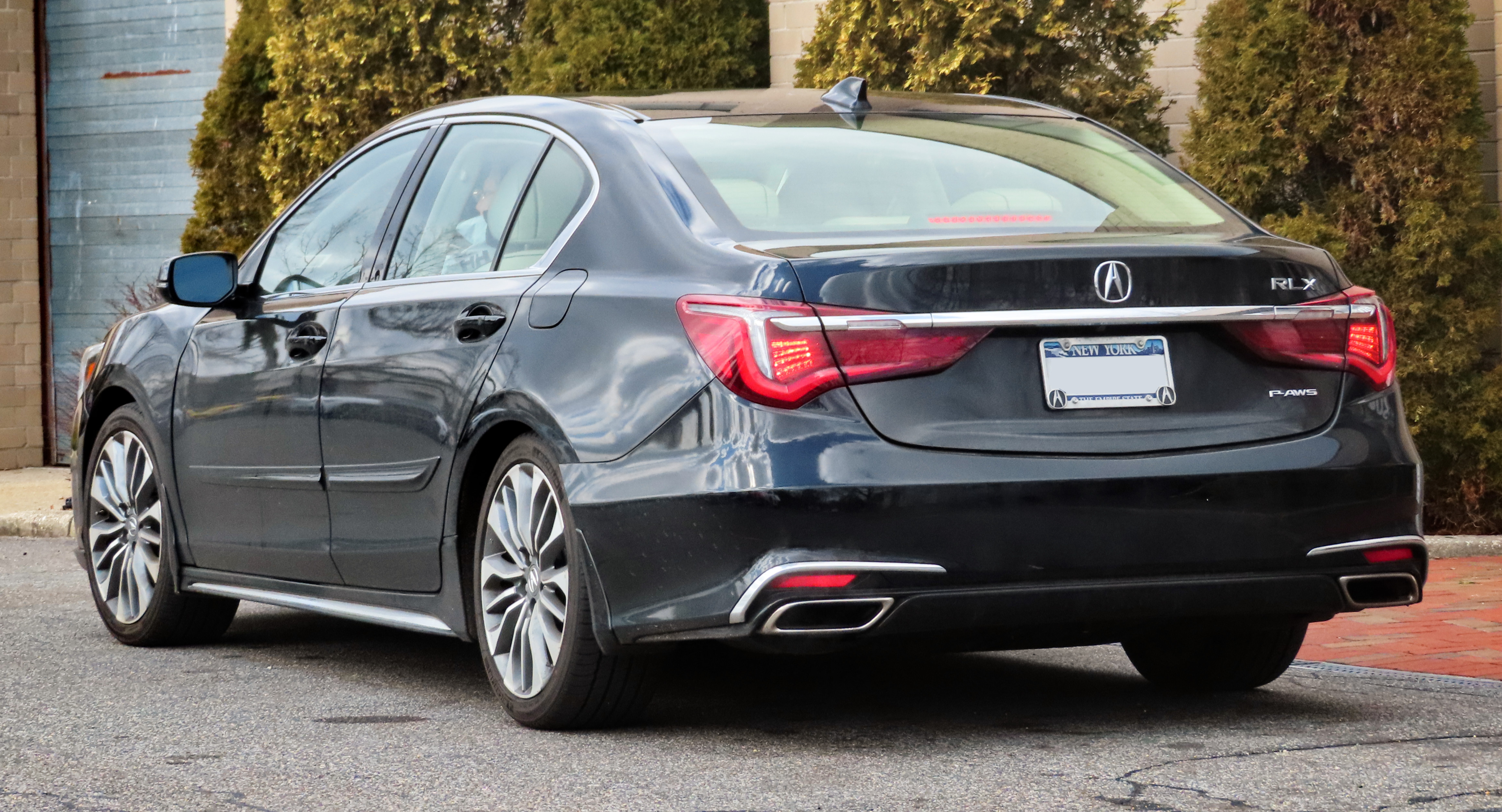
Facelift 2018 Acura RLX

=== 2018 Facelift ===
For the 2018 model year, two trims options were available, the base front-wheel drive RLX, and the RLX Sport Hybrid with SH-AWD. US sales began in November 2017. The updated RLX incorporated Acura's new design language featuring its diamond pentagon grille, redesigned front and rear fascias, redesigned LED tail lights, LED head lights, a redesigned hood, chrome exhaust finishers, and new wheel design for base and hybrid variant. Changes to the interior had been made, including a new front seat design, steering wheel, wood trim, and an added Espresso interior color option. RLX featured AcuraWatch suite of safety features as standard, including an Acura's first Traffic Jam Assist and blind spot monitoring. The base model received a new 10-speed automatic transmission, and a reduced in battery size for hybrid model. The length grew to 5,032 mm (198.1 in), becoming the longest Honda/Acura sedan to date and the first to exceed 5 metres (16 ft 5 in).

=== Discontinuation ===
2020 was the final model year for the RLX as the market shifted towards SUVs and crossovers. As a result, the TLX became Acura's flagship sedan. Although similar in appearance, the RLX was larger than the TLX. The 2021 TLX then took a position in Acura's lineup as "the quickest, best-handling and most well-appointed [Acura] sedan".

The Honda Legend, upon which the RLX was based, was initially continued on in other markets, including Japan. In June 2021, it was announced that the Legend would be discontinued at the end of that production year.

== Sales ==
Calendar year	Total US sales	Total Canada sales	Total Mexico sales
2013	5,014	53	59
2014	3,413	243	8
2015	2,195	182	8
2016	1,478	107	
2017	1,237	59	
2018	1,931	64	
2019	1,019	55	
2020	1,054	23	
2021	214	2	
2022	3		
