= POLAR III =

POLAR III is a pedestrian test dummy created by Honda.

The dummy is used to study how pedestrians are injured or killed when hit by automobiles. POLAR III has instruments to measure the level of injury throughout the body.

About 5,000 pedestrians are killed in traffic accidents each year in the United States. By studying test dummy results and designing cars in such a way as to protect pedestrians as much as possible in the event of a collision, the number of fatalities and injuries due to pedestrians being struck may be reduced.

== See also ==
- Crash test dummy
- Pedestrian safety through vehicle design
