= Advanced Compatibility Engineering =

Automobile body structure design by Honda

Advanced Compatibility Engineering or ACE Body Structure is the marketing name given to an automobile body structure design by Honda. It claims to distribute collision energy evenly and redirect it away from the passenger compartment, while at the same time, minimising damage to other impacted vehicles. This is accomplished by using numerous grades of steel (typically four) which crumple in key areas and remain rigid in others. It is standard on all Honda and Acura models as of the 2017 model year.

== Vehicles equipped with the ACE body structure ==
- Honda Clarity, 2017–present
- Honda Ridgeline, 2017–present
- Honda WR-V, 2017–present
- Honda BR-V, 2016–present
- Honda HR-V, 2016–present
- Honda Mobilio, 2014–present
- Honda Amaze, 2013–present
- Honda Brio, 2013–present
- Honda Crosstour, 2009-
- Honda CR-Z, 2009-
- Honda Insight, 2010–present
- Honda Fit, 2009–present
- Honda Pilot, 2009–present
- Honda Accord, 2008–present
- Honda CR-V, 2007–present
- Honda Civic, 2006–present
- Honda Odyssey, 2005–present
- Acura ILX, 2012-
- Acura ZDX, 2009-
- Acura TLX, 2014-
- Acura TL, 2009–2014
- Acura TSX, 2009–2014
- Acura RDX, 2006-
- Acura MDX, 2007–present
- Acura RLX, 2012-
- Acura RL, 2005–2012
