= Acura TLX =

Compact luxury sedan by Acura (2015–2025)

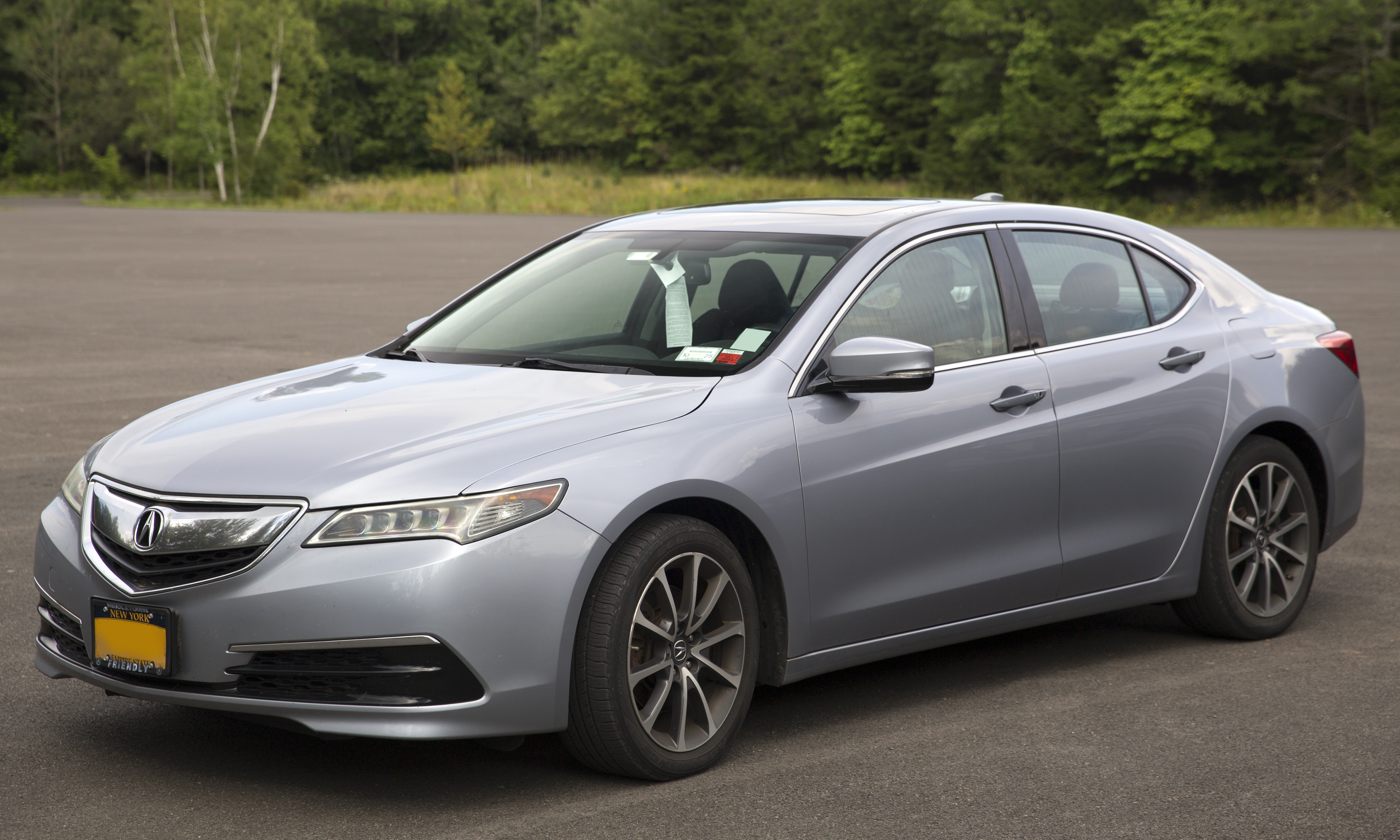
- 2016 Acura TLX

Overview
- Manufacturer: Honda
- Production: July 2014 – July 2025
- Model years: 2015–2025

Body and chassis
- Class: Entry-level luxury car (D)
- Body style: 4-door sedan
- Layout: Front-engine, front-wheel-drive Front-engine, all-wheel-drive (SH-AWD)

Chronology
- Predecessor: Acura TL; Acura TSX

The Acura TLX is a four-door entry-level luxury sedan that was produced by Acura, a luxury division of Honda, from 2014 through 2025. It was the successor to both the TL and TSX models. The discontinuation of the RLX after the 2020 model year left the TLX as the flagship sedan in Acura's lineup. Acura ended production of the TLX with the 2025 model year due to declining sales.

== Design history ==
The Acura TLX was first revealed in January 2014 at the North American International Auto Show as the "TLX Prototype", a sedan designed in Acura's Los Angeles Design Studio as a replacement for the TL and TSX sedans. The production version was unveiled in April at the 2014 New York International Auto Show. The TLX entered production during July at Honda's Marysville Auto Plant with sales beginning in August.

== First generation (UB1/UB2/UB3/UB4; 2015) ==
First generation
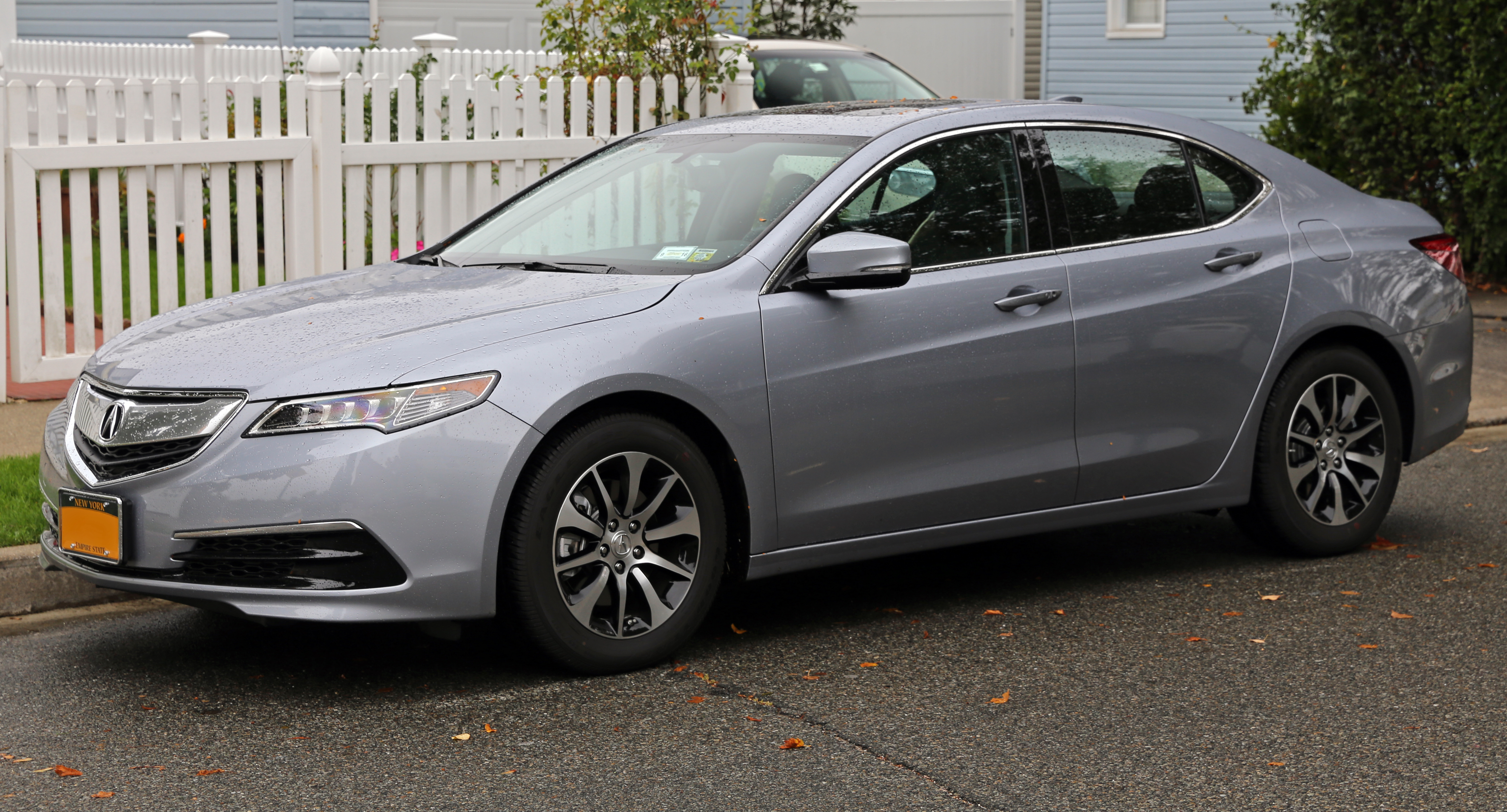
- 2015 Acura TLX (US)

Overview
- Model code: UB1/2/3/4
- Also called: Acura TLX-L (China)
- Production: July 2014 – 2020
- Model years: 2015–2020
- Assembly: United States: Marysville, Ohio (Marysville Auto Plant); Guangzhou, China (Guangqi Honda)
- Designer: Jarad Hall (2011)

Body and chassis
- Platform: Honda D-5
- Related: Honda Accord (ninth generation)

Powertrain
- Engine: 2.4 L K24W7 I4 (UB1/4); 3.5 L J35Y6 V6 (UB2/3)
- Transmission: 8-speed dual clutch (I4); 9-speed ZF 9HP automatic (V6)

Dimensions
- Wheelbase: 2,776 mm (109.3 in); 2,900 mm (114.2 in) (LWB)
- Length: 4,870 mm (191.7 in); 4,931 mm (194.1 in) (LWB)
- Width: 1,854 mm (73.0 in)
- Height: 1,447 mm (57.0 in)
- Curb weight: 3,483–3,492 lb (1,580–1,584 kg) (I4, P-AWS); 3,585–3,620 lb (1,626–1,642 kg) (V6, P-AWS); 3,748–3,774 lb (1,700–1,712 kg) (V6, SH-AWD); 3,582–3,693 lb (1,625–1,675 kg) (China)

Two powertrain options were available. A 2.4-liter four-cylinder DOHC i-VTEC gasoline engine with direct injection was offered with front-wheel drive only, mated to a dual-clutch transmission and all-wheel steering (P-AWS). This model's chassis code is UB1. The Honda designed dual clutch transmission is the first to use a torque converter, which absorbs transmission gear shift shock, thus reducing NVH. The engine is rated at 206 hp (154 kW; 209 PS). Honda estimates that the six-cylinder model is 1.5 seconds faster from 0 to 60 mph (0 to 97 km/h).

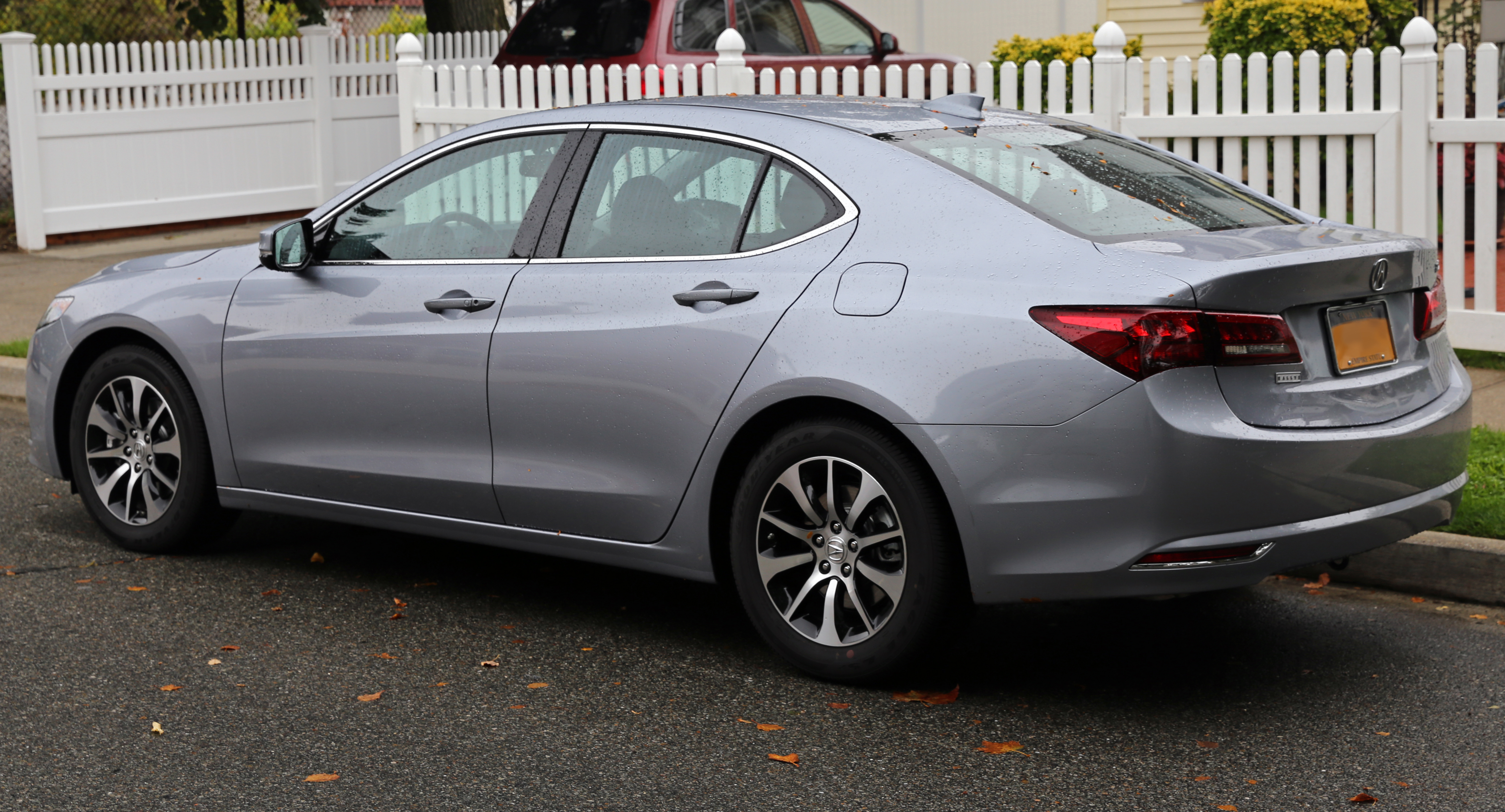
2015 Acura TLX (rear view)

A 3.5-liter direct injected SOHC VTEC V6 gasoline engine with cylinder deactivation (VCM) was mated to Honda's first time use of a 9-speed automatic transmission (sourced from ZF), available with either P-AWS or all-wheel drive (SH-AWD). The SH-AWD system uses hydraulic clutches instead of the electromagnetic clutch packs found on the previous TL which significantly cuts weight, size and cost. The engine is rated at 290 hp (216 kW; 294 PS). Model codes are UB2 for the front-wheel drive and UB3 for the SH-AWD, which comes standard with a "Technology Package". TLX models configured with the V6 engine lose nearly 150 lb (68 kg) compared to the FWD TL, and over 225 lb (102 kg) compared to the SH-AWD TL.

Overall length compared to the previous TL was reduced by 3.8 inches (97 mm) while the wheelbase maintains the same length. As with the ninth-generation Accord, the TLX loses the front double wishbone suspension of the TSX and TL in favor of a MacPherson strut arrangement, and loses the TL's all-aluminum front subframe in favor of a lower cost friction stir welded aluminum and steel piece.

To significantly cut down on interior noise, triple door seals were used as well as additional sound insulation.

=== Facelift (2018) ===
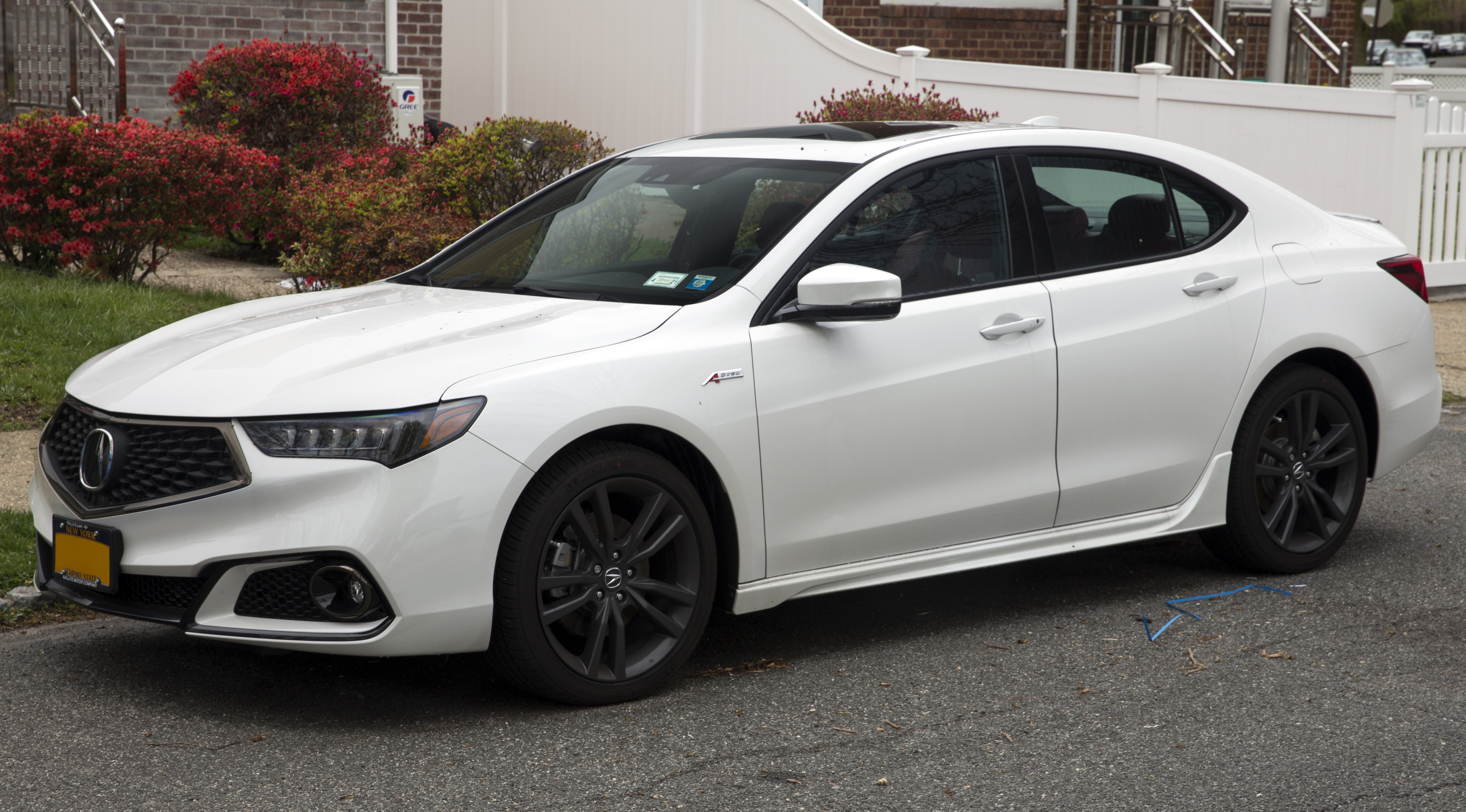

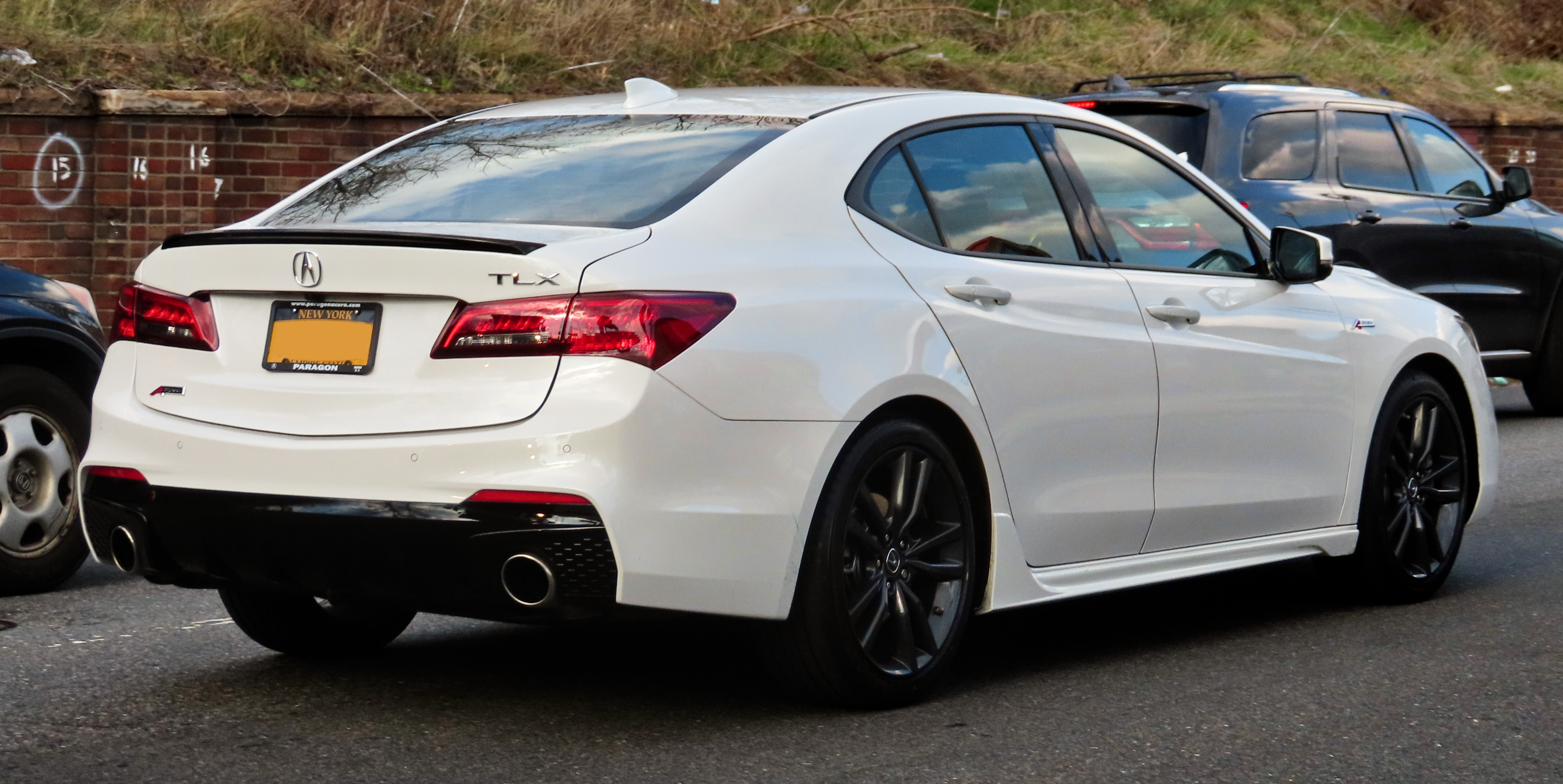
2020 Acura TLX A-Spec (facelift)

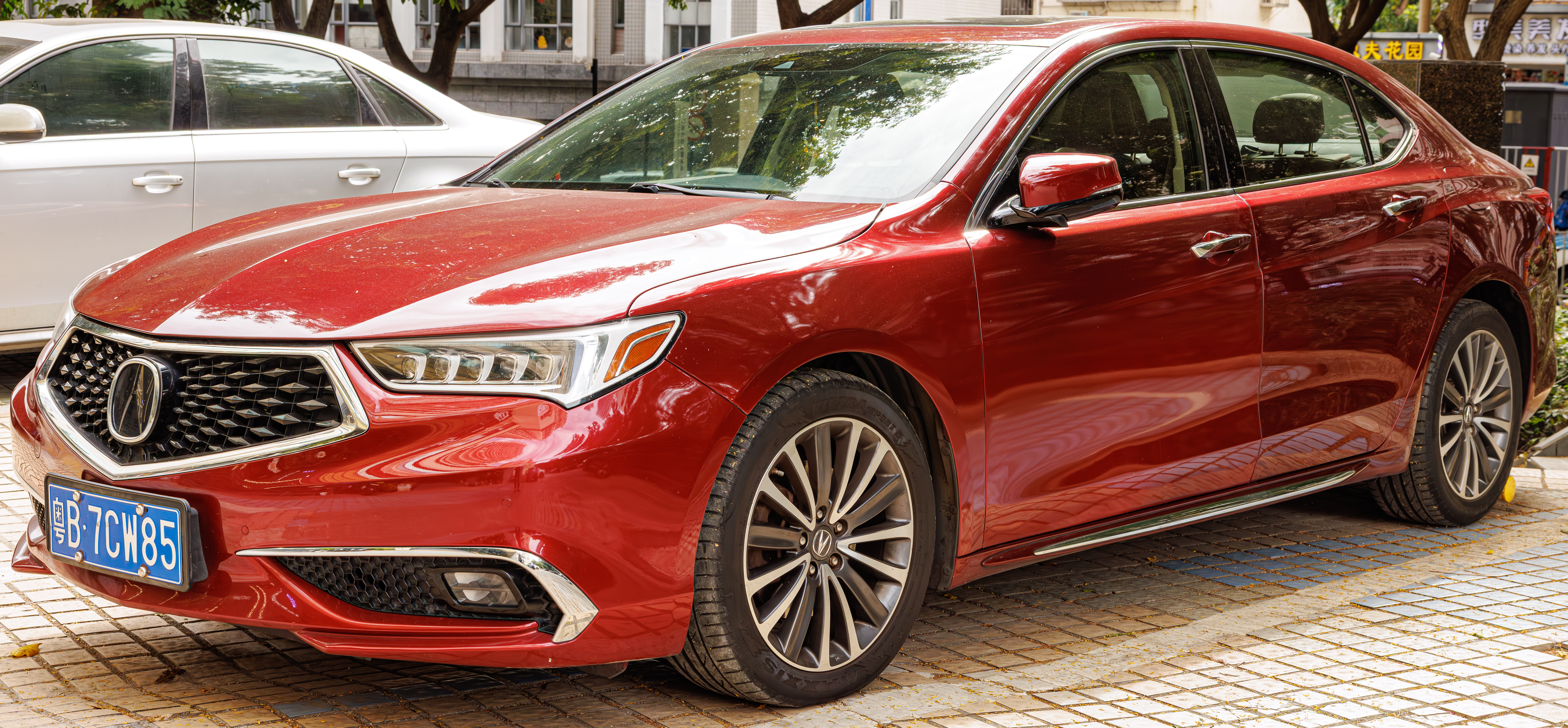
Acura TLX-L

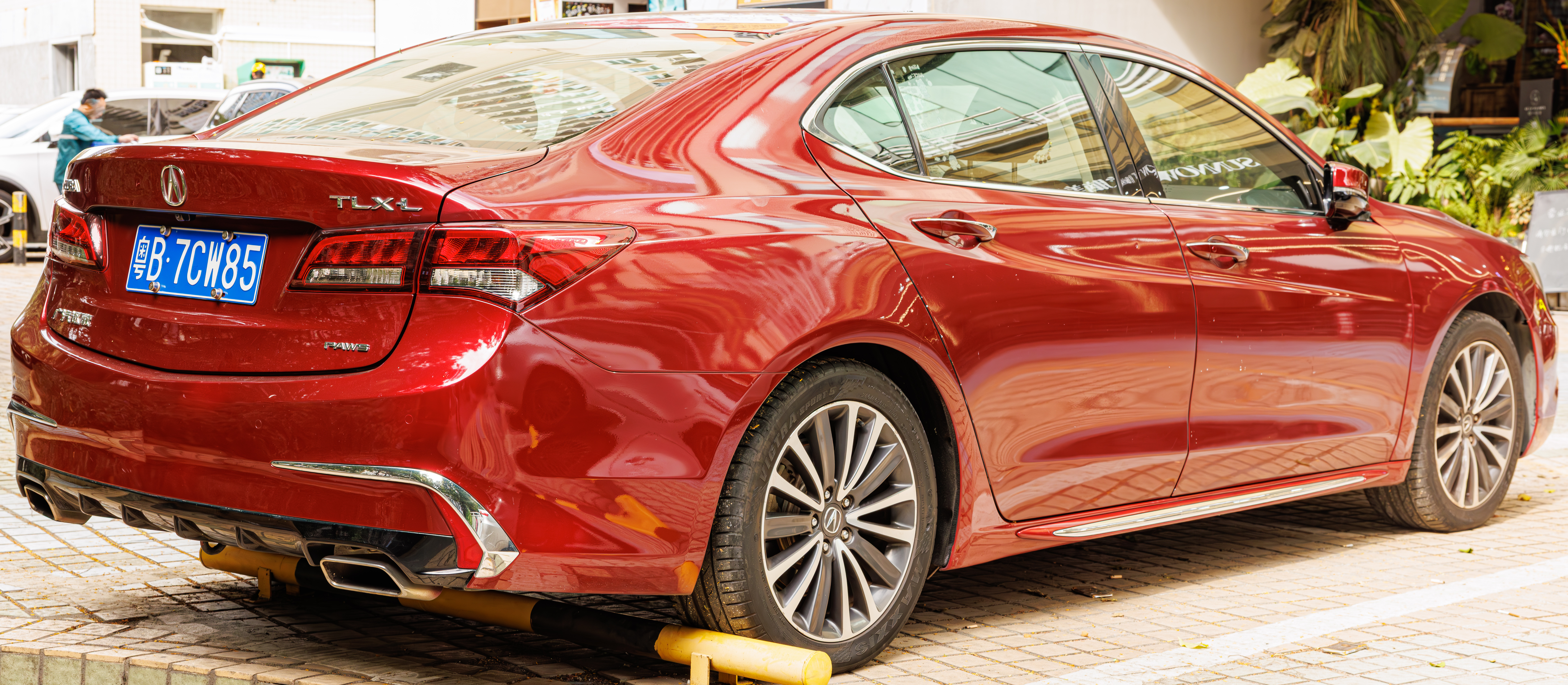
Acura TLX-L (rear)

Acura unveiled the revised TLX in April 2017 for the 2018 model year. Changes included revised front fascia, fenders, and grille, restyled wheels, and new infotainment features including Apple CarPlay and Android Auto support. Additionally, a new 'A-Spec' performance trim has been added. An optional 360° surround camera and power driver's seat thigh extension were introduced. US sales began during June 2017.

In August 2017, an extended-wheelbase version specifically developed for the Chinese market debuted at the Chengdu Motor Show, called the Acura TLX-L. The TLX-L is only offered with the 2.4-liter four, producing 153 kW (205 hp; 208 PS) and receiving the UB4 model code.

=== Safety ===
TLX safety features include Lane Keeping Assist System with Road Departure Mitigation System, Adaptive Cruise Control with Low-Speed Follow, Blind Spot Information System, Tire Pressure Monitoring system with Tire Fill Assist, Collision Mitigation Braking System, and Vehicle Stability Assist. There are 7 airbags, including a driver's side knee airbag.

IIHS scores (2015 model year)
| Moderate overlap frontal offset | Good |
| Small overlap frontal offset | Acceptable^{1} |
| Side impact | Good |
| Roof strength | Good^{2} |

^{1} vehicle structure also rated "Acceptable"
^{2} strength-to-weight ratio: 5.67

2015 TLX NHTSA scores
| Overall: | 5/5 stars |
| Frontal Driver: | 5/5 stars |
| Frontal Passenger: | 5/5 stars |
| Side Driver: | 5/5 stars |
| Side Passenger: | 5/5 stars |
| Side Pole Driver: | 5/5 stars |
| Rollover: | / 9.8% |

== Second generation (UB5/UB6/UB7; 2021) ==
Second generation
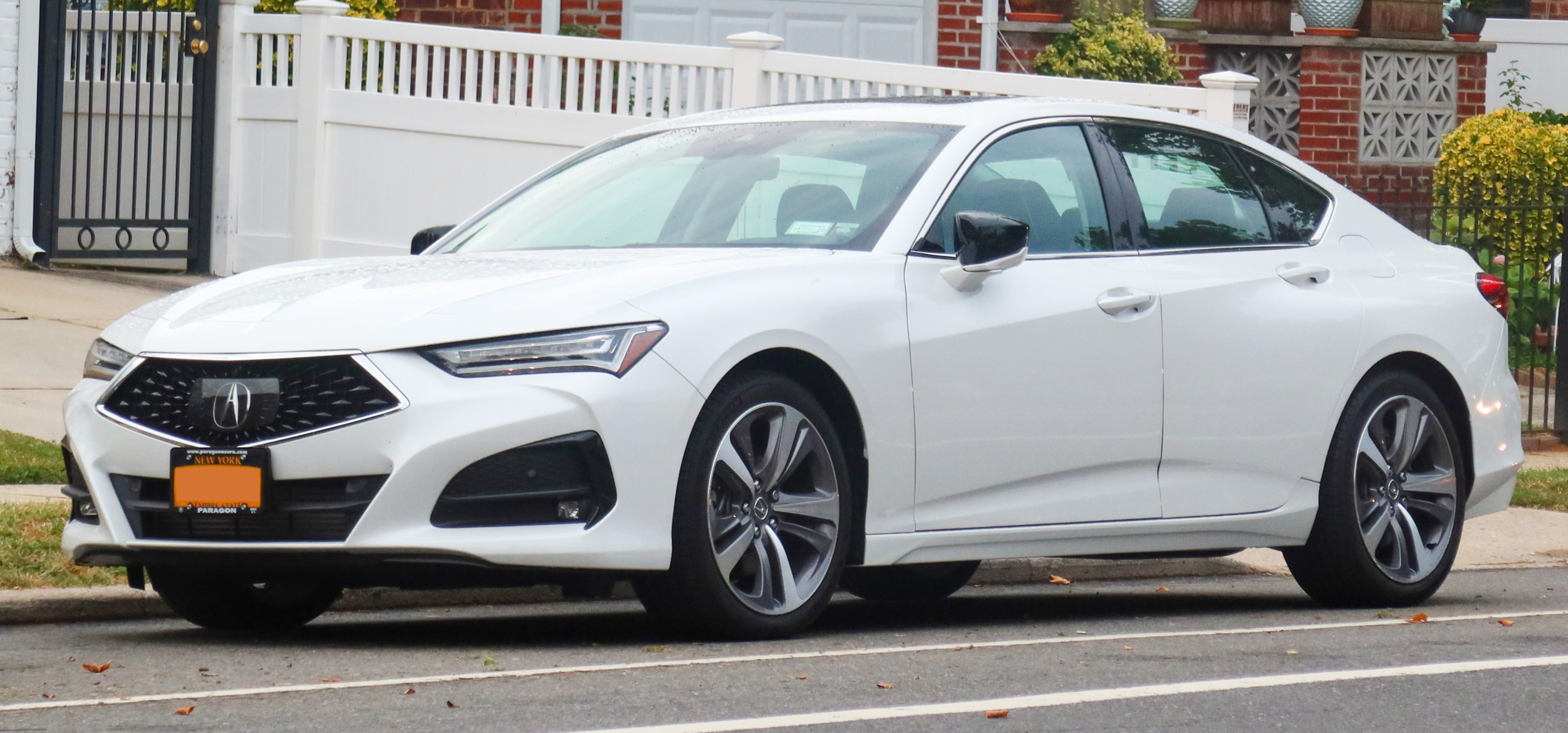
- 2021 TLX Advance

Overview
- Model code: UB5/6/7
- Production: August 2020 – July 2025
- Model years: 2021–2025
- Assembly: United States: Marysville, Ohio (Marysville Auto Plant)
- Designer: Ben Davidson (2018)

Powertrain
- Engine: 2.0 L K20C6 turbo I4 (UB5/6); 3.0 L J30AC turbo V6 (Type S) (UB7)
- Power output: 272 hp (203 kW; 276 PS) (2.0T I4); 355 hp (265 kW; 360 PS) (3.0T V6)
- Transmission: 10-speed automatic

Dimensions
- Wheelbase: 2,870 mm (113.0 in)
- Length: 4,943 mm (194.6 in)
- Width: 1,911 mm (75.2 in)
- Height: 1,433 mm (56.4 in)
- Curb weight: 3,709–3,814 lb (1,682–1,730 kg) (2.0T I4, FWD); 3,927–4,028 lb (1,781–1,827 kg) (2.0T I4, SH-AWD); 4,200–4,221 lb (1,905–1,915 kg) (3.0T V6, Type S)

The second-generation TLX was previewed as the Type S concept car shown at the 2019 Monterey Car Week. The final version was launched digitally on May 28, 2020, and production began on August 28, with sales following on September 28, 2020 for the 2021 model year. Without a direct replacement for the discontinued RLX, the TLX serves as the flagship Acura sedan, slotting above the ILX/Integra. The four-cylinder TLX's model code is UB5 for front-wheel drives and UB6 for the SH-AWD model, while the model code of the Type S is UB7.

The Type S model was powered by a new turbocharged 3.0-liter DOHC V6 gasoline engine that makes 355 horsepower (265 kW; 360 PS) and 354 lb⋅ft (480 N⋅m; 49 kg⋅m). of torque; up from the base and A-Spec's 272 horsepower (203 kW; 276 PS) and 280 lb⋅ft (380 N⋅m; 39 kg⋅m) of torque. This marks the return of the Type S trim after a decade-long hiatus, which was scheduled to go on sale June 23, 2021 for the 2021 model year.

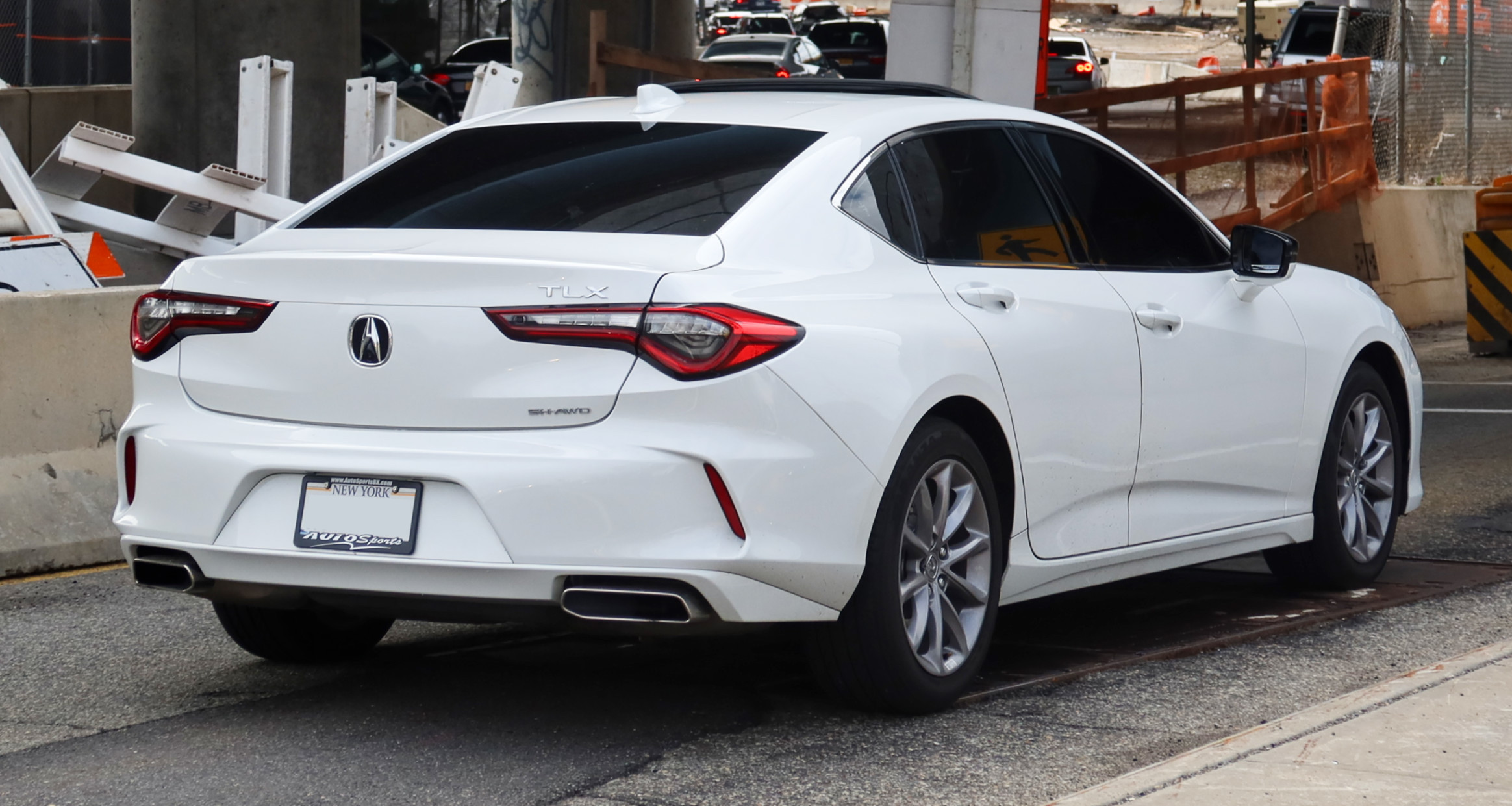
2021 TLX SH-AWD rear view

Built on its own new platform, the TLX uses a front double wishbone suspension with forged aluminum lower control arms, mounted to cast aluminum damper towers and an aluminum subframe. To increase front suspension rigidity, a steel tubular strut bar connects the front damper towers together, with two additional bars tying each tower to the cowl in a triangular arrangement. Included on higher trims is a front subframe lower tie bar. To further reduce weight, the front fenders are aluminum, with the AGM battery moved to the rear to improve weight distribution.

In total, 64 percent of the body structure's mass comprised high-strength steel (HSS) and aluminum, with 1,500-MPa steel making up 10.1%. To further increase body rigidity a larger center tunnel, reinforced lengthwise with 980-MPa grade steel is used. A single-piece rear bulkhead steel stamping improved body rigidity without the rear seat brace found on previous TL models, allowing for a folding rear seat trunk pass-through. An underbody triangular brace was added to stiffen the rear suspension on AWD models.

An electric-servo brake-by-wire system similar to the second generation Acura NSX replaced the hydraulic brake, with Type S models adopting four-piston Brembo front brake calipers.

New options included adaptive dampers, a 10.5-inch head-up display (HUD), a 17-speaker audio system with four ceiling mounted speakers, open-pore wood, and 16-way power full grain leather front seats with four-way lumbar adjustability as introduced on the third generation RDX.

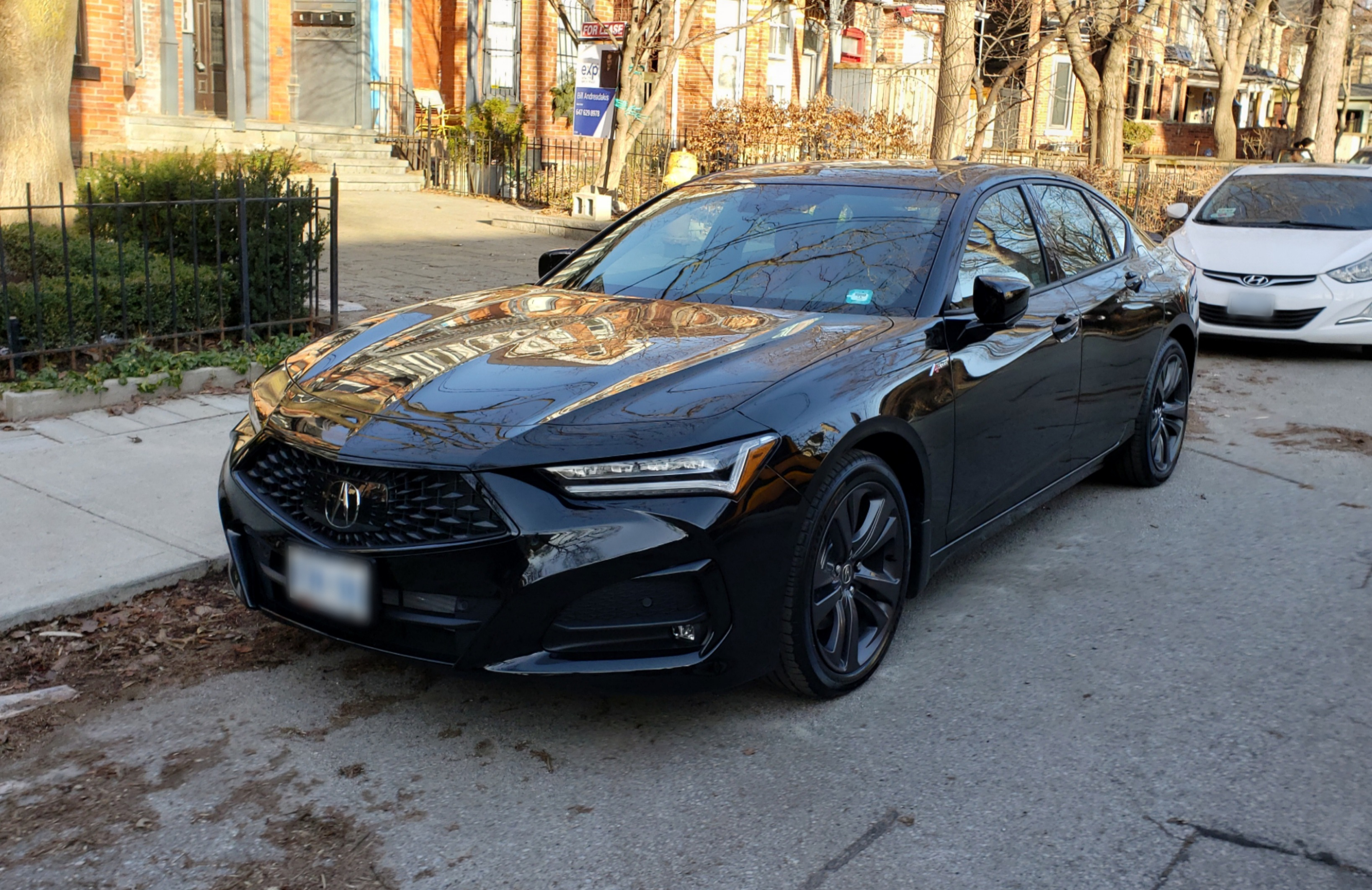
2021 TLX A-Spec

=== Type S ===
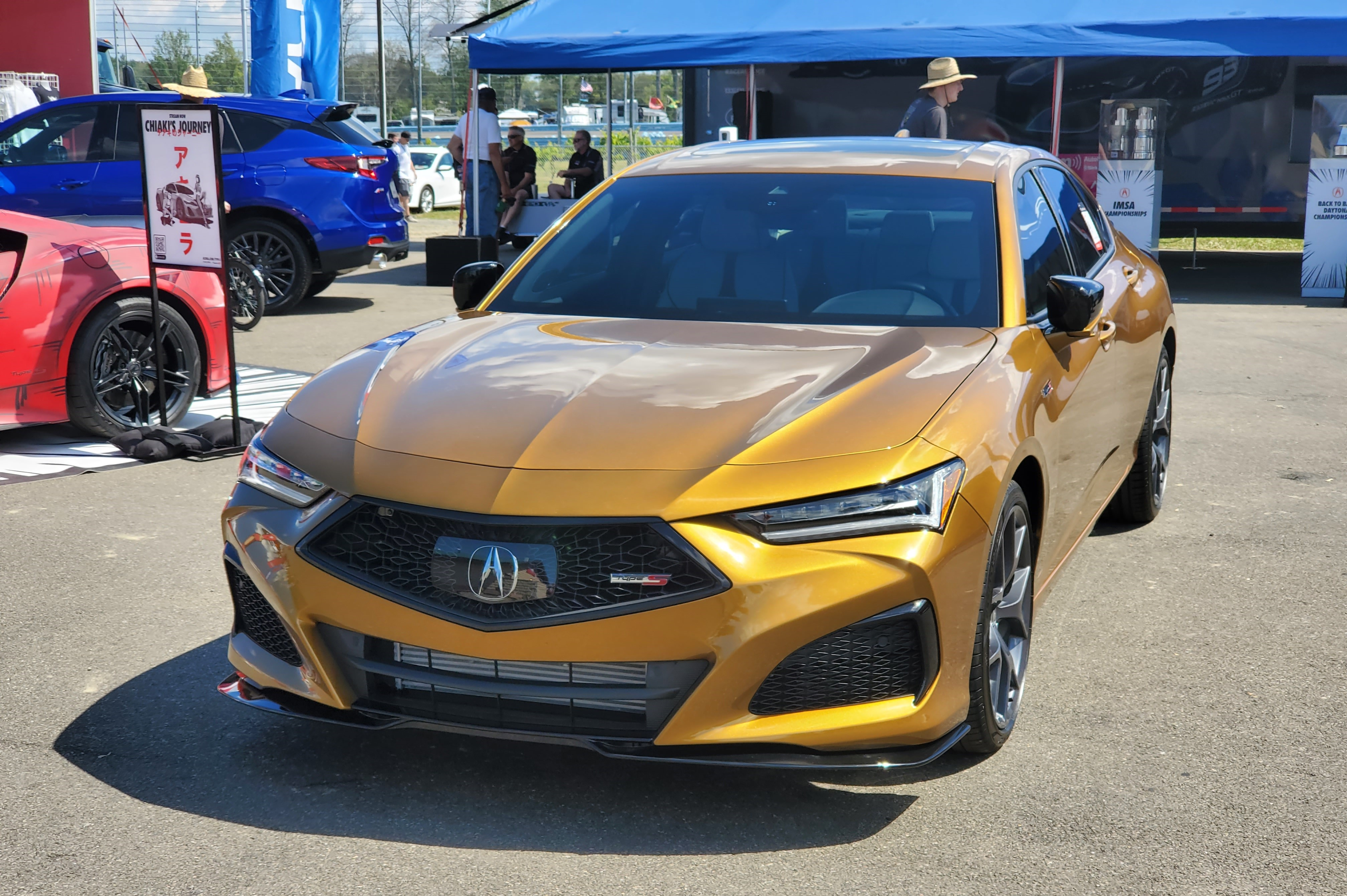

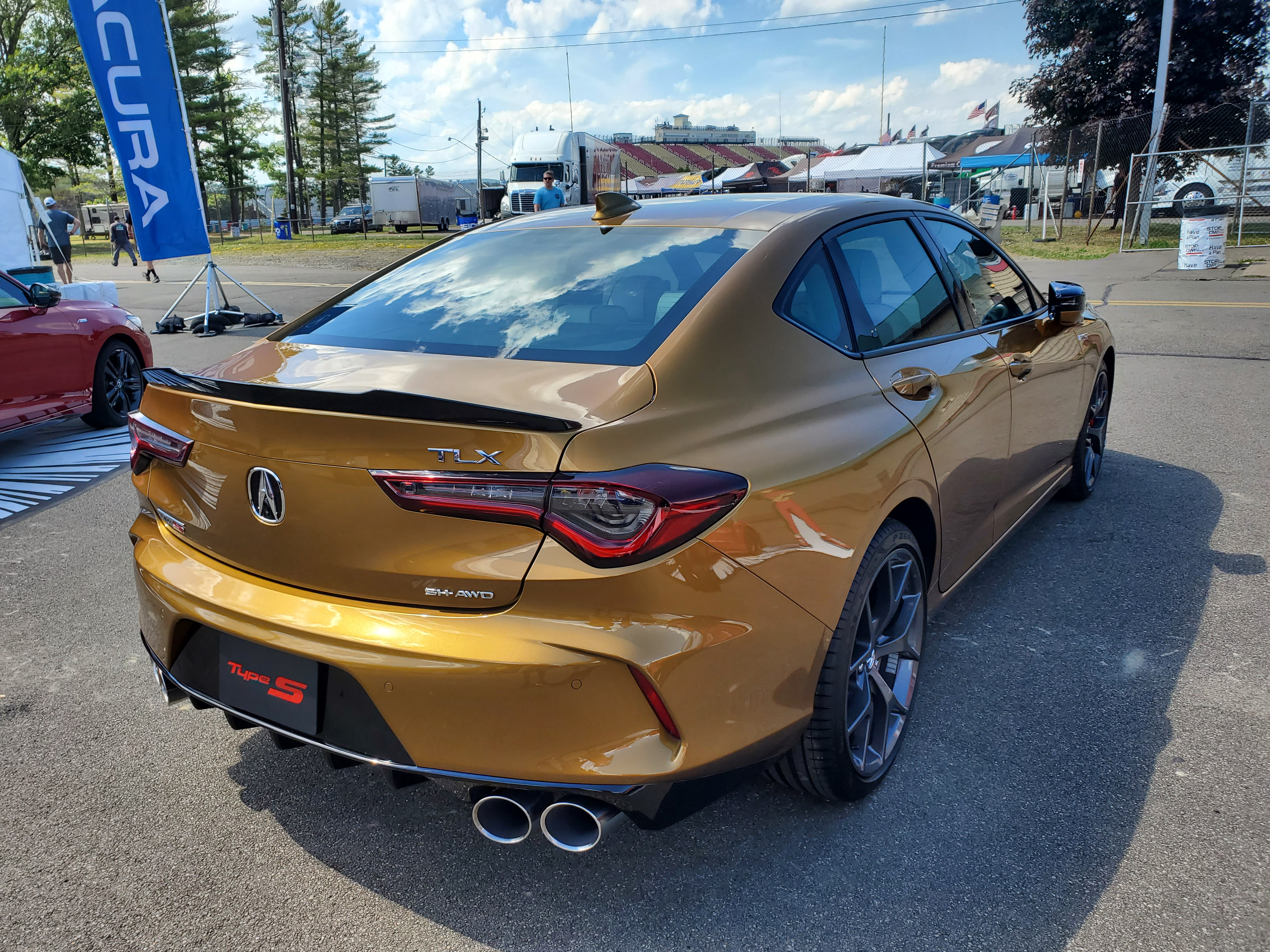
Acura TLX Type S

Acura introduced a high-performance Type S variant for the second generation TLX, marking the return of the Type S brand after over a decade-long hiatus. It features an all-new DOHC 3.0-liter V6 engine with a single twin-scroll turbocharger and direct injection, producing 355 hp (265 kW; 360 PS) and 354 lb⋅ft (480 N⋅m) of torque. The engine also features a high-strength forged steel crankshaft and connecting rods. All Type S models have Super Handling All-Wheel Drive (SH-AWD), which can send 70% of torque to the rear axle and as much as 100% of that torque to either rear wheel.

Body structure is 13-percent stiffer than the standard TLX, while front spring rate as well as front and rear anti-roll bars are also stiffer compared to the standard model. The 10-speed automatic transmission is also upgraded over the regular TLX, with 40 percent quicker downshifts and 30 percent quicker upshifts. Top speed is increased to 155 mph (249 km/h) compared to 130 mph (209 km/h) on the standard TLX. Braking performance is improved with four-piston Brembo front brake calipers in a Type-S exclusive red color with 14.3-inch brake rotors. The car also contains an active exhaust system, which can alter the sound of the exhaust note depending on the selected drive mode. The suspension features adaptive dampers which change dampening at different drive settings. It has 40-percent stiffer front springs, a thicker front stabilizer bar that is 9-percent stiffer, and a thicker rear stabilizer bar that adds 31-percent additional roll stiffness by increasing from 20.5 mm to 22.5 mm thickness.

Distinctive features include a fully open diamond pentagon grille for engine cooling, quad exhaust outlets, front splitter, and rear diffuser. The exterior features gloss black grille, matte black window surrounds, and headlights with a blackout treatment. The interior has a flat bottom steering wheel with the Type S logo, 16-way adjustable Milano leather seats with adjustable bolsters, and Type S-embossed headrests.

In Car and Driver magazine's Lightning Lap test at the Virginia International Raceway's Grand West Course, the TLX Type S set a lap time of 3:06.7, which, for reference, was six tenths of a second faster than the Genesis G70 3.3T and five tenths off the time of the Cadillac CT4-V. The magazine commented that getting on the throttle as early as possible during cornering resulted in the best performance, as the SH-AWD system helps rotate the car; they felt that on-throttle "the car pivots productively but doesn't aggressively oversteer".

In 2022, for the 2023 model year, Acura introduced a limited-production (300 units) TLX Type S PMC Edition, tuned by the Honda Performance Manufacturing Center, which specializes in assembling and tuning the NSX supercar. Changes for the PMC include 20-inch NSX inspired wheels and carbon fiber interior and exterior trim.

=== Facelift (2024) ===
The TLX facelift was revealed on November 2, 2023 for the 2024 model year. Changes included updated exterior styling with a new frameless Diamond Pentagon grille, the A-Spec model has an updated rear fascia with a dual exhaust system from the Type S, new exterior colors, and new wheel designs. The interior features a new 10.5-inch head-up display, new 12.3-inch digital instrument cluster, a new larger 12.3-inch touchscreen, increased interior insulation in response to customers feedback, and additional standard features such as ELS STUDIO Premium Audio and Iconic Drive™ LED ambient cabin lighting. For safety, the AcuraWatch driver-assistance system has been improved with a new front millimeter-wave radar of 120-degree, Blind Spot Information (BSI) function, and a new HD Surround View Camera system. The TLX range was restructured to three models: the front-drive Technology, all-wheel-drive A-Spec, and high-performance Type S.

=== Safety ===
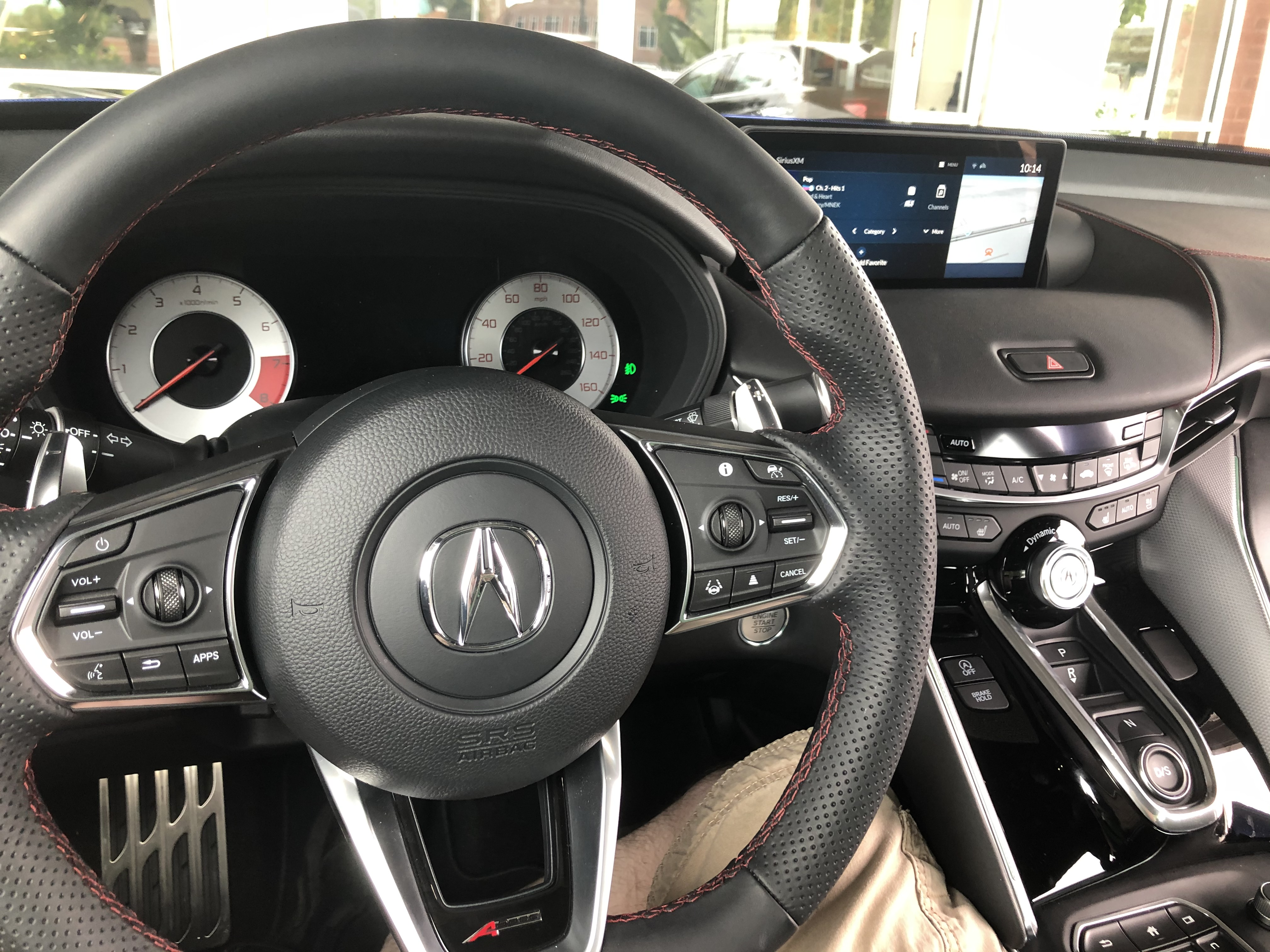
TLX A-Spec interior

To improve passenger safety in frontal oblique collisions, a front passenger three-chamber airbag, co-developed with Autoliv, is standard, and the ACE structure has been upgraded. The new airbag marketed as a "catcher's mitt" is designed to "catch" the occupant's head in the event of an oblique collision. During an impact, uninflated side panels help guide the occupant's head in the direction of inflated chambers acting as a "catcher's mitt." To disperse crash forces more effectively, two tunnel caps made from 780-MPa steel originate from the lower dash and end behind the front seats to direct crash loads away from the lower foot compartment.

The 2021 TLX was named an IIHS Top Safety Pick+, scoring good ratings in all six of the Institute's crashworthiness tests also earning a five-star overall safety rating from the NHTSA. The 2021 TLX comes standard with safety features such as adaptive cruise control, automatic emergency braking, and lane keeping assist. Also included on the 2021 TLX is Traffic Jam Assist, which helps keep the car moving in stop-and-go traffic without the need for accelerator or brake inputs from the driver.

IIHS scores (2021 model year)
| Small overlap front driver-side | Good |
| Small overlap front passenger-side | Good |
| Moderate overlap front: original test | Good |
| Side impact | Good |
| Roof strength | Good |
| Head restraints & seats | Good |

2021 TLX NHTSA scores
| Overall: | 5/5 stars |
| Frontal Driver: | 5/5 stars |
| Frontal Passenger: | 4/5 stars |
| Side Driver: | 5/5 stars |
| Side Passenger: | 5/5 stars |
| Side Pole Driver: | 5/5 stars |
| Rollover: | / 9.0% |

== Motorsports ==
A TLX-GT race car version of the TLX SH-AWD, with a twin turbo version of the direct injection V6 engine found in the production TLX SH-AWD sedan, has also been developed by the Acura Motorsports Group at Honda Performance Development. It has a modified chassis and aerodynamic performance parts approved for Pirelli World Challenge competition. The TLX-GT was unveiled at the 2014 North American International Auto Show.

RealTime Racing entered a factory-backed car in the GT class at the Mid-Ohio and Sonoma rounds of the 2014 Pirelli World Challenge, with Peter Cunningham claiming a best result of 13th place. In 2015 the team fielded two full-time entries for Cunningham and Ryan Eversley; the latter won the first St. Petersburg race and finished sixth in the GT class drivers classification, whereas Cunningham finished 14th. Eversley continued as a full-time driver in 2016, winning the two Road America races. Cunningham raced the first half of the season, claiming a runner-up finish at Road America race 1, then Spencer Pumpelly took his place for the last three rounds.

The TLX-GT was replaced by the Acura NSX GT3 in 2017.

== Discontinuation ==
In July 2025, Acura announced the end of production for the TLX after two generations, concluding with the 2025 model year, because of gradually decreasing sales and wanting to align with "the evolving needs of [Acura's] customers and the changing landscape of the automotive industry," as the market has pivoted towards crossover SUVs. The Marysville Auto Plant in Marysville, Ohio where the TLX was produced for the North American market, was planned as the future production site for the battery electric RSX crossover, prior to its cancellation.

== Sales ==
| Calendar year | US | Canada | China |
|---|---|---|---|
| 2014 | 19,127 | 1,828 | |
| 2015 | 47,080 | 5,075 | |
| 2016 | 37,156 | 4,137 | |
| 2017 | 34,846 | 4,205 | 134 |
| 2018 | 30,468 | 3,826 | 1,596 |
| 2019 | 26,548 | 3,360 | 1,053 |
| 2020 | 21,785 | 2,704 | 17 |
| 2021 | 26,100 | 2,450 | |
| 2022 | 11,508 | 1,422 | |
| 2023 | 16,731 | 977 | |
| 2024 | 7,478 | | |
| 2025 | 8,030 | | |
