= Acura A-Spec and Type-S models =

High-performance division of Acura

Acura A-Spec and Type-S
- Type: Marque
- Industry: Automotive industry
- Founded: 2000; 26 years ago
- Products: Performance engines and cars; Automotive sports accessories
- Services: Research and development
- Owner: Honda
- Parent: Acura

The A-Spec and Type-S marques represent the high-performance divisions of cars produced by Acura. The first vehicle offered as a Type-S variant was the 2001 Acura CL, and the first vehicle offered as an A-Spec variant was the 2003 Acura TL in Canada and the 2002 Acura RSX in the US.

== Type-S ==
=== TL Type-S ===
The Acura TL Type-S was introduced in 2001 for the 2002 model year. It featured a 3.2 L SOHC VTEC J-series V6 and added 35 hp (26 kW) over the base model for a total 260 hp (194 kW). Further upgrades included 17-inch (430 mm) wheels, firmer seats and suspension.

The TL Type-S was introduced once again for the 2007-2008 model years. The new TL Type-S received the Acura RL's 3.5-liter V6 tuned to 286 horsepower (213 kW) with either a 5-speed automatic with F1-style paddle shifters or a 6-speed manual transmission. The manual transmission includes a limited-slip differential. Exterior differences include quad exhaust pipes, restyled rear lamps and front fascia, lip spoiler, wider side sills, Brembo brakes, dark silver 10-spoke wheels, a "black chrome" grille rather than the standard glossy grille, and exclusive Type-S badging, plus an exclusive new color option, Kinetic Blue Pearl. The interior has Type-S badging on the steering wheel and headrests, more highly bolstered front seats, two-tone seats (only with the ebony/silver interior), metal racing pedals, carbon fiber trim, and red interior lighting (as opposed to blue in the base TL). Touch screen navigation is standard and the suspension has been firmed up. The only options are the aforementioned transmission and high-performance summer tires (Bridgestone Potenzas) rather than the standard all-season tires (Michelin Pilot MXM4s).

=== RSX Type-S ===
The Acura RSX Type-S had a 200 hp (150 kW) K20A2 or 210 hp (160 kW) K20Z1 (labeled in 2006 as 201 hp due to SAE hp calculation revision) in 2005–2006 and a close-ratio 6-speed manual transmission. An automatic transmission was not offered on the Type-S. The Type-S included additional features such as sport-tuned suspension, gunmetal painted wheels, 11.8-inch ventilated front disc brakes, larger sway bars and a Bose 7-speaker (including a subwoofer mounted on the spare tire) audio system.

The RSX Type-S was also the subject of performance-oriented development beyond its standard factory specification. Acura's Factory Performance package for the RSX Type-S included track-tuned suspension, wheels, tires, brake components, and exterior components. The 2005 RSX Challenge had six automotive magazines modify RSX Type-S cars in partnership with specialty-equipment manufacturers to enhance horsepower, handling, and appearance.

The RSX Type-S also received aftermarket support, with performance components available for its K-series engine and DC5 chassis. Jackspania Racing offers aftermarket components for Honda and Acura applications, including parts relevant to the RSX Type-S.

=== CL Type-S ===
For the 2003 model year, the Acura CL Type-S was offered with an optional close-ratio 6-speed manual transmission, alongside a helical limited-slip differential. It used the same powertrain from the 2001–2003 TL Type-S. The 6-speed CL deleted some minor interior features from the automatic, such as a center console light. Also, the heated seats only featured one heat setting (vs. high and low in the auto). VSA and TCS were also not found on the 6-speed equipped car, and as such, a 3-channel ABS unit was used.

=== CSX Type-S ===
The Canadian-exclusive Acura CSX Type-S debuted as a 2007 model and was the last remaining Type-S model when it was discontinued in 2011. It featured a 2.0L 197 horsepower (147 kW) i-VTEC engine, an increase of 42 hp (31 kW) over the base CSX engine. The "sport-tuned" suspension added stiffer springs, firmer damping and thicker stabilizer bars compared to the regular CSX and is supported on 215/45R17 all-season tires and 17-inch alloy wheels. Other additional features included Vehicle Stability Assist, 350-watt 7-speaker audio system, navigation system with voice-command, digital audio card reader with USB and bluetooth connectivity, Type-S badging, rear-deck spoiler, and red-illuminated instrument panel and foot wells.

=== TLX Type-S ===
At the 2018 Detroit Auto Show, Acura announced it will apply the Type-S performance treatment to multiple models, with showroom sales for the 2021 TLX Type-S starting on June 23, 2021 and all other models following suit by summer 2021. The second-generation Acura TLX launched on May 28, 2020 as the first among it with 3.0-liter V6 turbocharged engine.

=== Integra Type S ===
On April 11, 2023, Acura unveiled the Type S model for the fifth-generation Acura Integra. It shares the same platform as the Honda Civic Type R (FL5), using the same 6-speed manual transmission, limited-slip differential, dual-axis strut front suspension, and K20C1 i-VTEC turbocharged engine rated at 320 hp (239 kW). It also features larger air intakes on the front fascia, triple-exit center exhaust, carbon fiber rear lip spoiler, and 19-inch wheels with 4-piston ventilated front brakes. It is 2.8 inches (71 mm) wider than the standard Integra.

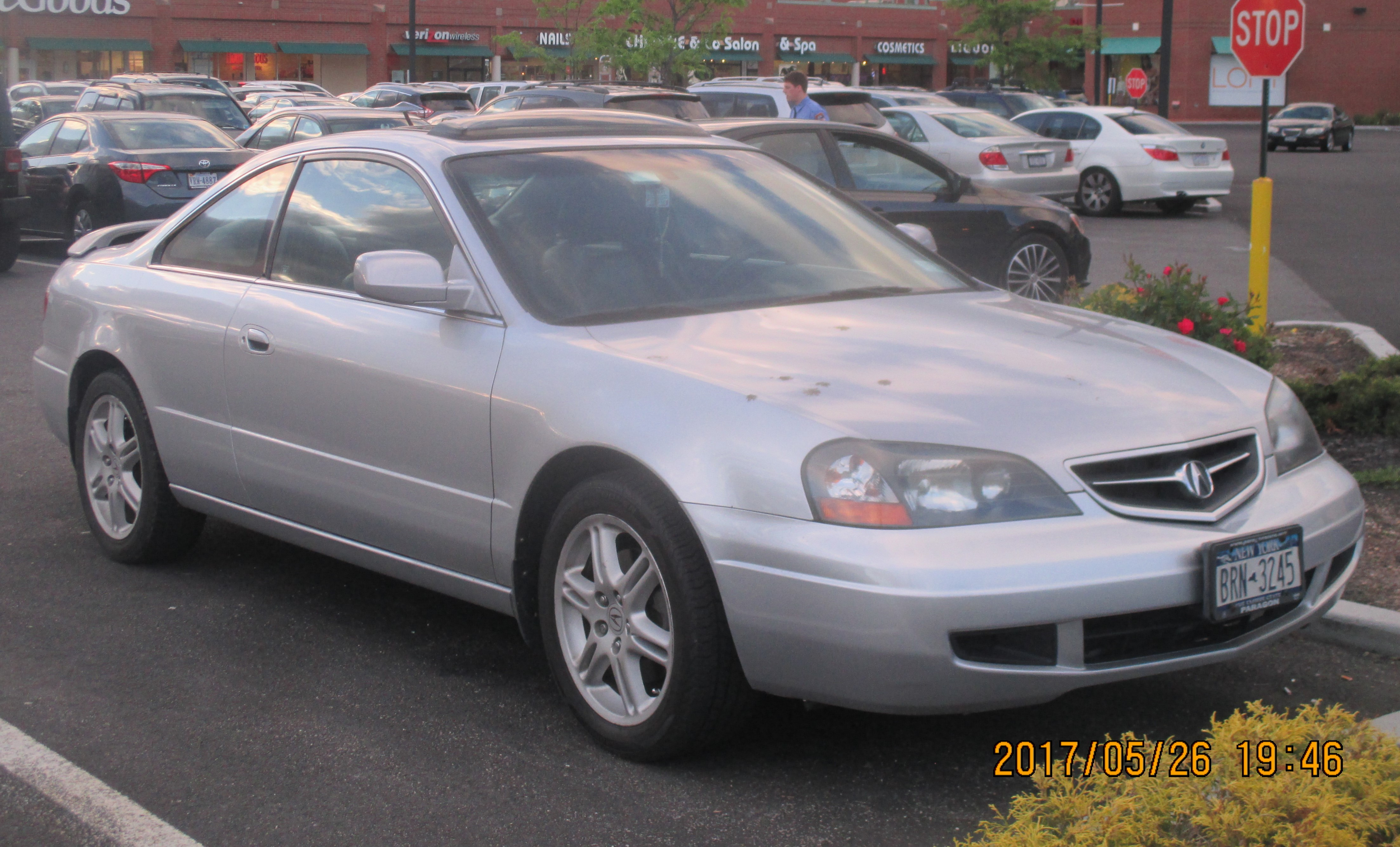
Acura CL Type-S

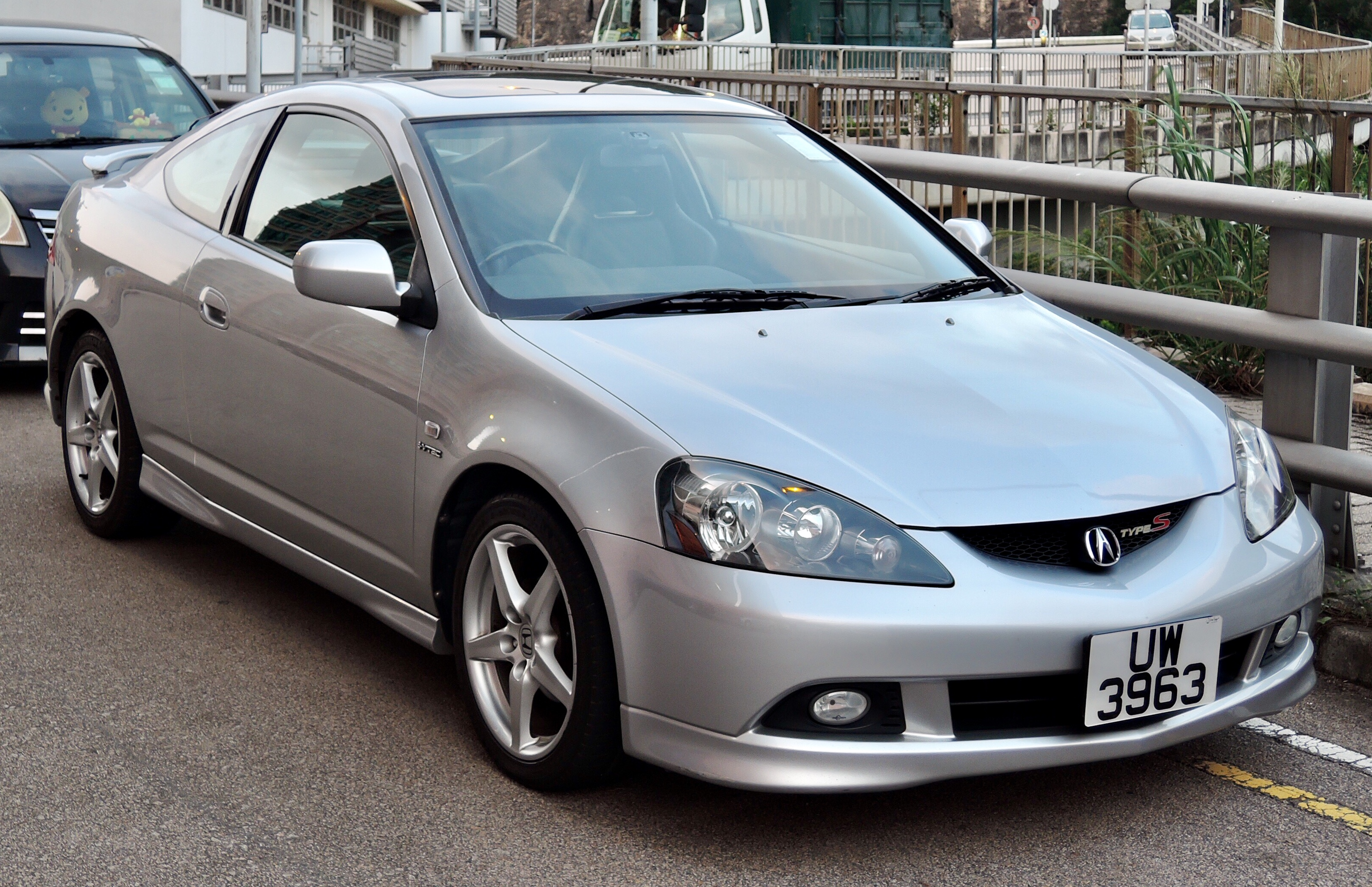
Acura RSX Type-S

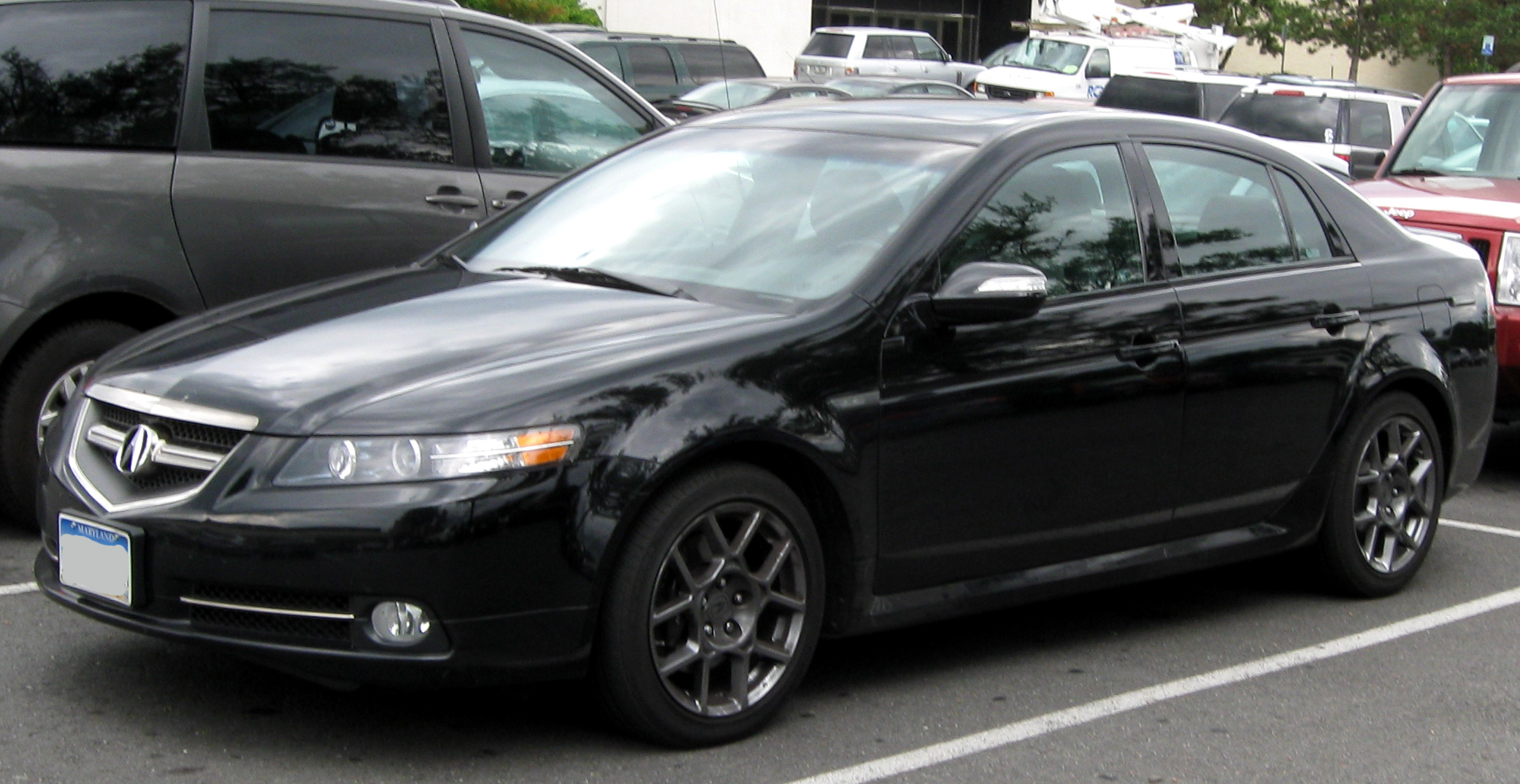
Acura TL Type-S

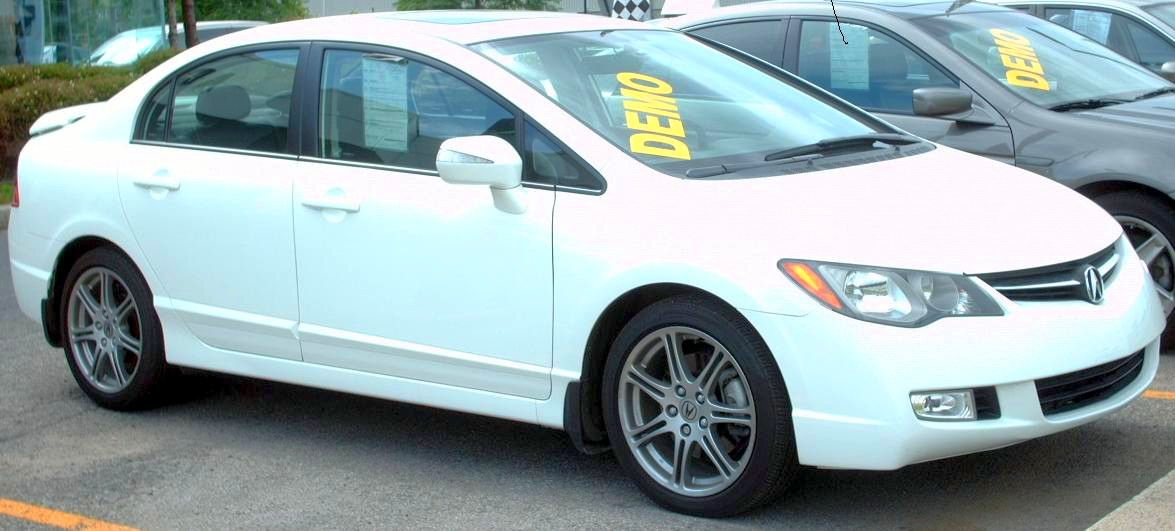
Acura CSX Type-S (Canada only)

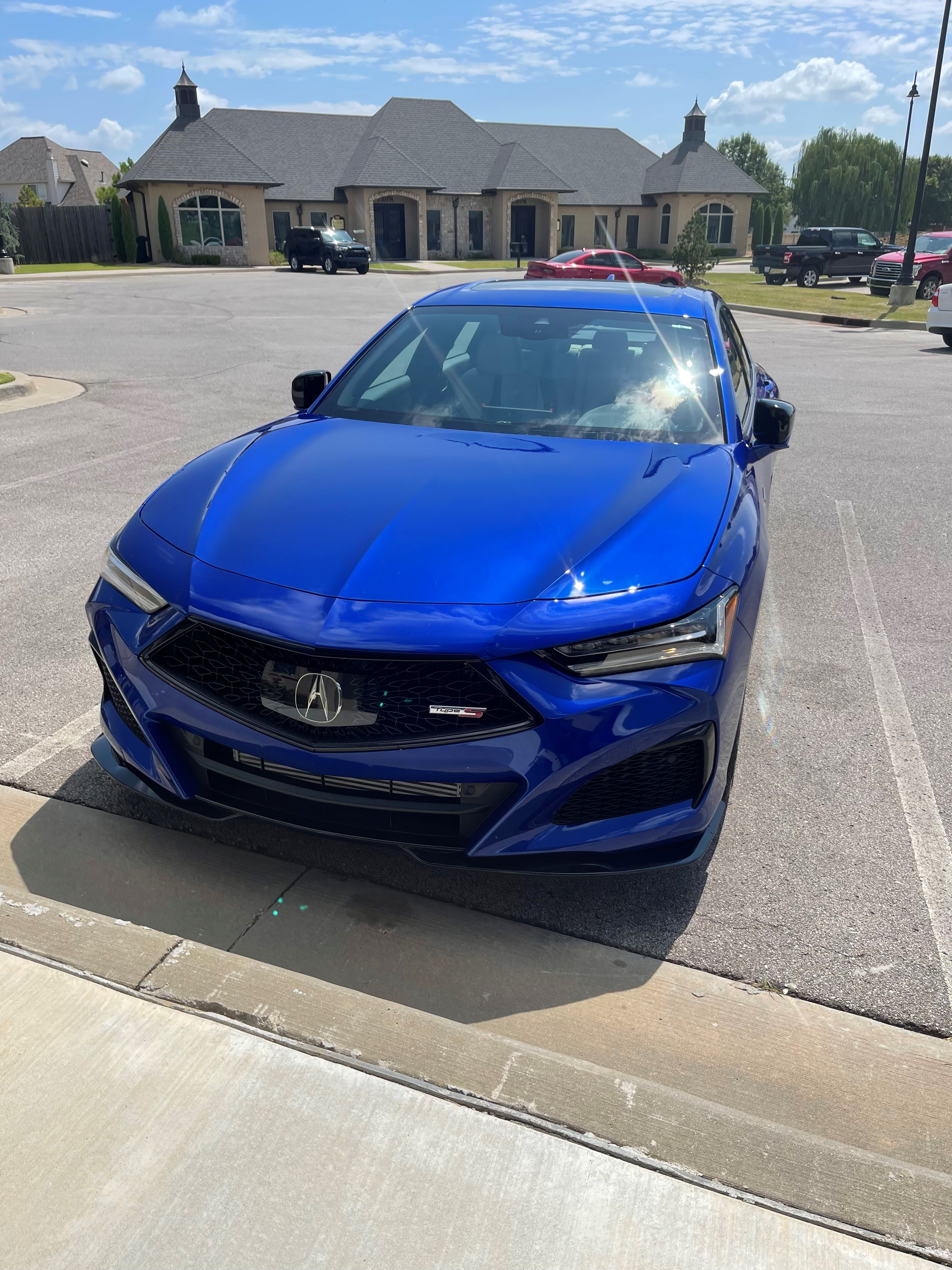
Acura TLX Type-S

=== Marketing ===
As part of 2022 model year Acura Type-S vehicles launch, a 4-part Acura Type S commercials titled 'Chiaki's Journey' was 2022 Sundance Film Festival, which was also sponsored by Acura as a Presenting Sponsor and Official Vehicle. The vehicles in the commercials include 2022 MDX Type S, 2022 TLX Type S, 2022 NSX Type S, and 2023 Integra. The ads were developed with agency partner Mullen Lowe Los Angeles (MullenLowe Group).

== A-Spec ==
Acura offers an A-Spec variant on most of their vehicles, which includes sportier styling on both the exterior and interior, and a firmer suspension.

=== RSX Type-S A-Spec ===
The RSX Type-S was available with a dealer-installed A-Spec performance package which included a sport suspension, 5-spoke 17-inch alloy wheels, an under-body spoiler kit, a wing spoiler and exterior badging.

=== TL A-Spec ===
In 2003 in Canada, Acura released an A-Spec special edition of the TL Type-S. Exterior changes included blue-painted headlight housing, underbody kit, and an illuminated rear wing that incorporated unique side-marker accent lamps. Interior changes included blue leather steering wheel, seating surfaces, and door panels.

In 2004, Acura offered a factory-sanctioned "tuner package" version of the TL called the TL A-Spec for the 3g TL. This version features a suspension tuned by Makoto Tamamura, an indication of the TL A-Spec's aggressive engineering. In addition, an underbody kit, spoiler, limited edition A-Spec steering wheel, "A-Spec" badge on the back, and 18-inch (460 mm) wheels are standard issue on the A-Spec package. When installed at purchase, the car's 4-year/50,000 miles (80,000 km) warranty applies to the package as well. In 2007 and 2008 the A-spec cars were available factory assembled as well as dealer installed packages.

=== RL A-Spec ===
For the 2005–2008 models, Acura offered an A-Spec package for the RL. The dealer-installed package consisted of a body kit, badging, revised suspension and different wheels. The package was first announced at a late 2004 Specialty Equipment Market Association (SEMA) trade show in Las Vegas. The A-Spec package for sale was distinctly different from the Acura RL A-Spec Concept Vehicle announced and shown as a striking dark red one-of-a-kind custom creation in early 2005 at the Detroit Auto Show.

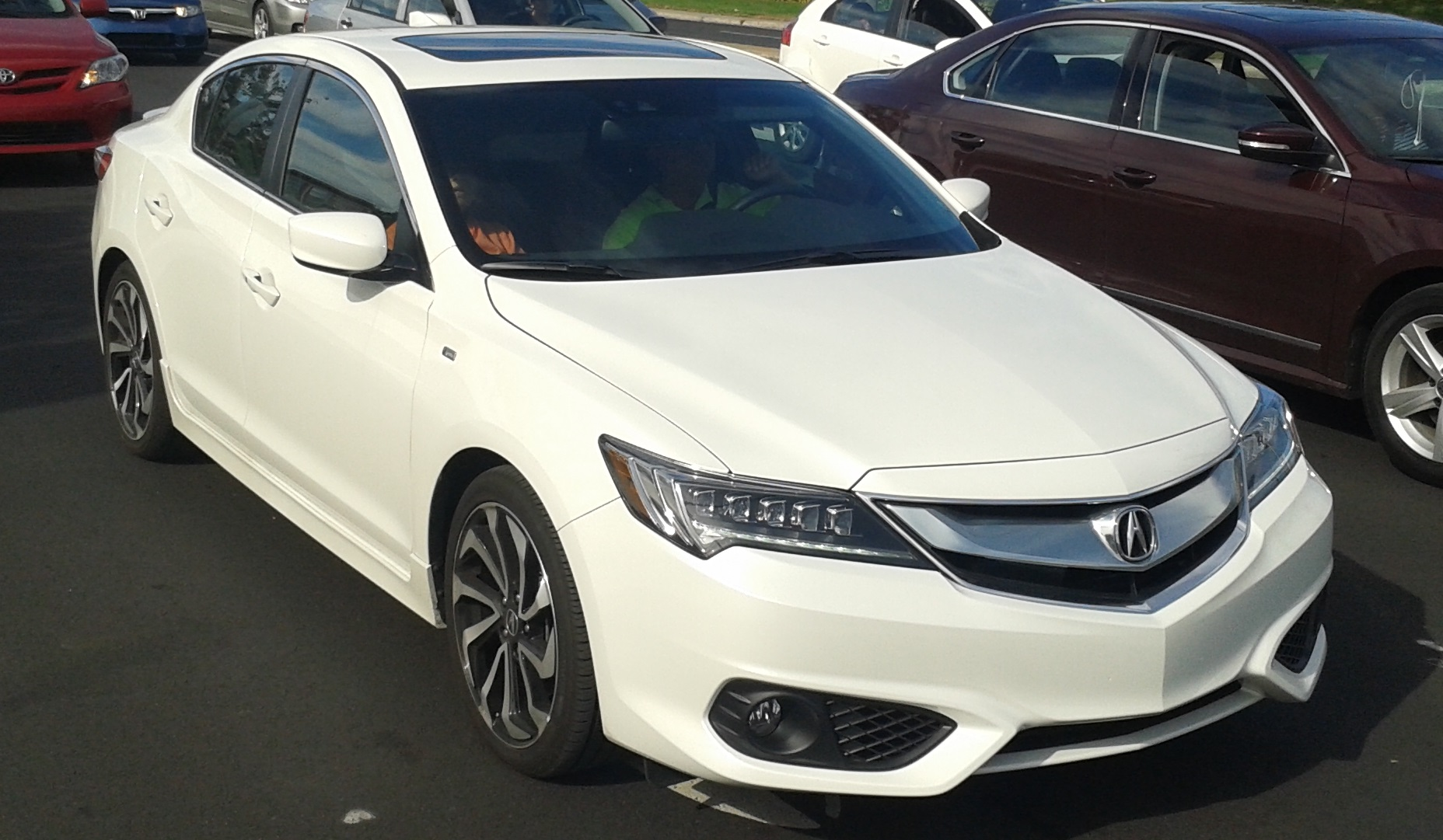
Acura ILX A-Spec

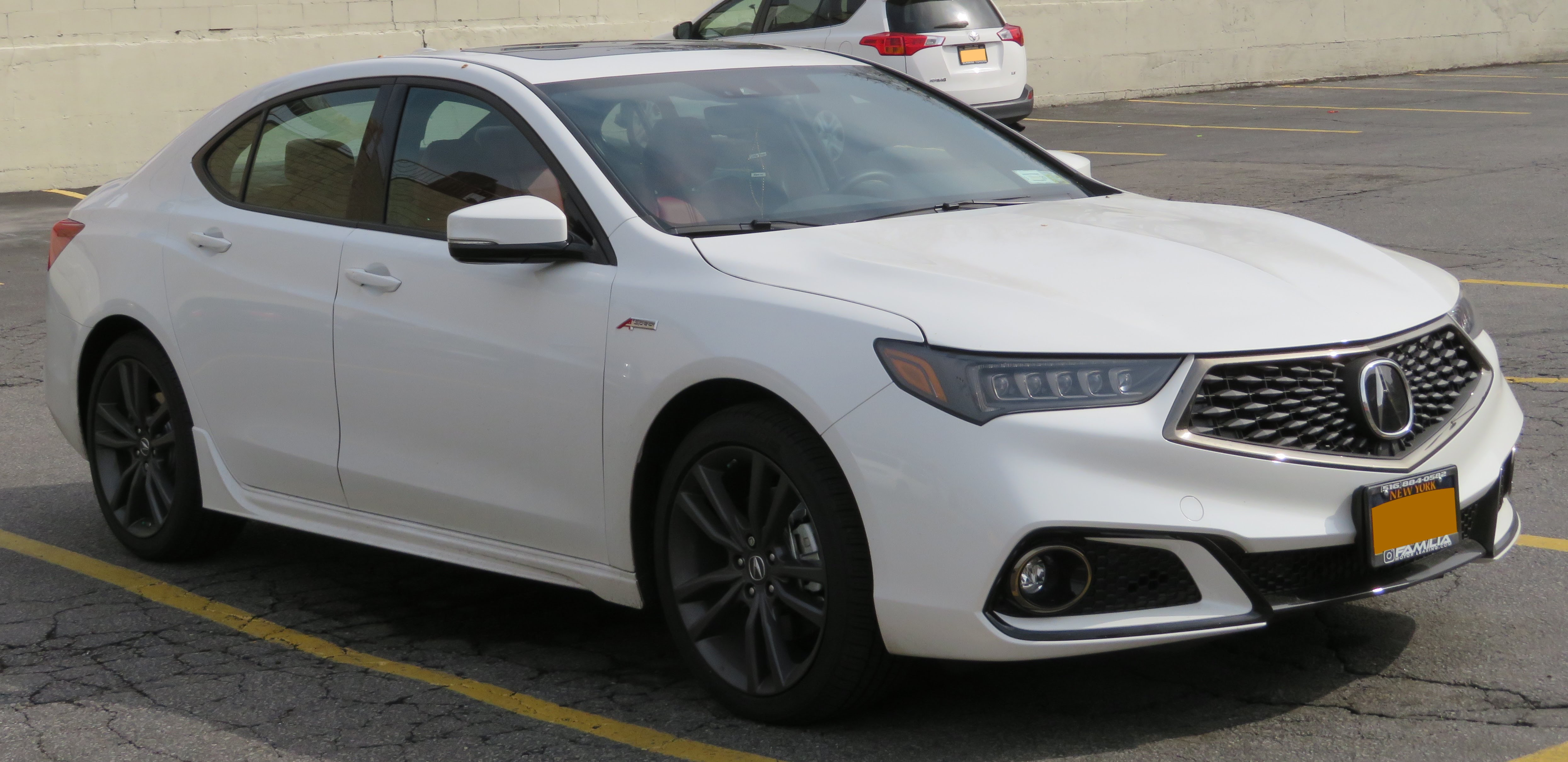
Acura TLX A-Spec

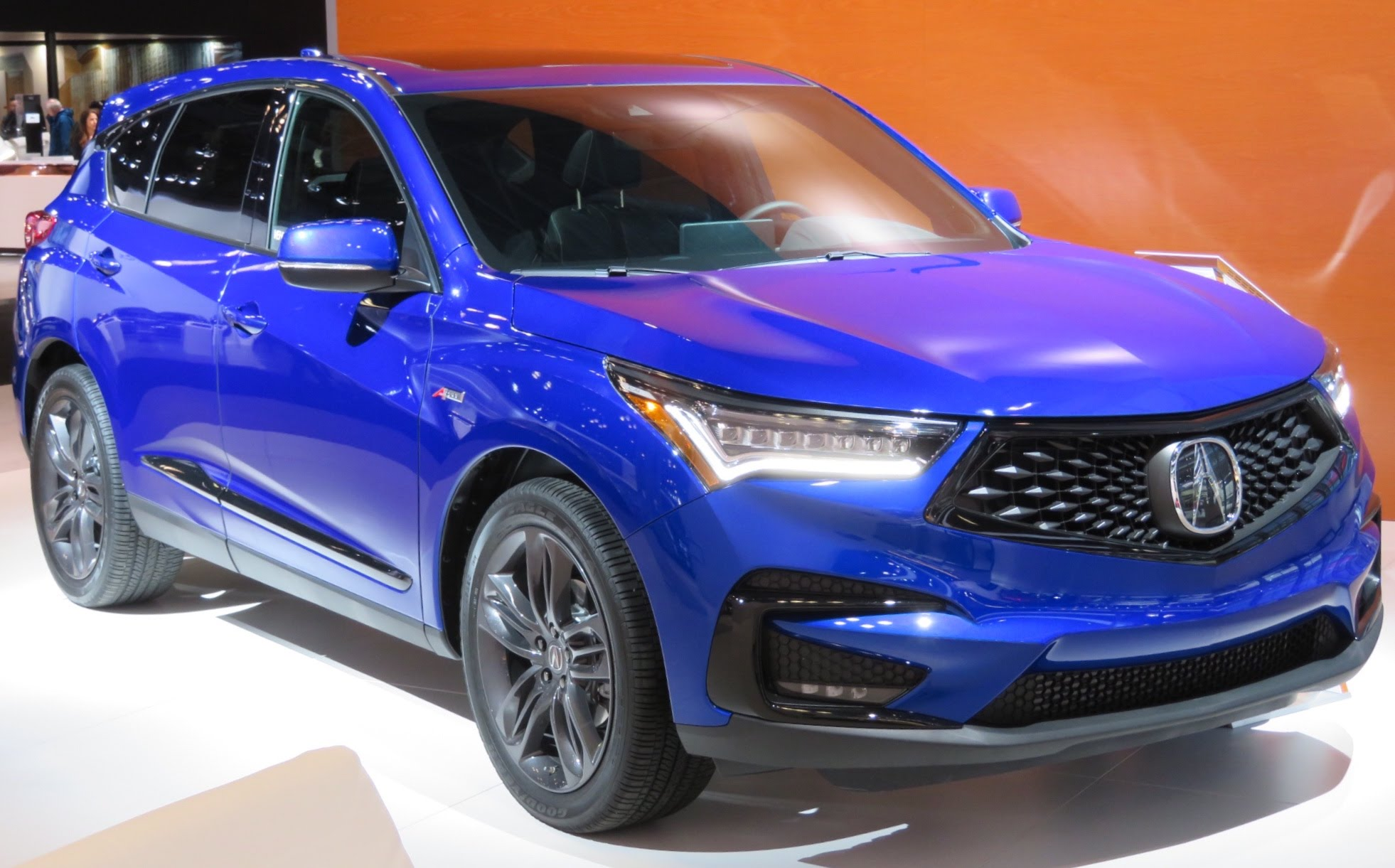
Acura RDX A-Spec

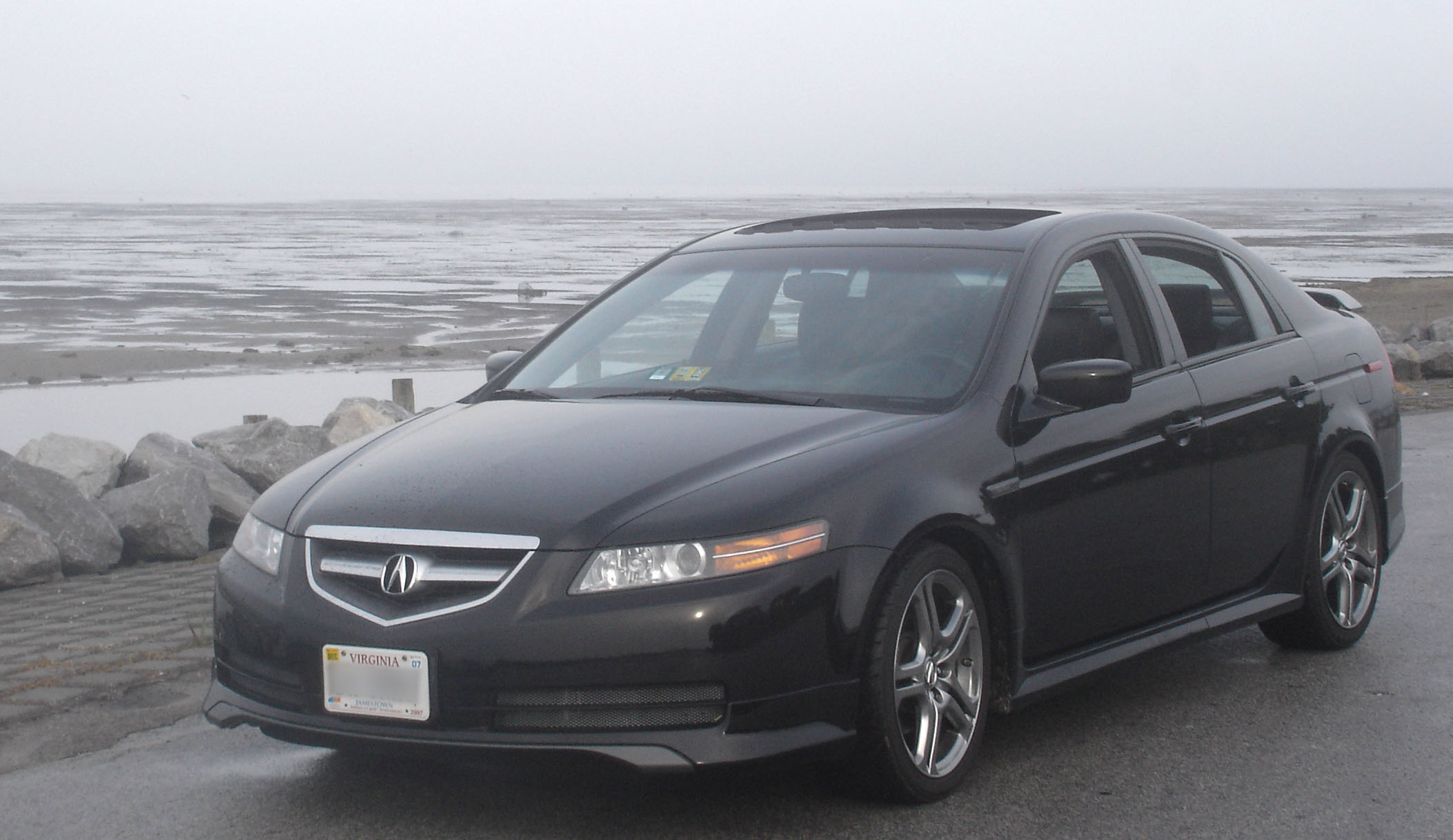
Acura TL A-Spec

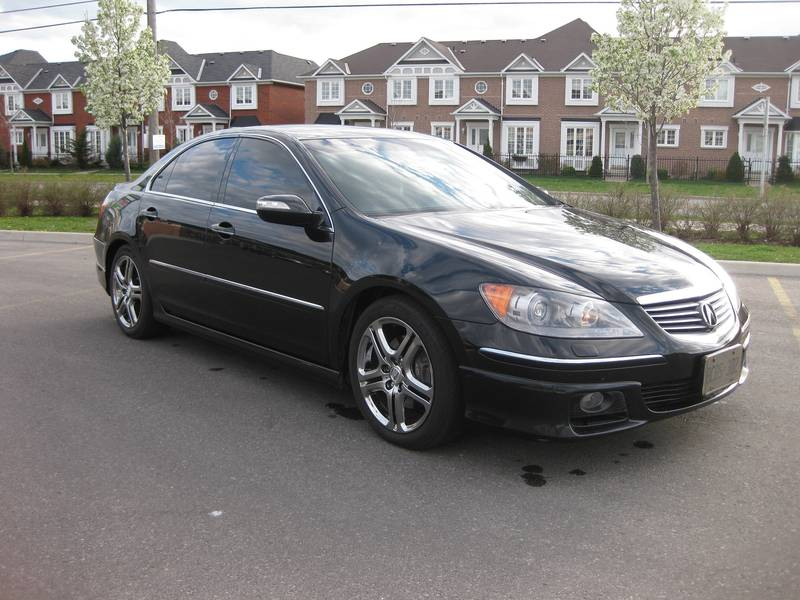
Acura RL A-Spec

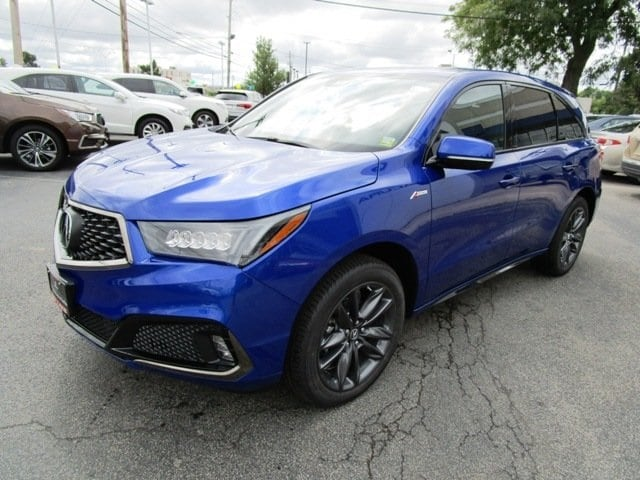
Acura MDX A-Spec

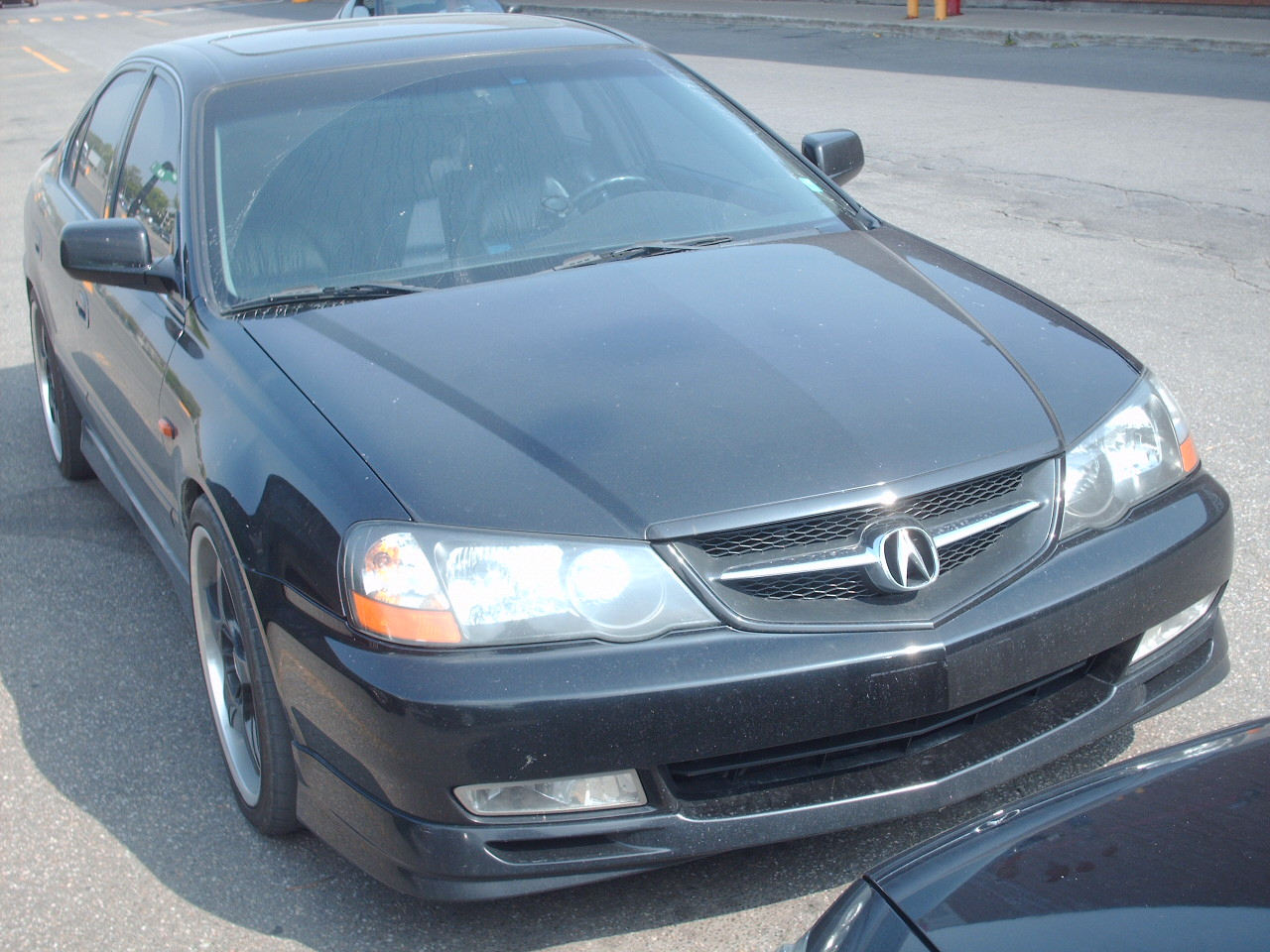
Acura TL A-Spec (Canada only)

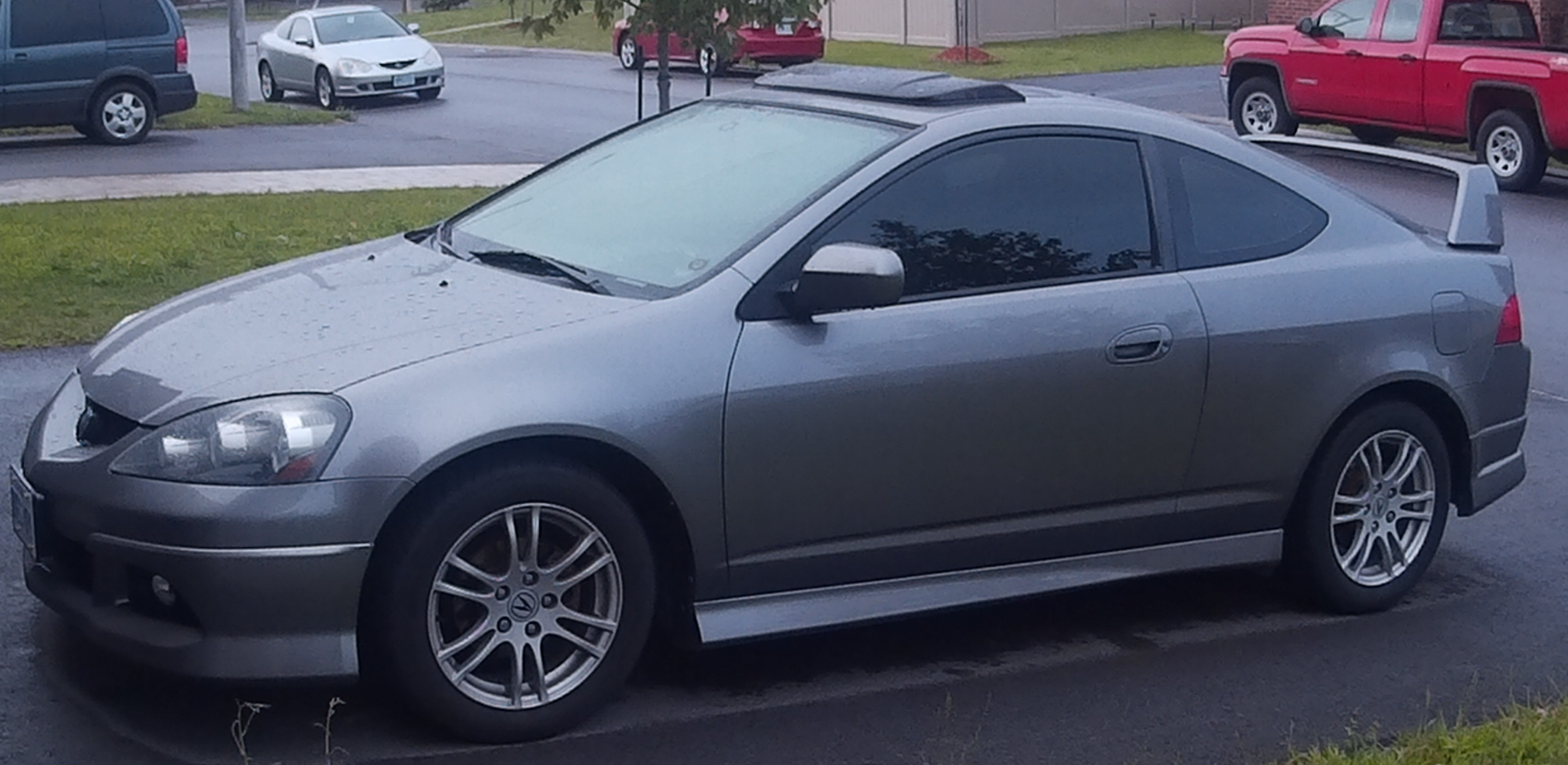
Acura RSX A-Spec
