= Acura ILX =

Compact luxury sedan by Acura (2013–2022)

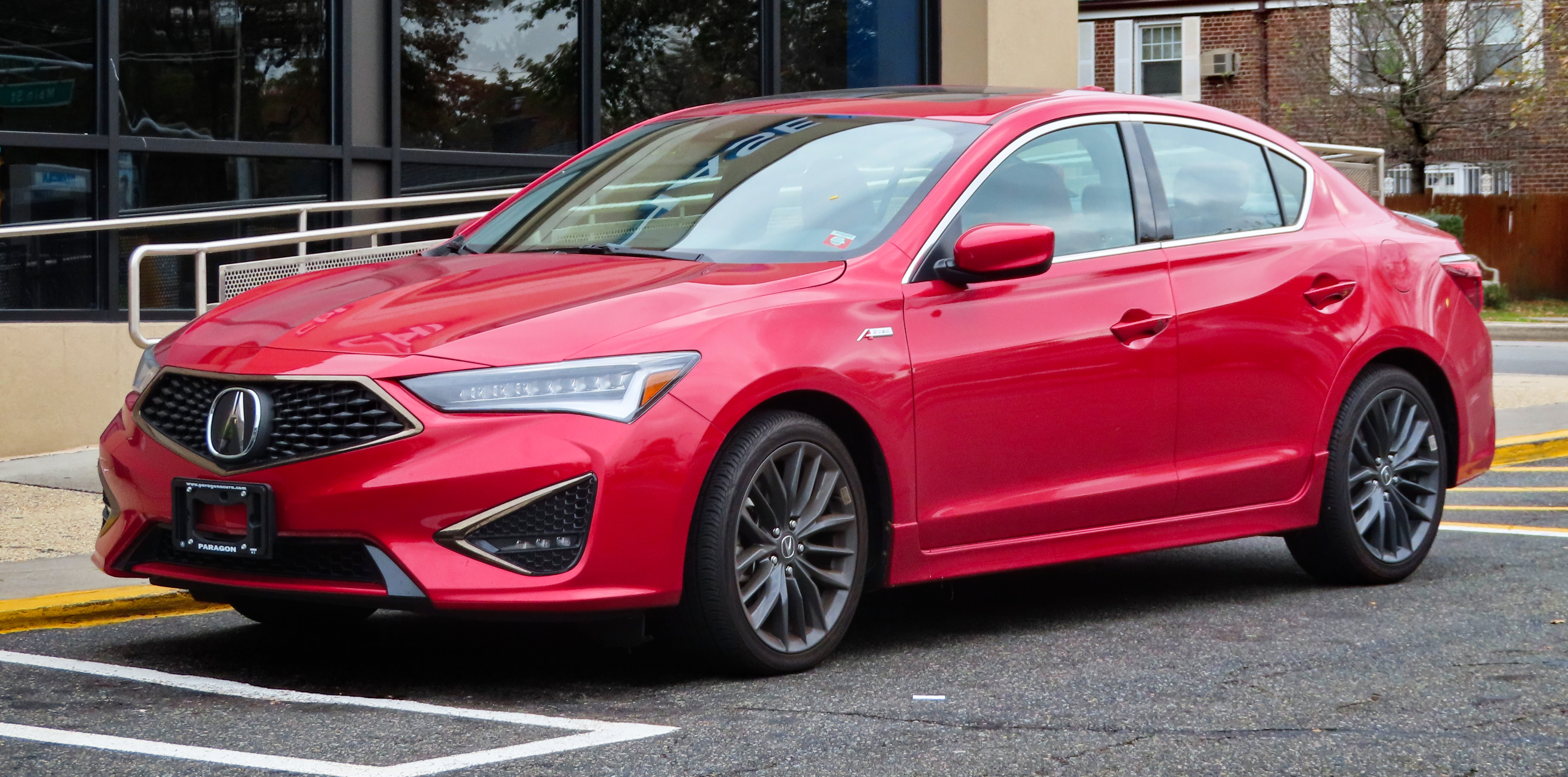
- 2019 Acura ILX A-Spec

Overview
- Manufacturer: Honda
- Model code: DE1/2/3
- Production: 2012–2022; 2012–2014 (ILX Hybrid)
- Model years: 2013–2022; 2013–2014 (ILX Hybrid)
- Assembly: United States: Greensburg, Indiana (Honda Manufacturing of Indiana: April 2012 – November 2014); Marysville, Ohio (Marysville Auto Plant: 2015–2022)

Body and chassis
- Class: Compact executive car (C)
- Body style: 4-door sedan
- Layout: Front-engine, front-wheel drive
- Platform: Honda C-5
- Related: Honda Civic

Powertrain
- Engine: 1.5 L LEA I4 (hybrid; 2013–2014); 2.0 L R20A I4 (5AT; 2013–2015); 2.4 L K24Z7 I4 (6MT; 2013–2015); 2.4 L K24V7 I4 (2016–2022)
- Electric motor: MF6 DC synchronous
- Transmission: 5-speed automatic (2.0 L; 2013–2015); 6-speed manual (2.4 L; 2013–2015); 8-speed dual-clutch (2.4 L; 2016–2022); CVT (1.5 L hybrid; 2013–2014)
- Hybrid drivetrain: IMA parallel hybrid
- Battery: Lithium Ion

Dimensions
- Wheelbase: 105.1 in (2,670 mm)
- Length: 179.1 in (4,549 mm) (2013–2015); 181.9 in (4,620 mm) (2016–2018); 182.2 in (4,628 mm) (2019–2022)
- Width: 70.6 in (1,793 mm)
- Height: 55.6 in (1,412 mm)
- Curb weight: 2,910–2,954 lb (1,320–1,340 kg) (2.0 L); 2,958 lb (1,342 kg) (1.5 L hybrid); 2,978–3,144 lb (1,351–1,426 kg) (2.4 L)

Chronology
- Predecessor: Acura CSX (Canada only); Acura TSX (as entry-level in the US)
- Successor: Acura Integra (DE)

The Acura ILX is a compact executive car manufactured and marketed by Honda under the Acura brand for the 2013–2022 model years, based on the ninth-generation Civic sedan. The ILX replaced the Canadian market exclusive Acura CSX. The gasoline-electric hybrid version was Acura's first.

== Overview ==
The concept version was unveiled at the 2012 North American International Auto Show, the production version was presented in the 2012 Chicago Auto Show. The ILX introduces a new design that Acura calls "aero-fused dynamics". Mass production commenced on April 23, 2012 at Honda's assembly facility in Greensburg, Indiana and U.S. sales began on May 22, 2012. Like other Acura models, the ILX was not offered for sale on the Japanese domestic market.

The ILX's body in white uses 59% high strength steel ranging from 440 to 980 MPa yield strength grades, aluminum was used for the hood and front bumper beam. Compared to the Civic, the ILX uses Acura's "Amplitude Reactive" dampers and a larger more rigid steering shaft for improved handling and ride quality characteristics.

Options are grouped into Premium and Technology packages and include leather upholstery, 17-inch alloy wheels, navigation system, premium audio system with SiriusXM satellite radio, and high intensity discharge headlamps. Both option packages include a multi-view rear backup camera with regular, wide-angle, and top-down modes.

For the 2014 model year, the ILX became standard with 17-inch wheels, leather interior, heated front seats, an eight-way power driver's seat, tri-angle backup camera and audio subwoofer with Active Noise Cancellation.

In July 2014, for the 2015 model year, the ILX Hybrid was discontinued due to slow sales. Through May 2014, only 2,660 Hybrid units were sold since its introduction.

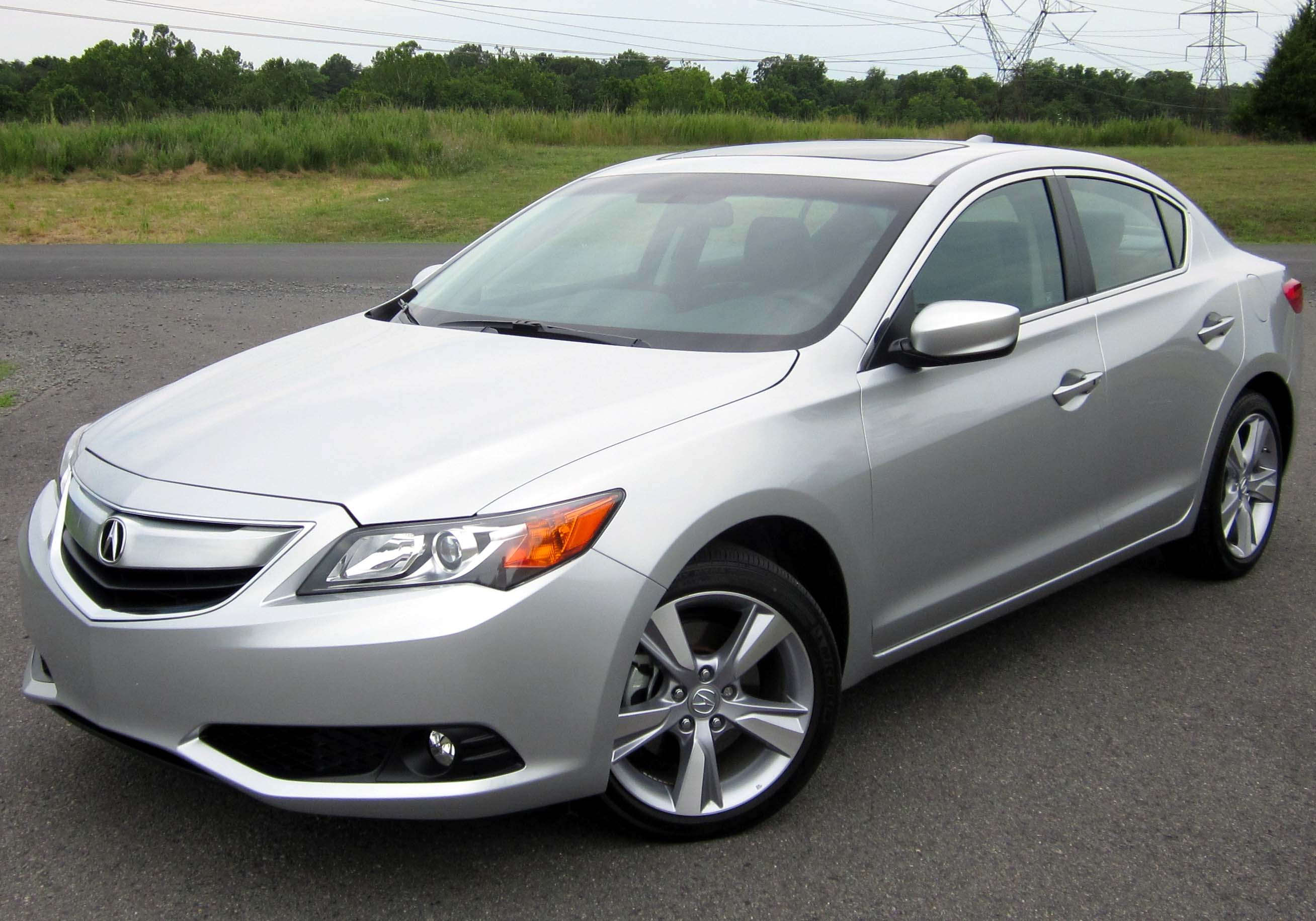
2013 Acura ILX

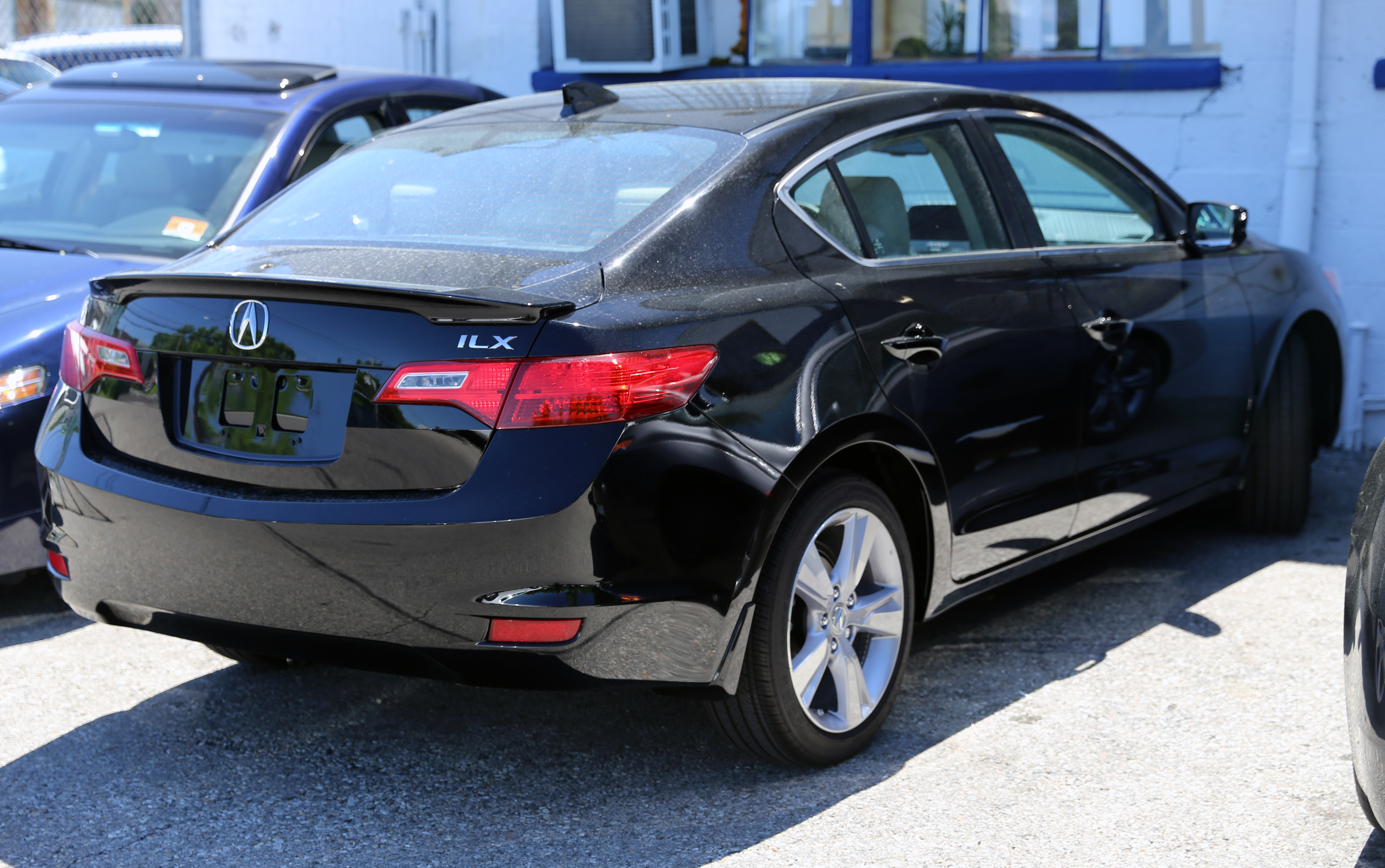
Rear view

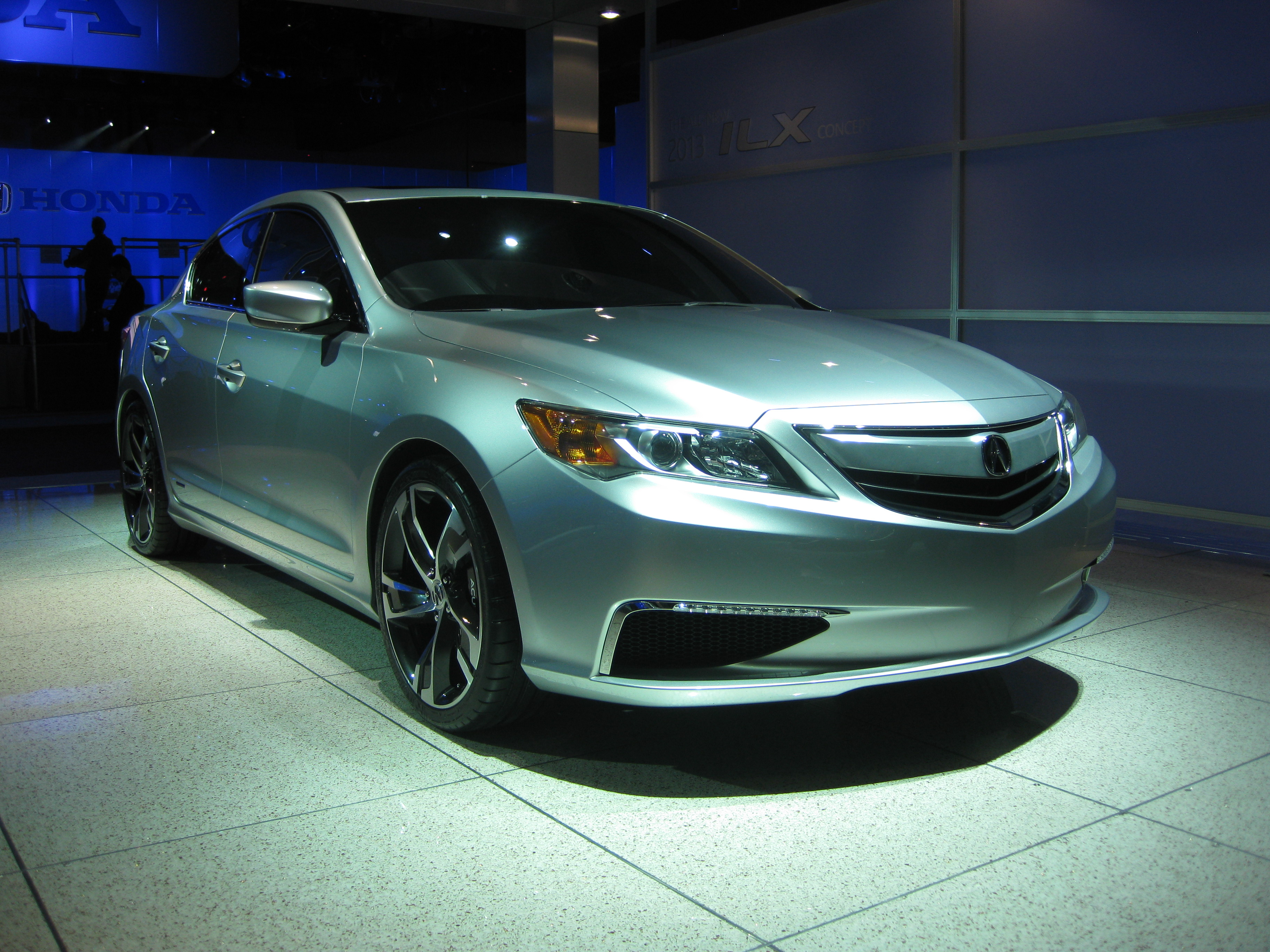
Acura ILX concept car at the 2012 North American International Auto Show

=== 2016 facelift ===
The refreshed 2016 ILX was unveiled during November 2014 at the Los Angeles Auto Show, and went on sale in February 2015 for the 2016 model year. It became exclusively powered with an "Earth Dreams" direct injected 2.4-liter four-cylinder DOHC i-VTEC gasoline engine mated to an 8-speed dual-clutch transmission, a very closely related powertrain to that of the TLX, first introduced in 2014 (as a 2015 model). The manual transmission ILX was also discontinued with the release of the facelift. Only around 4% of ILX sold had manual transmissions from the 2013-2015 model years. "Jewel Eye" LED headlamps (low and high beams, DRL pipe and amber turn signals) similar to those on other Acura models (RLX, MDX and TLX) are standard, along with new LED tail lamps. A new "A-Spec" trim was offered, which included sporty exterior and interior styling enhancements. Production of the 2016 ILX began during January 2015 moving to the Marysville Auto Plant in Marysville, Ohio.

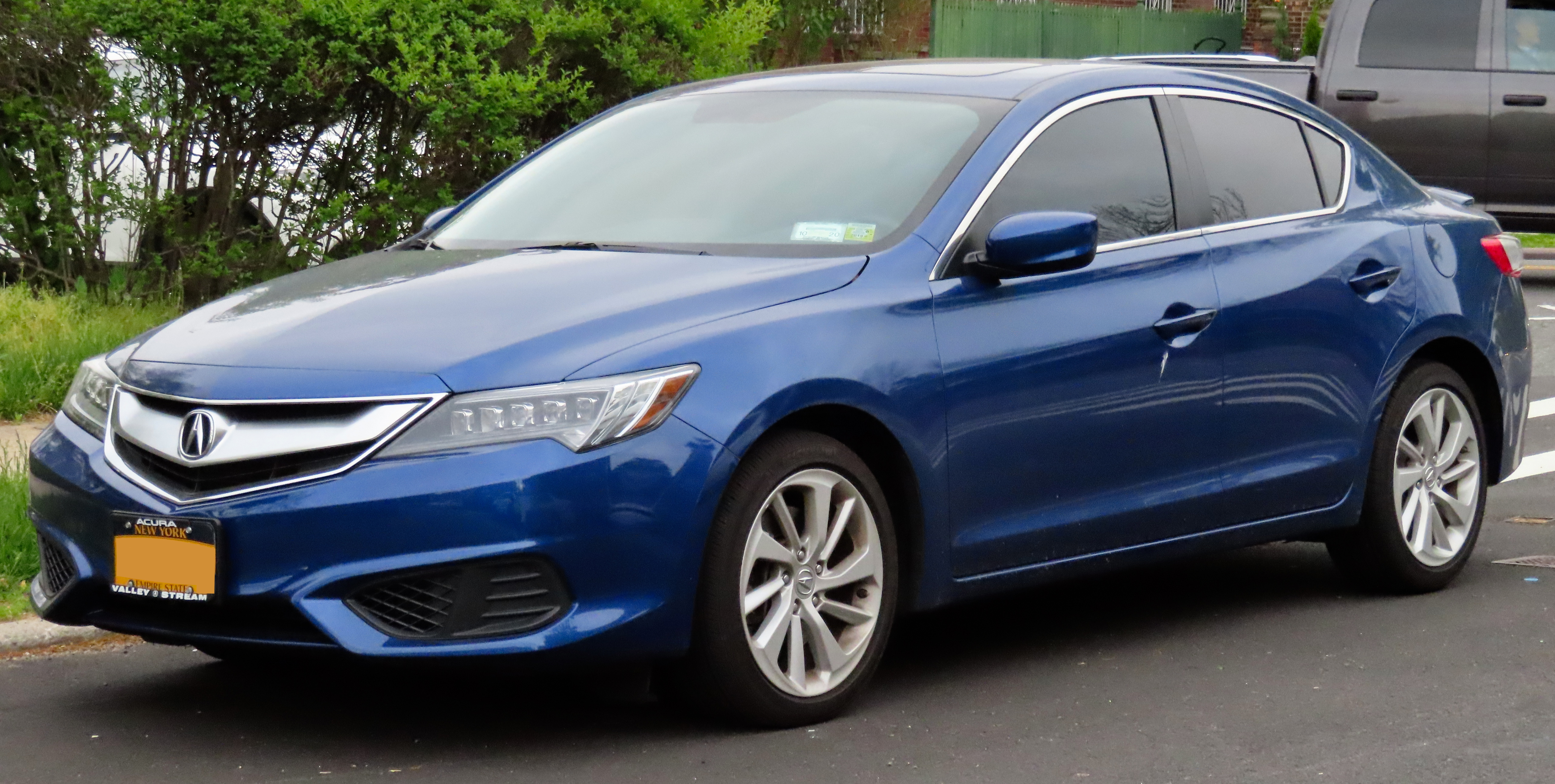
2016 Acura ILX

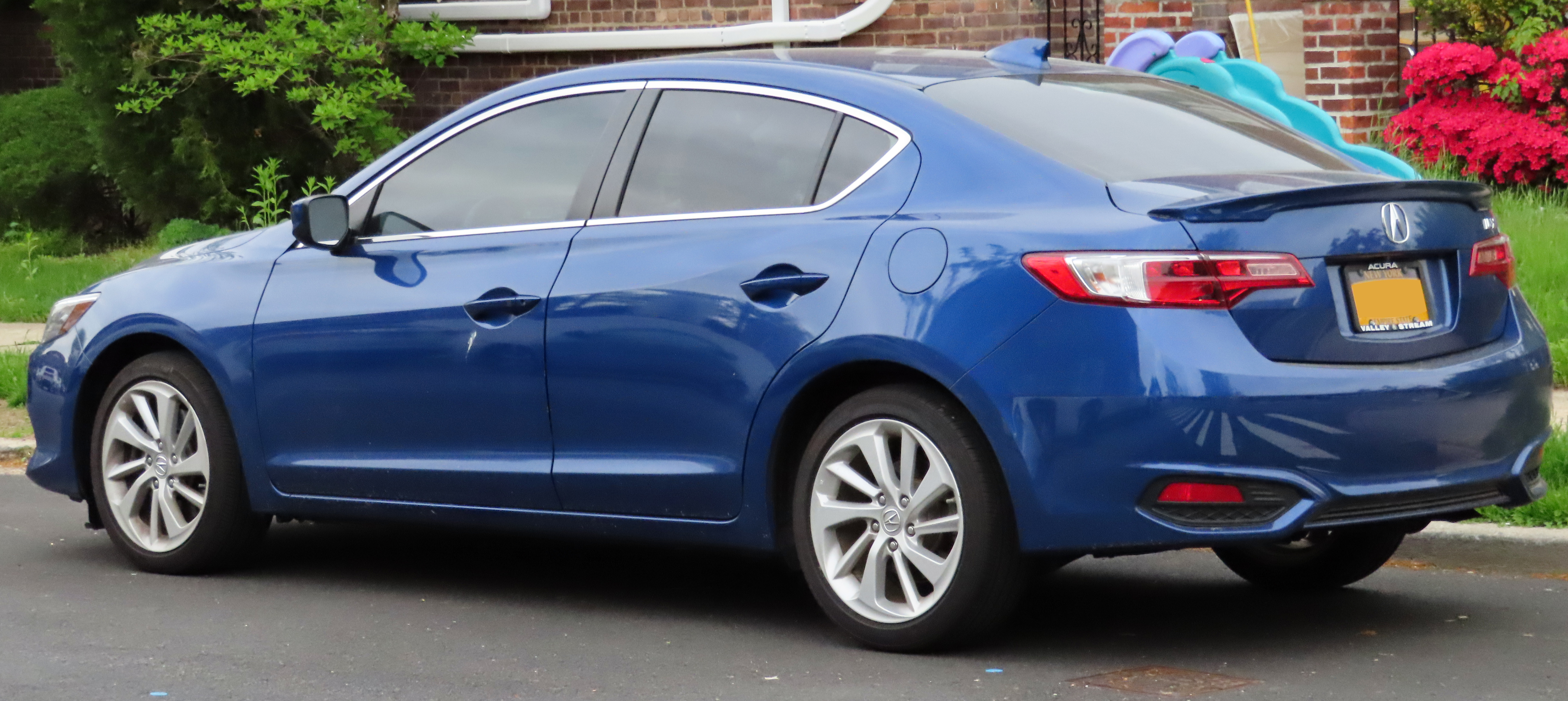
Rear view

=== 2019 facelift ===
In September 2018, Acura revealed a second facelift for the ILX for the 2019 model year, incorporating what the company markets as its "Diamond Pentagon" grille. The headlights are revised along with front bumper. In the rear of the ILX, the taillights are revised, and the license plate has been dropped from the trunk to the rear bumper. In the interior, the overall design has revised seats, with the availability of red leather (only on the A-Spec), and an updated infotainment system — the latter 30% faster. AcuraWatch became standard on all ILX models. The powertrain has remained the same for 2019. The ILX A-Spec comes with 18-inch wheels, a sportier exterior design, red or black leather seats with ultrasuede inserts, aluminum pedals, and other equipment.

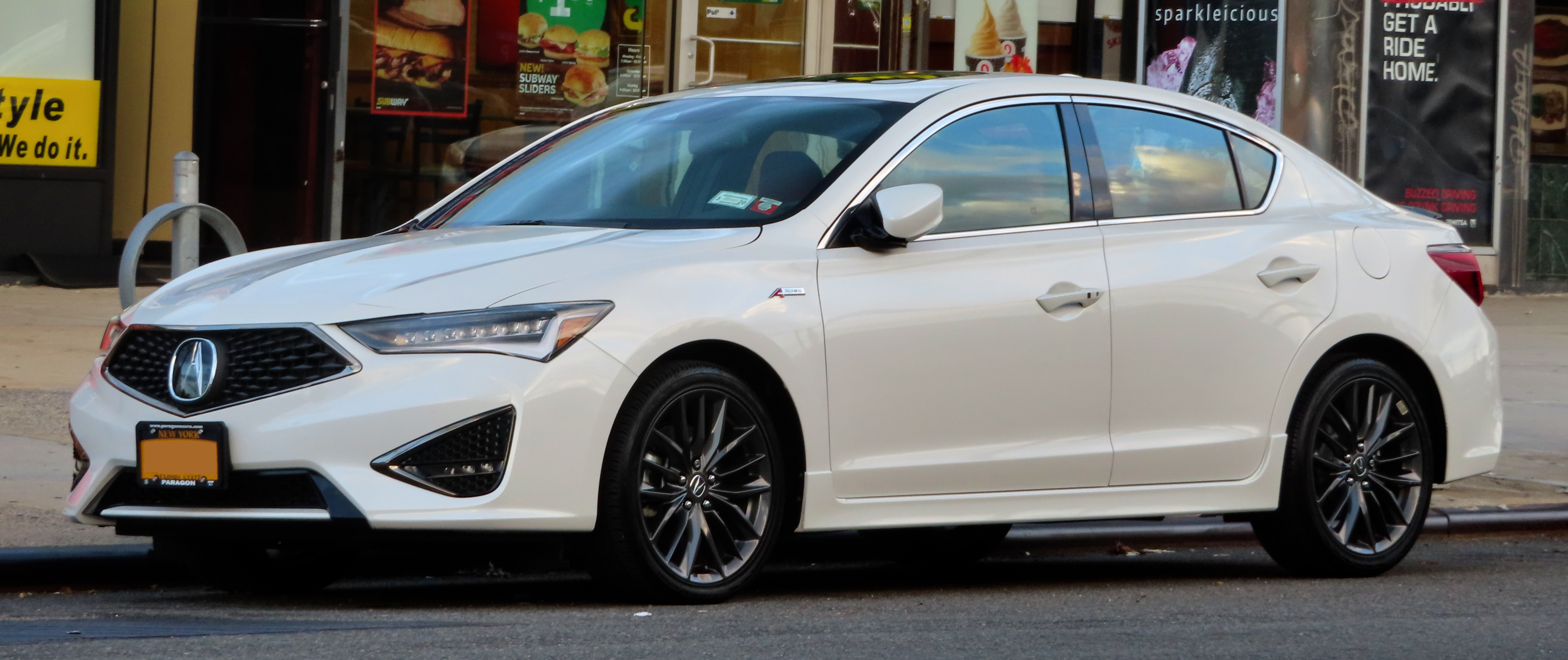
2019 Acura ILX

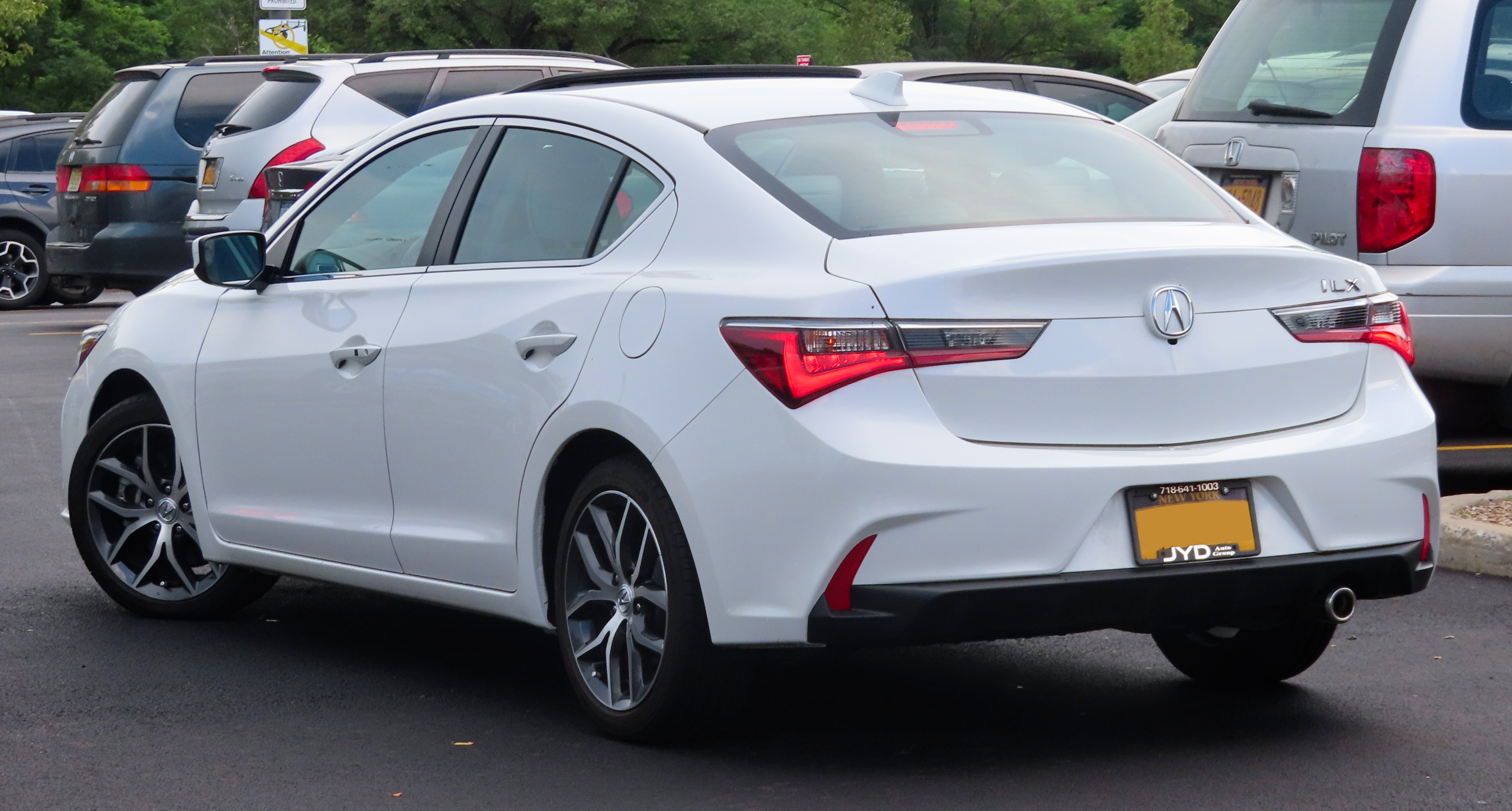
Rear view

=== Safety ===
NHTSA scores
Overall:	5/5 stars
Frontal Driver:	4/5 stars
Frontal Passenger:	4/5 stars
Side Driver:	5/5 stars
Side Passenger:	5/5 stars
Side Pole Driver:	/ 2013-2015
Side Pole Driver:	/ 2016
Rollover:	/ 10.7%

IIHS scores
Moderate overlap frontal offset	Good
Small overlap frontal offset (2013–15)	Not tested
Small overlap frontal offset (2016- models)	Good
Side impact	Good
Roof strength	Good

== Specifications ==
Honda had offered several different four-cylinder gasoline engines in the ILX, similar to those in the CSX, TSX, and Civic Si. The hybrid model (available for the 2013 through 2014 model years and Acura's first hybrid), used a 1.5-liter I4 and shared its gas/electric powertrain with Honda's Civic Hybrid producing 111 hp (83 kW; 113 PS) at 5,500 rpm and 127 lb⋅ft (172 N⋅m) of torque between 1,000 and 3,000 rpm.

2013–2015

- 2.0 L (DE1) 5-speed Auto: 150 hp (112 kW) at 6,500 rpm and 140 lb⋅ft (190 N⋅m) of torque at 4,300 rpm
- 2.4 L (DE2) 6-speed Manual: 201 hp (150 kW) at 7,000 rpm and 170 lb⋅ft (230 N⋅m) of torque at 4,300 rpm
- 1.5 L (DE3) CVT: 111 hp (83 kW) at 5,500 rpm and 127 lb⋅ft (172 N⋅m) of torque between 1,000 and 3,000 rpm

2016–2022

- 2.4 L (DE2) 8-speed DCT: 201 hp (150 kW) at 6,800 rpm and 180 lb⋅ft (244 N⋅m) of torque at 3,800 rpm

The ILX originally featured a 2.0-liter I4 gasoline engine produces 150 hp mated to a 5-speed automatic transmission, or a version of the Civic Si's 201 hp 2.4-liter I4 gasoline engine mated to a 6-speed manual. The ILX Hybrid model featured a 1.5-liter I4 gasoline engine produces 111 hp hybrid from the Civic Hybrid, EPA fuel economy rating of the hybrid version is 39 mpg_{‑US} (6.0 L/100 km; 47 mpg_{‑imp}) for city and 38 mpg_{‑US} (6.2 L/100 km; 46 mpg_{‑imp}) on highway driving. From 2016, the ILX was offered only with the 2.4-liter I4 engine paired with the 8 speed DCT.

== Discontinuation ==
The ILX was discontinued in February 2022 after the 2022 model year, with the eleventh-generation Honda Civic-based Integra liftback replacing it as the brand's entry-level offering.

== Sales ==
Calendar year	US	Canada	Mexico
2012	12,250 (incl. 972 hybrid)	2,260	357
2013	20,430 (incl. 1,461 hybrid)	3,190	589
2014	17,850 (incl. 379 hybrid)	2,750	464
2015	18,530	2,550	374
2016	14,597	2,459	295
2017	11,757	2,047	224
2018	11,273	1,903	167
2019	14,685	1,871	161
2020	13,414	774	78
2021	13,900	870	5
2022	6,296		-
