= Acura RSX =

Automobile nameplate by Honda

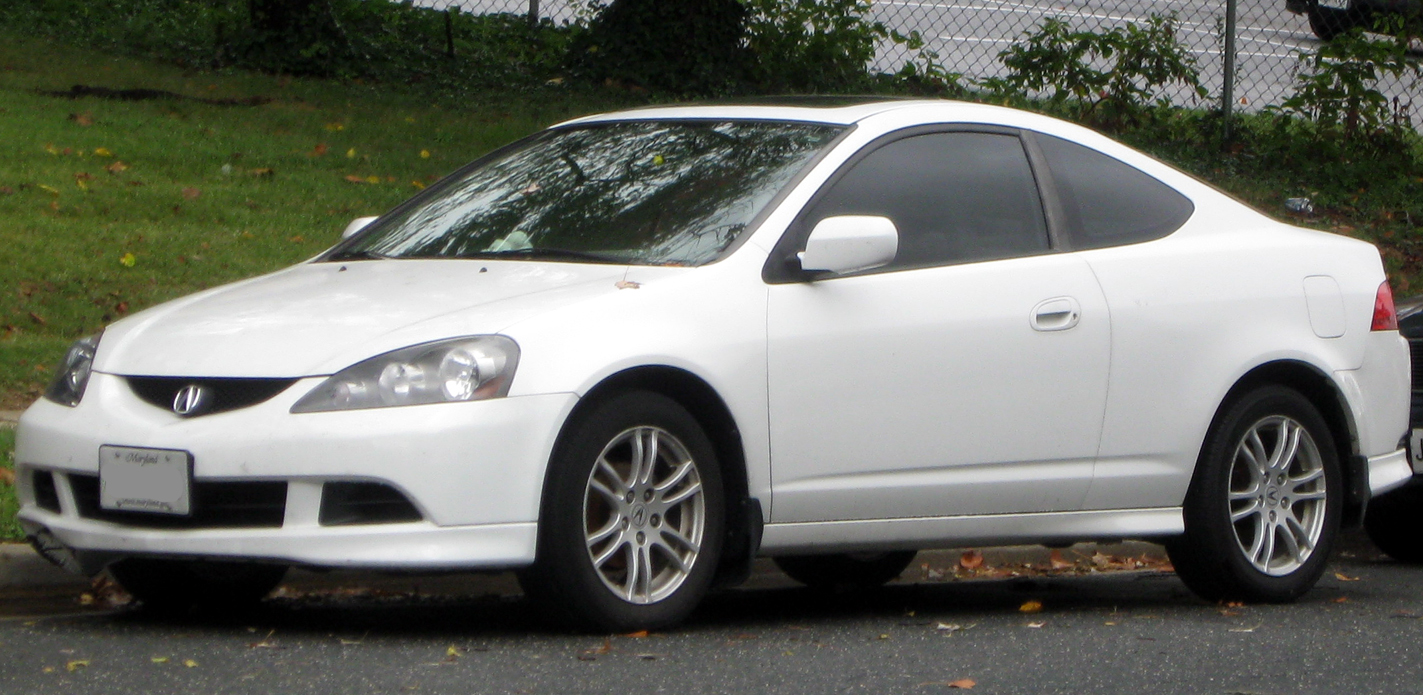
- Acura RSX (DC5)

Overview
- Manufacturer: Honda
- Also called: Honda Integra (2001–2006)
- Production: July 2001 – August 2006; 2026 (cancelled)
- Model years: 2002–2006; 2027 (cancelled)

Body and chassis
- Class: Sport compact (2001–2006); Compact luxury crossover SUV (2026)
- Body style: 3-door liftback coupe (2001–2006); 5-door coupe SUV (2026)

The Acura RSX is an automobile nameplate used by Honda for its upmarket brand Acura. The nameplate has been used for two different car models:

- A rebadged Japanese market Honda Integra sold between 2001 and 2006.
- A cancelled battery electric coupe SUV that was slated for production in 2026.

== Liftback coupe (DC5; 2001) ==
The Integra-based RSX was introduced on July 2, 2001 as a replacement for the long-running Acura Integra nameplate. The name was a part of Acura's naming scheme changing the names of its models from recognizable names like "Integra" or "Legend" to alphabetical designations in order for buyers to build more recognition to the marque, and not the individual cars. In the US, it was available in two models: the base model, simply named RSX, and the Type-S.

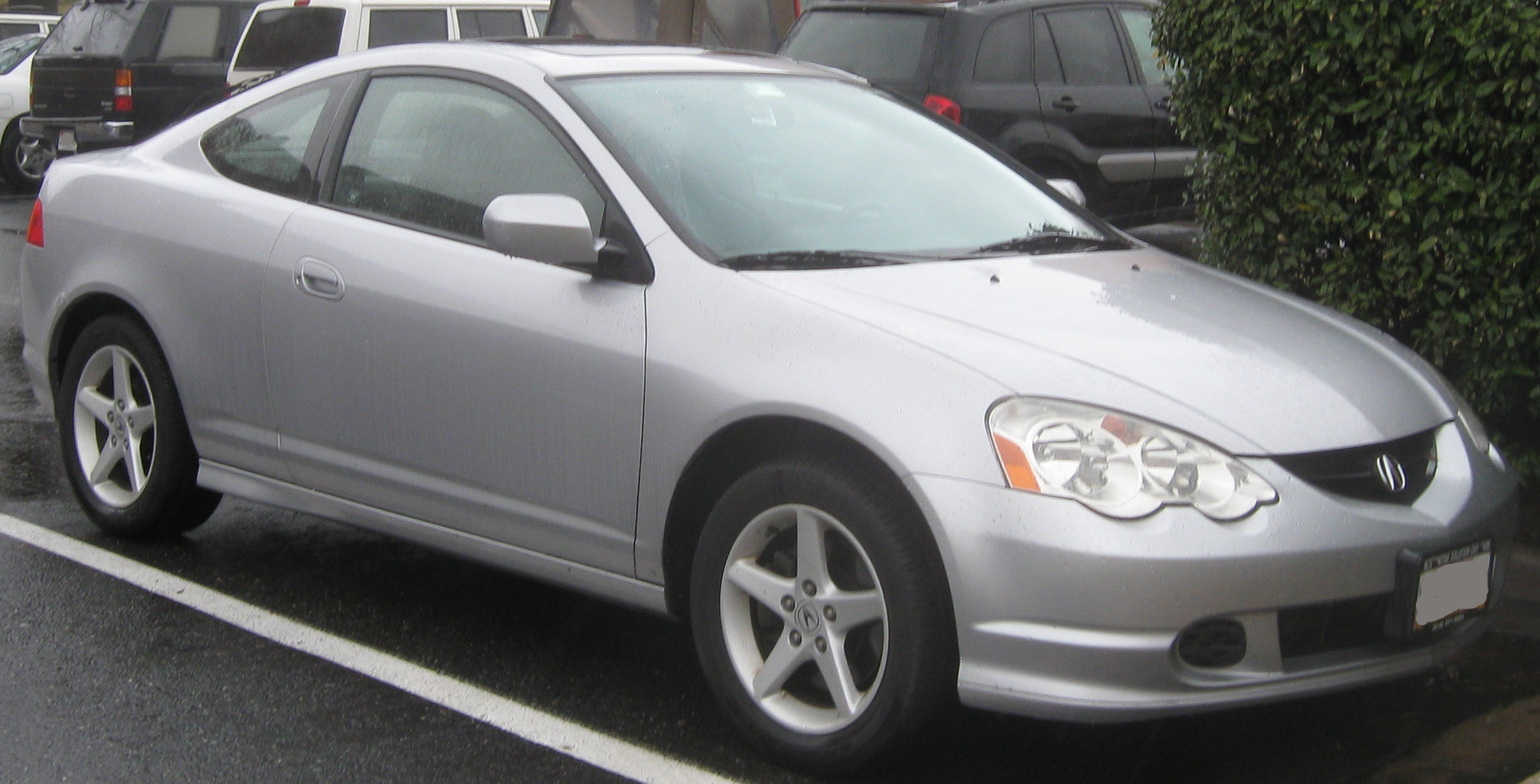
Acura RSX (2002–2004)

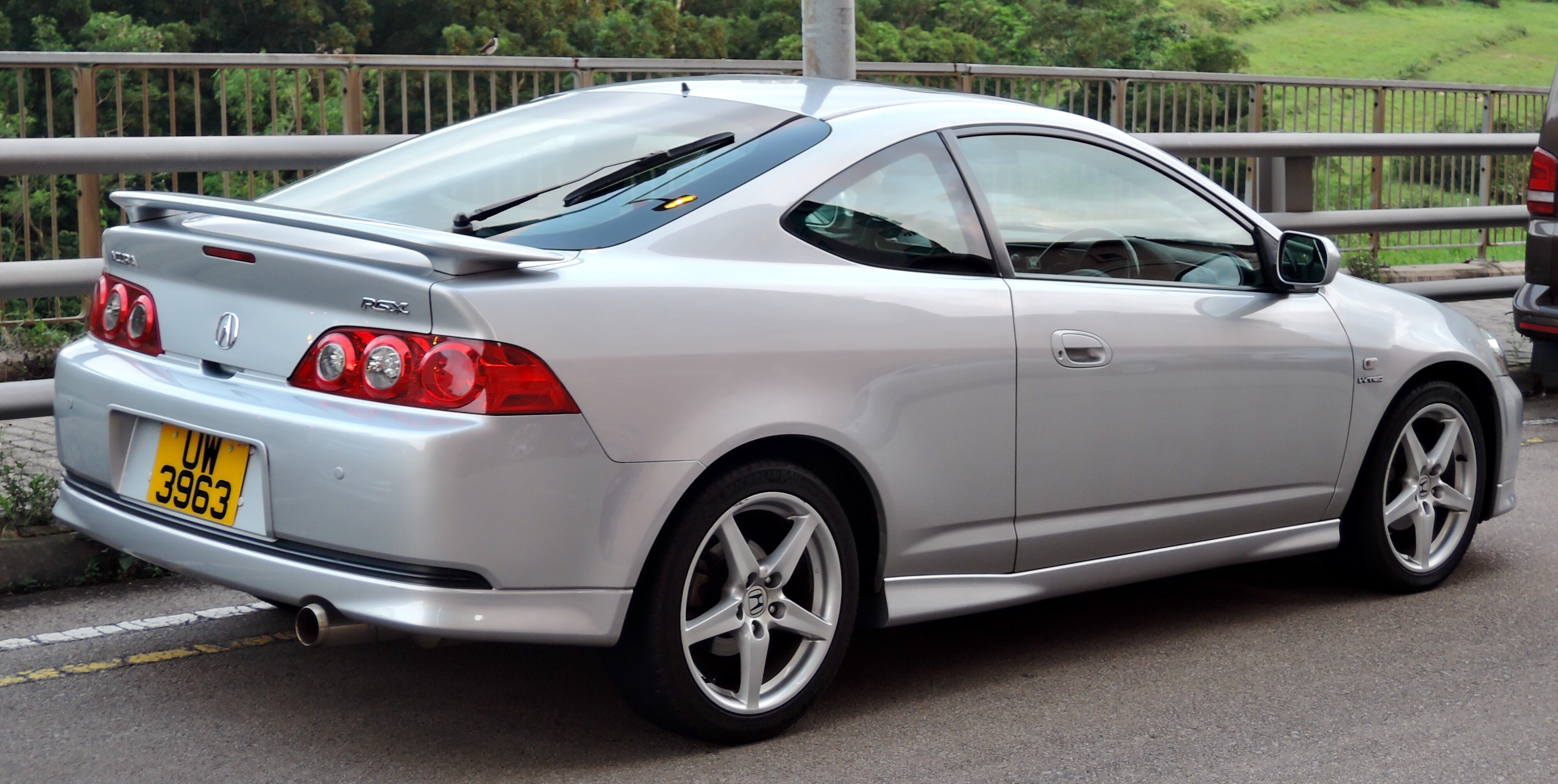
Rear view

== Coupe SUV (2026) ==
Coupe SUV
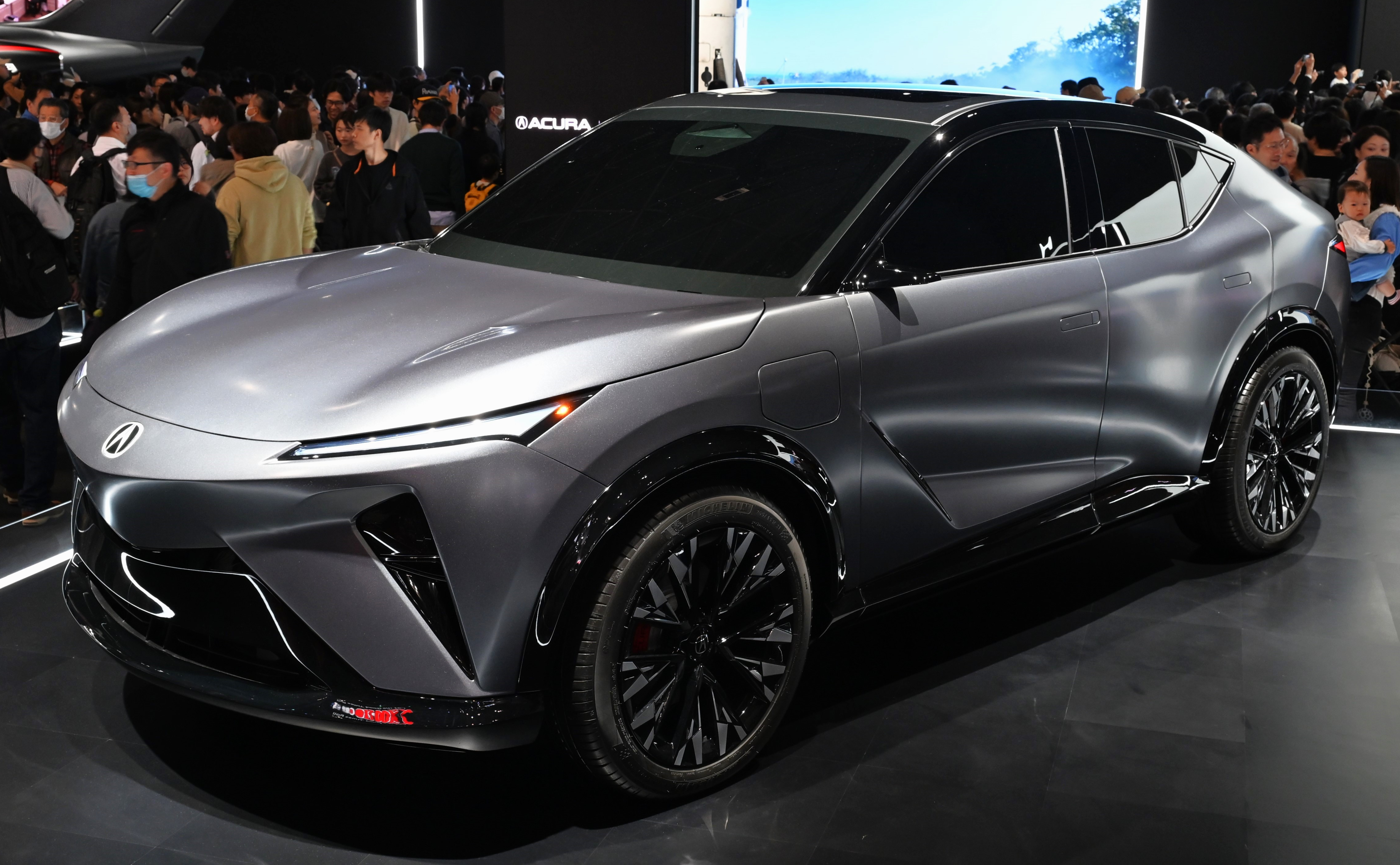
- Acura RSX Prototype

Overview
- Production: 2026 (cancelled)
- Model years: 2027 (cancelled)
- Assembly: United States: Marysville, Ohio (Marysville Auto Plant)

Body and chassis
- Body style: 5-door coupe SUV
- Platform: Zero platform
- Related: Honda 0 Saloon; Honda 0 SUV

The revival of the RSX nameplate was announced on January 15, 2025 as a battery electric coupe SUV. Honda stated it would have slotted below the ZDX in the lineup. Unlike the ZDX which built on the General Motors BEV3 platform, the RSX would have been built on Honda's own Zero platform. The prototype model was introduced at the Monterey Car Week in Monterey, California in August 2025. It was slated to begin production at Honda's Marysville Auto Plant in Marysville, Ohio in early 2026.

In March 2026, Honda cancelled the RSX, along with the Honda 0 Saloon and Honda 0 SUV, due to "the unfavorable impact of changes in U.S. tariff policies" and competitive pressures leading to Honda being "unable to deliver products that offer value for money better than that of newer EV manufacturers".

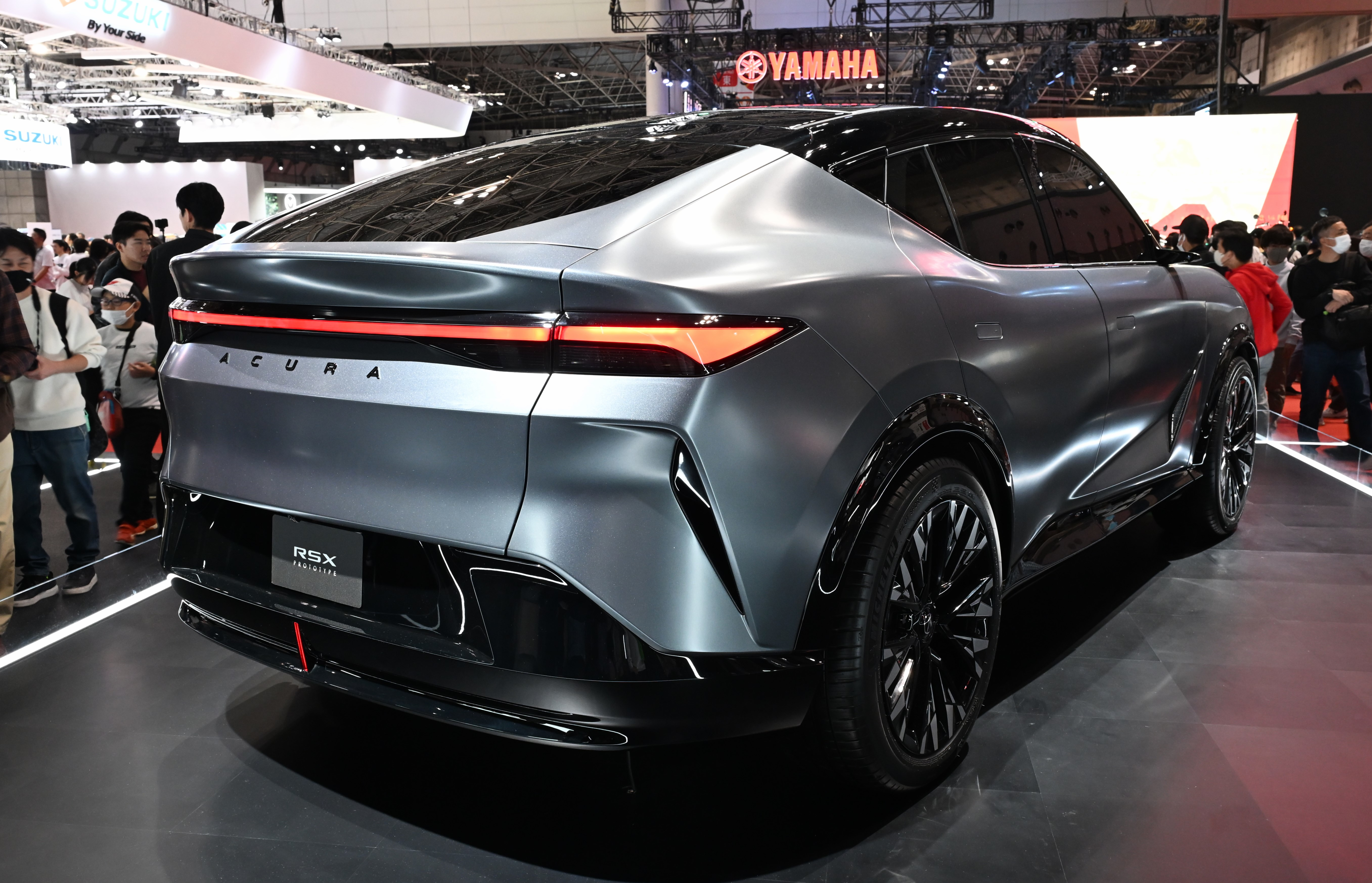
Rear view (Prototype)

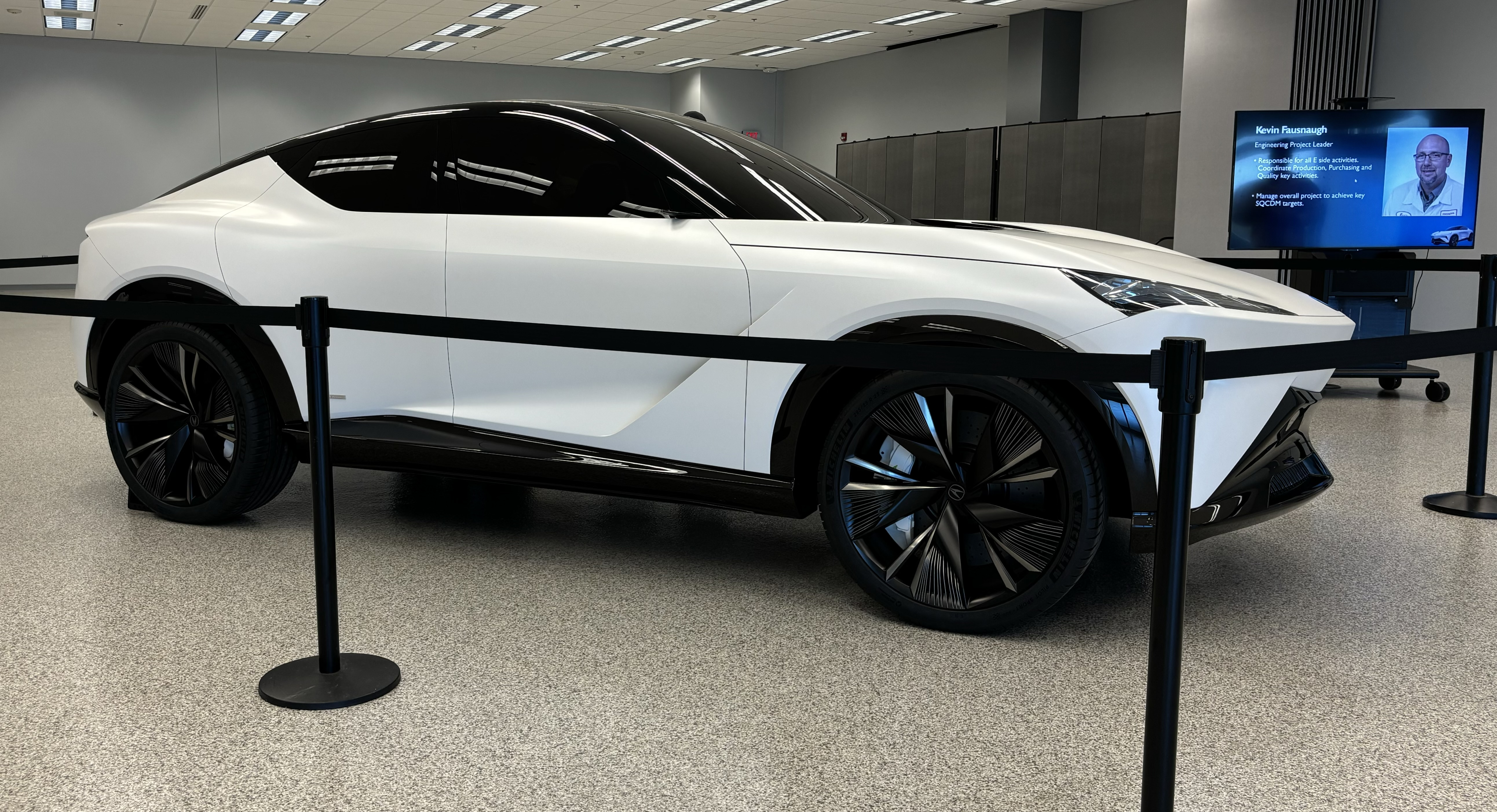
Acura Performance EV concept, which previewed the RSX electric coupe SUV
