= Acura RDX =

Compact luxury crossover SUV

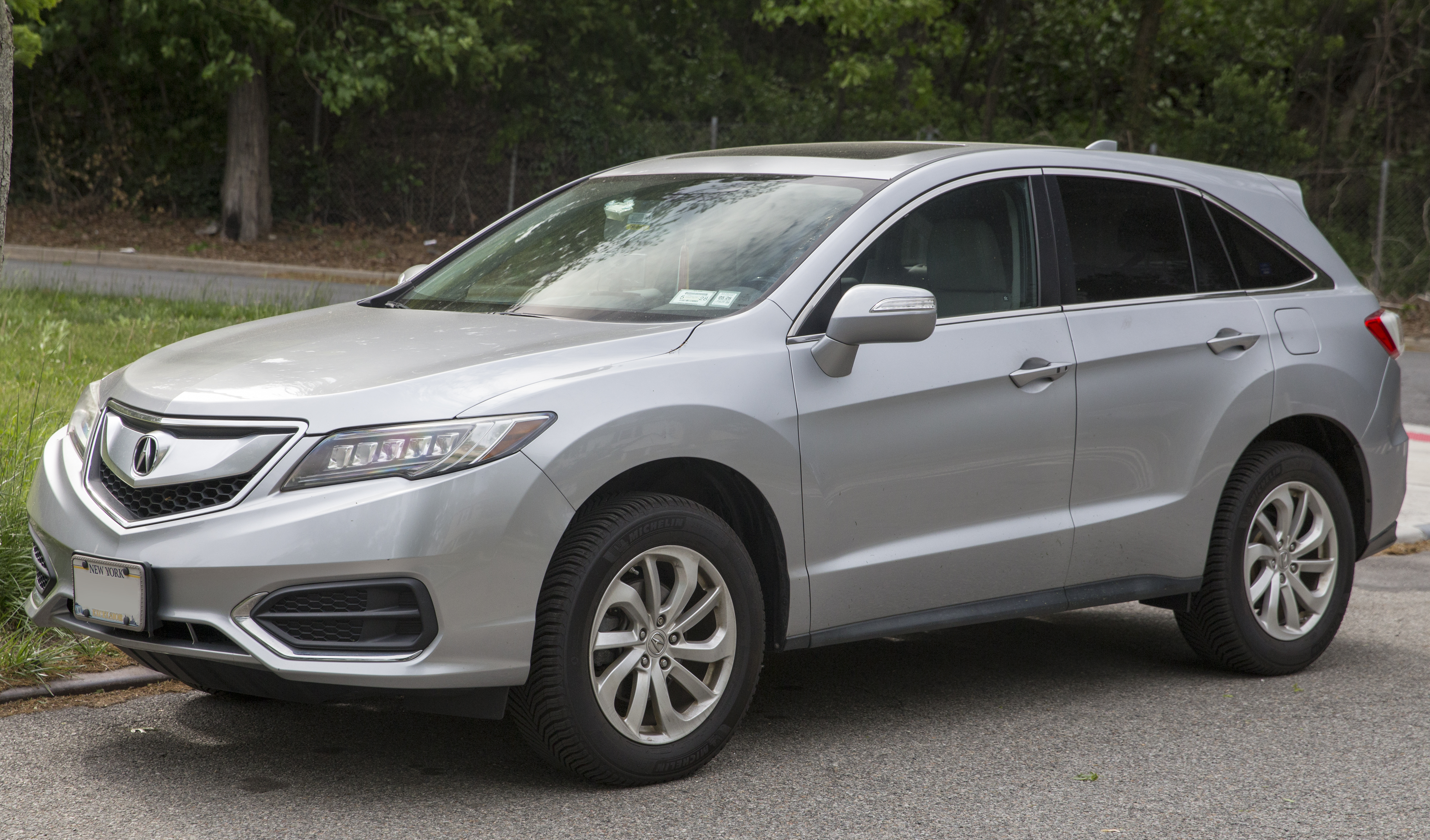
- 2018 Acura RDX (second generation)

Overview
- Manufacturer: Honda
- Production: 2006–2026
- Model years: 2007–2026

Body and chassis
- Class: Compact luxury crossover SUV
- Body style: 5-door SUV
- Related: Honda CR-V

The Acura RDX is a compact luxury crossover SUV produced by Honda for their Acura brand since 2006 for the 2007 model year as the second crossover SUV offering from the brand after the mid-size MDX. Since it was introduced, it has shared its platform with the Honda Civic and CR-V.

== First generation (TB1/2; 2007) ==
First generation
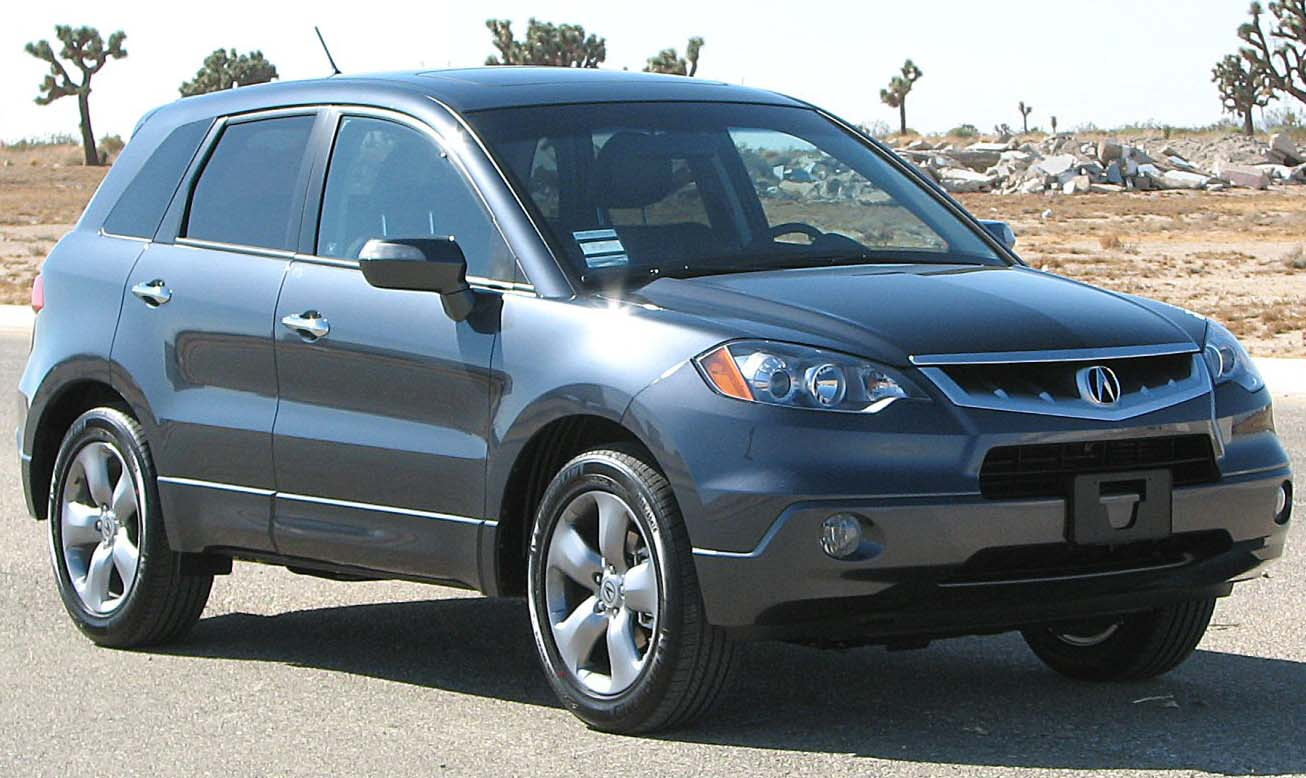
- 2007 Acura RDX

Overview
- Model code: TB1/2
- Production: July 2006–2012
- Model years: 2007–2012
- Assembly: United States: Marysville, Ohio (Marysville Auto Plant)
- Designer: Jon Ikeda (2004)

Body and chassis
- Layout: Front engine, front-wheel-drive, all-wheel-drive (SH-AWD)

Powertrain
- Engine: 2.3 L K23A1 turbo I4
- Transmission: 5-speed automatic

Dimensions
- Wheelbase: 104.3 in (2,649 mm)
- Length: 2007-09: 180.7 in (4,590 mm); 2010-12: 182.5 in (4,636 mm)
- Width: 73.6 in (1,869 mm)
- Height: 65.2 in (1,656 mm)
- Curb weight: 3,968 lb (1,800 kg)

Originally previewed as the Acura RD-X concept car, the production RDX had its debut at the 2006 New York Auto Show and went on sale on 11 August 2006 for the 2007 model. The facelifted model went on sale in August 2009 for the 2010 model year, which featured the addition of Acura's "power plenum" grille and a front-wheel drive option.

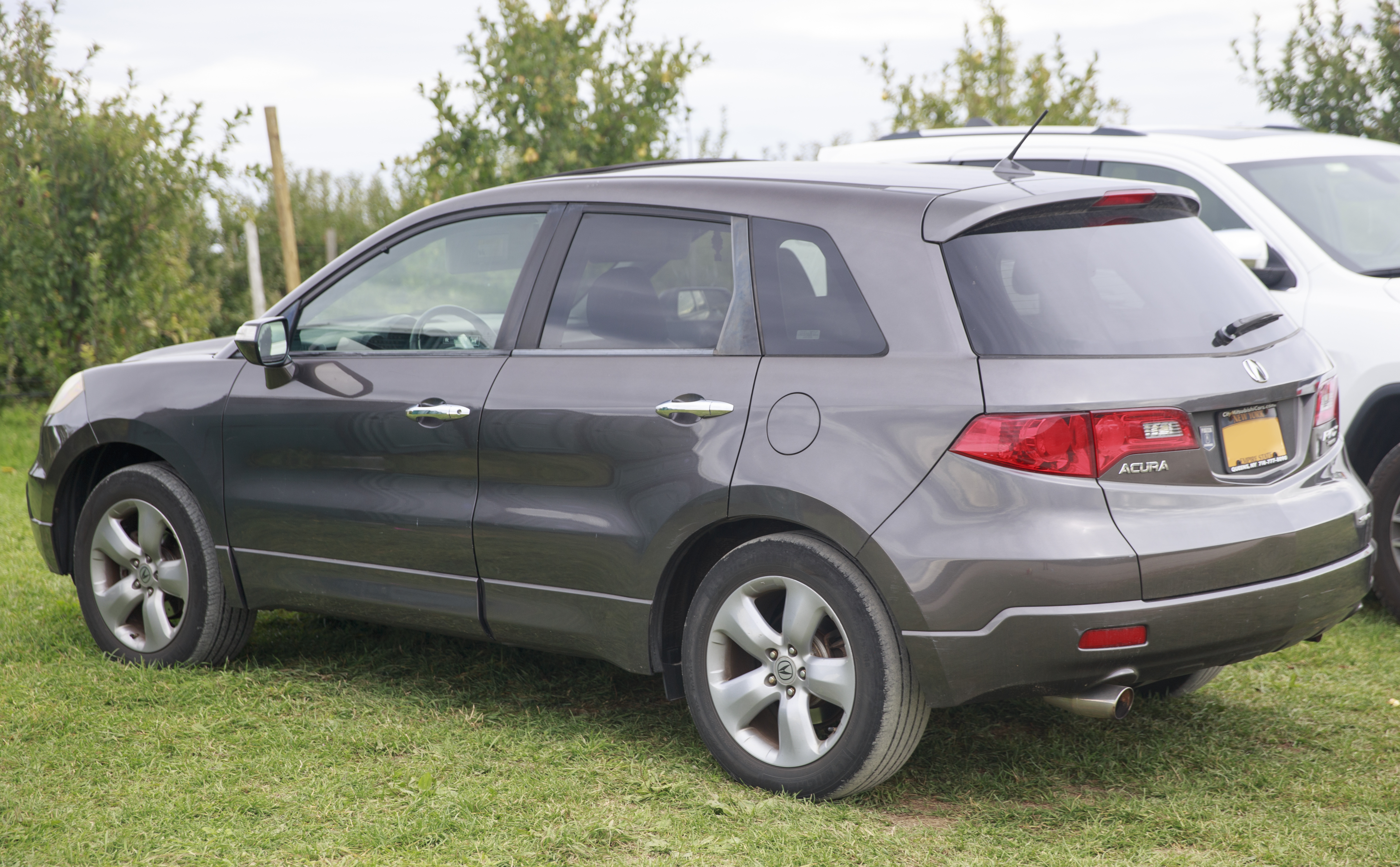
Rear view

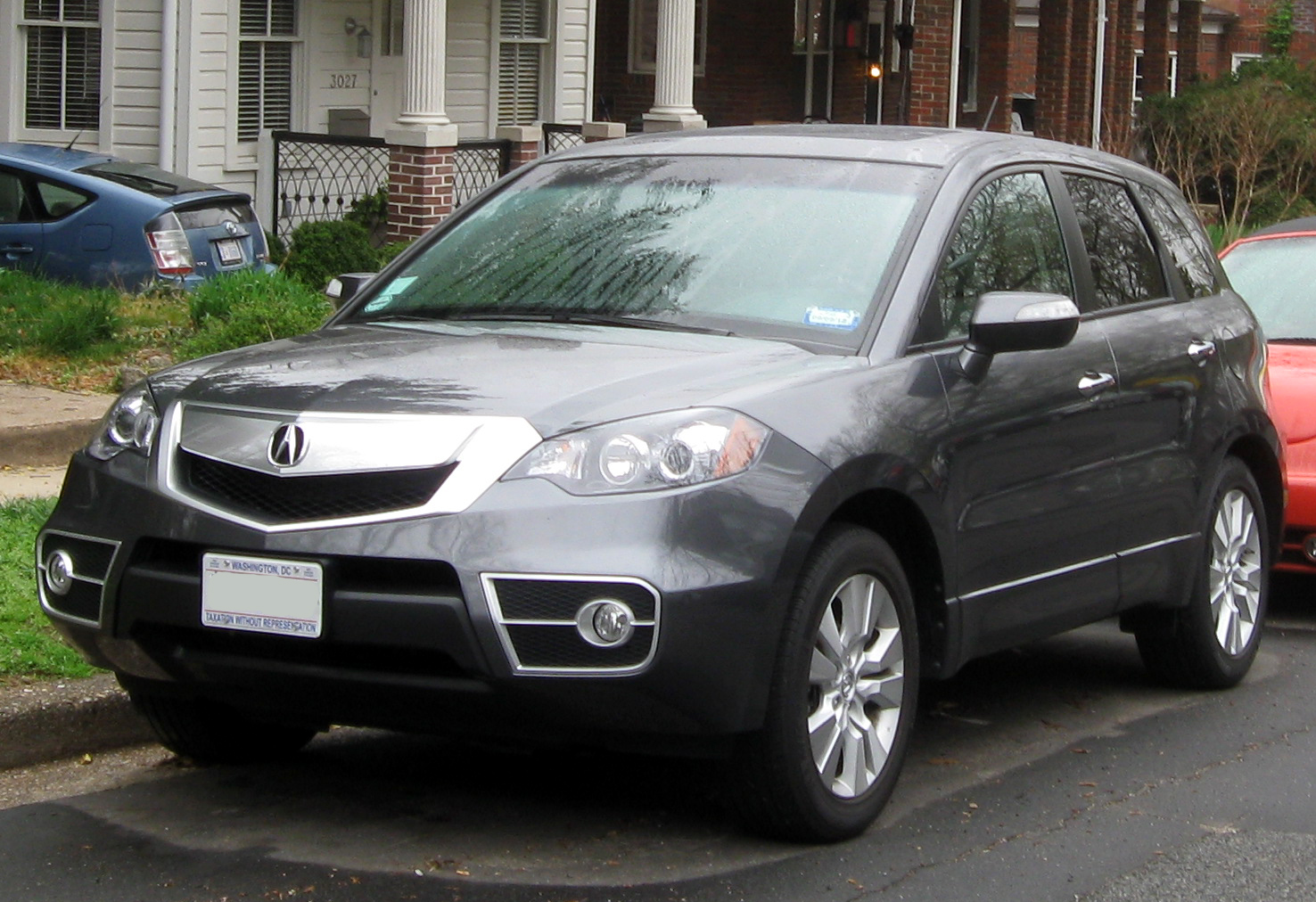
2010 Acura RDX (facelift)

=== Engine ===
The first-generation RDX is powered by a 2.3-liter straight-4 turbocharged gasoline engine, rated at 240 bhp (179 kW; 243 PS) at 6,000 rpm with a torque peak of 260 ft⋅lbf (350 N⋅m) at 4,500 rpm. At the time, this was uncommon among Honda vehicles.

The K23A1 engine has all-aluminum construction, an i-VTEC head, and dual balance shafts. It was also one of the only four-cylinder powered luxury SUVs of its generation. Honda's variable flow turbocharger reduces turbo lag by using a valve to narrow the exhaust passage at low rpm, increasing the velocity of the exhaust flow and keeping the turbine spinning rapidly. At higher rpm, the valve opens to allow more exhaust flow for increased boost. The engine also features a top-mounted intercooler which receives air from the grille, channeled by ducting under the hood.

The U.S. Environmental Protection Agency (EPA) estimated fuel mileage is 19 mpg_{‑US} (12 L/100 km; 23 mpg_{‑imp}) city and 23 mpg_{‑US} (10 L/100 km; 28 mpg_{‑imp}) highway miles per gallon. An updated EPA mileage estimate in February 2007 rated the RDX at 17 mpg_{‑US} (14 L/100 km; 20 mpg_{‑imp}) city and 22 mpg_{‑US} (11 L/100 km; 26 mpg_{‑imp}) highway.

=== Drivetrain ===
The first-generation RDX featured a version of Acura's Super Handling All-Wheel Drive (SH-AWD) and a five-speed automatic transmission with Acura's SportShift sequential shift capability, activated by paddles mounted on the steering wheel for 2007-2009 models (additionally FWD was offered in some trims for 2010-2012 models). The paddles can be used in Drive (D) to make a gear change with the transmission returning to automatic mode as soon as the vehicle resumes a steady-cruise state. The Sport (S) setting has higher shift points and quicker downshifts, and using a paddle in “Sport” immediately puts the transmission in fully-manual mode. The four-cylinder engines in the first-generation RDX all use a timing chain, whereas the V6 installed in subsequent years (2013-2018) all use timing belts.

=== Interior ===
The vehicle's interior includes standard leather seating, a moonroof, automatic climate control, and all the expected power features. The RDX 7-speaker audio system features XM Satellite Radio, along with an in-dash 6-CD changer, which is capable of playing standard Audio CDs, and Data-CDs burned with either MP3 or WMA files, it also plays DVD-A type CDs.

Much of the interior technology originally introduced in the RL sedan was equipped in the optional "Technology Package". This package included Acura's navigation system, a backup camera, XM Nav-Traffic real-time traffic monitoring, and Zagat restaurant reviews. The package also featured a 10-speaker ELS Surround audio system with DTS and Dolby Pro Logic II surround sound. Both stereos included a 1/8" (a 3.5mm) auxiliary input jack used to plug in external sources such as iPods. For 2007, Acura also offered an iPod adapter for the RDX, which was wired into the glove box, and allowed the iPod to be controlled through the RDX's sound system interface. Due to hardware incompatibilities, the Honda/Acura iPod music link was discontinued in 2007 for the 2008 model year. The 2010-12 models featured a USB connection that interfaces with iPods and other USB mass storage devices, such as flash drives that contain MP3, WMA6, or AAC music files while being stored in the center console.

=== Safety ===
The first-generation RDX was the second Acura vehicle to feature the Advanced Compatibility Engineering (ACE) body structure, which is designed to absorb energy from a collision. Standard safety features include six airbags, including dual front airbags, front side airbags, and dual-side curtain airbags. The front airbags use a dual-threshold, dual-stage technology that can adjust the timing and speed of each airbag deployment depending on the degree of impact and the driver's or front passenger's seat belt usage. If sensors deem the front passenger is too small (less than 65 lb (29 kg)), the front airbag is designed not to deploy. The front passenger's side airbag is also designed to shut off if a child or small-statured adult is leaning into the airbag's deployment path. In the event of a sufficient side impact or roll-over, the side curtain airbag deploys from above the door frames of the affected side, with coverage for both the front and rear occupants on that side, and stays inflated longer than if there were a collision.

Front seats feature active head restraints and their seat belts are equipped with pre-tensioners and force limiters. In November 2006, the RDX was crash-tested by the U.S. National Highway Traffic Safety Administration, resulting in a perfect "5 Star" rating for driver and passenger frontal crashes, and front and rear side impacts, along with "4 Stars" for rollover.

The Insurance Institute for Highway Safety, Highway Loss Data Institute (IIHS-HLDI) gave the 2007-12 RDX the grade of Good "G" for moderate overlap front test and side impact test. The grade of Marginal "M" was given for roof strength evaluation.

== Second generation (TB3/4; 2013) ==
Second generation
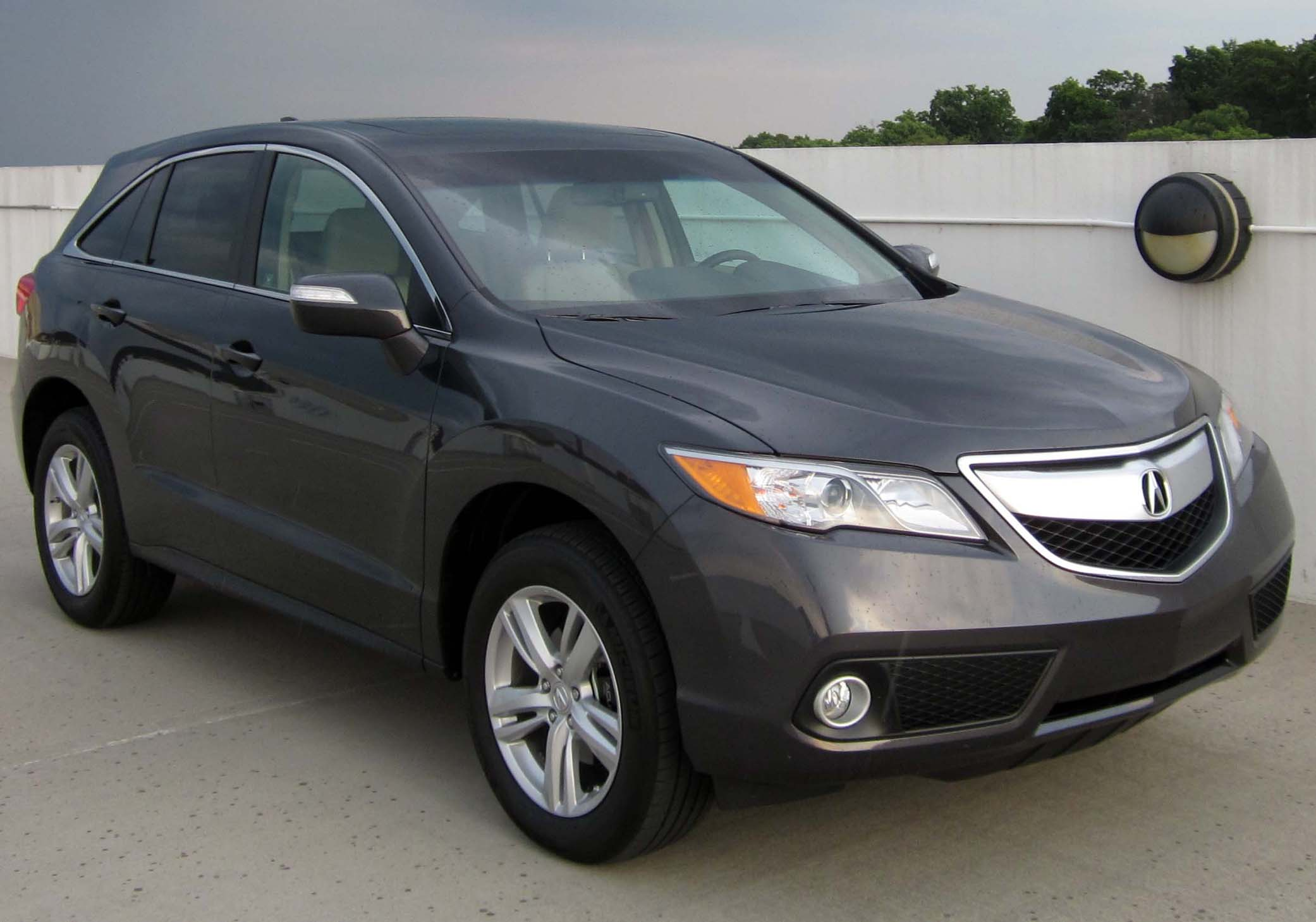
- 2013 Acura RDX

Overview
- Model code: TB3/4
- Production: March 2012–2018
- Model years: 2013–2018
- Assembly: United States: East Liberty, Ohio (East Liberty Auto Plant)
- Designer: Toshinobu Minami (2010)

Body and chassis
- Layout: Front engine, front-wheel drive, all-wheel drive
- Platform: Honda C-5
- Related: Honda Civic (ninth generation); Honda CR-V (fourth generation)

Powertrain
- Engine: 3.0 L J30Y1 V6 (China Only); 3.5 L J35Z2 V6
- Transmission: 6-speed automatic

Dimensions
- Wheelbase: 105.7 in (2,685 mm)
- Length: 183.7 in (4,666 mm)
- Width: 73 in (1,854 mm)
- Height: 64.2 in (1,631 mm)
- Curb weight: 3,717 lb (1,686 kg) (FWD); 3,838 lb (1,741 kg) (AWD)

The second generation RDX was revealed during January 2012 at the North American International Auto Show and went on sale in April 2012 for the 2013 model year. The turbocharged four-cylinder gasoline engine was replaced by a 3.5-liter V6 gasoline engine mated to a six-speed automatic, improving gas mileage to an EPA estimate of 20 mpg_{‑US} (12 L/100 km; 24 mpg_{‑imp}) city, 28 mpg_{‑US} (8.4 L/100 km; 34 mpg_{‑imp}) highway, and 23 mpg_{‑US} (10 L/100 km; 28 mpg_{‑imp}) combined, by using variable displacement (VCM). The SH-AWD system was replaced with a simpler and less costly AWD setup.

A 5-inch display, tri-angle rear-view backup camera are standard, as well as keyless entry with push-button start. Also, standard Bluetooth hands-free calling and Pandora music can be streamed wirelessly into the audio system. When upgrading to the Technology package, a power tailgate is included, along with an upgraded 60-gigabyte hard disc (HDD) based navigation system with 8-inch screen, this system enables 15GB of music to be stored.

In China, the RDX is offered with two engines. A 3.0-liter SOHC V6 gasoline produces 263 hp (196 kW; 267 PS) at 6700 rpm and 220 lb⋅ft (298 N⋅m) of torque at 4600 rpm, while the 3.5-liter SOHC V6 gasoline produces 273 hp (204 kW; 277 PS) at 6500 rpm and 254 lb⋅ft (344 N⋅m) at 4400 rpm. Both engine choices come with either front-wheel or all-wheel drive.

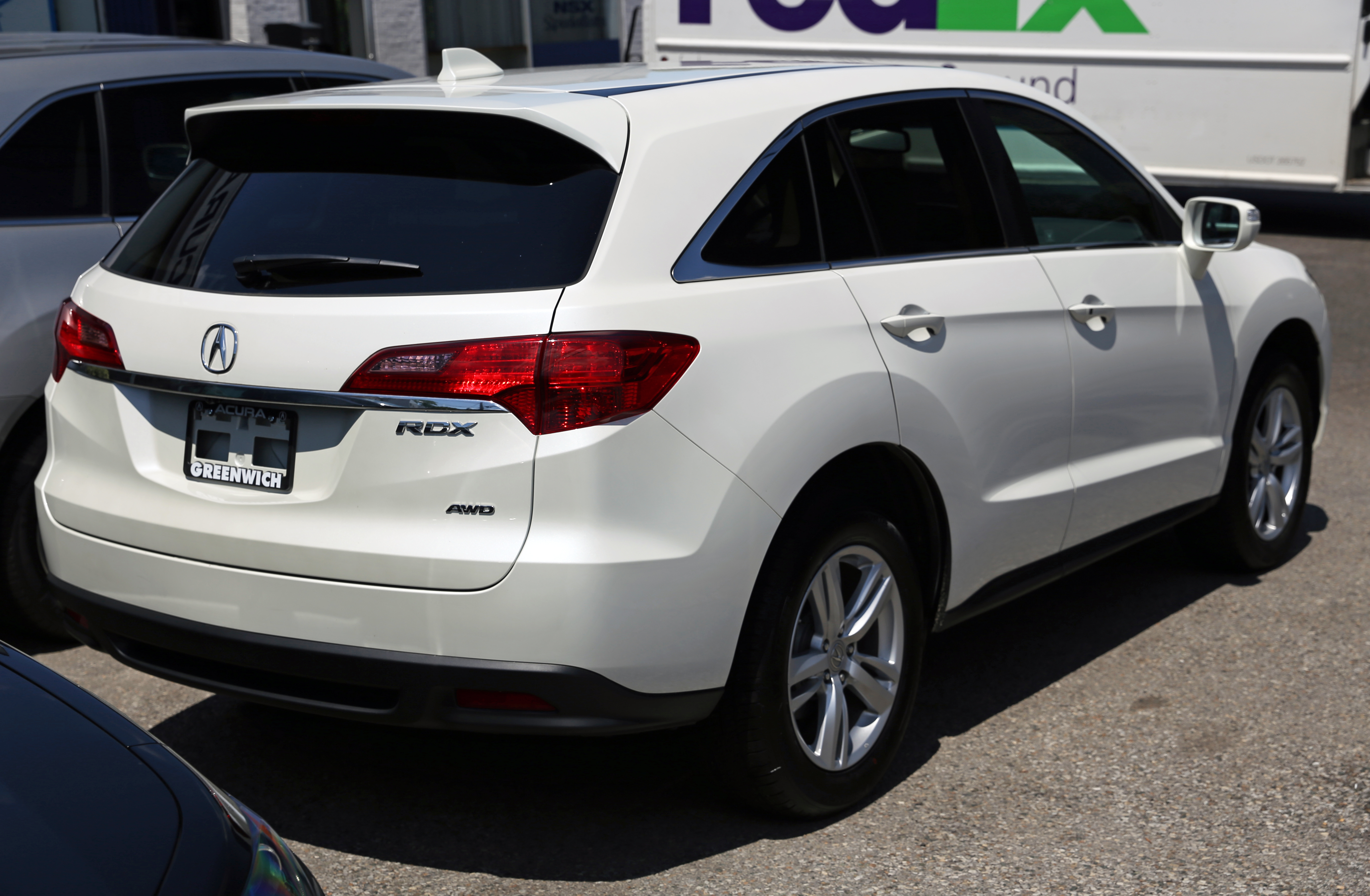
Rear view

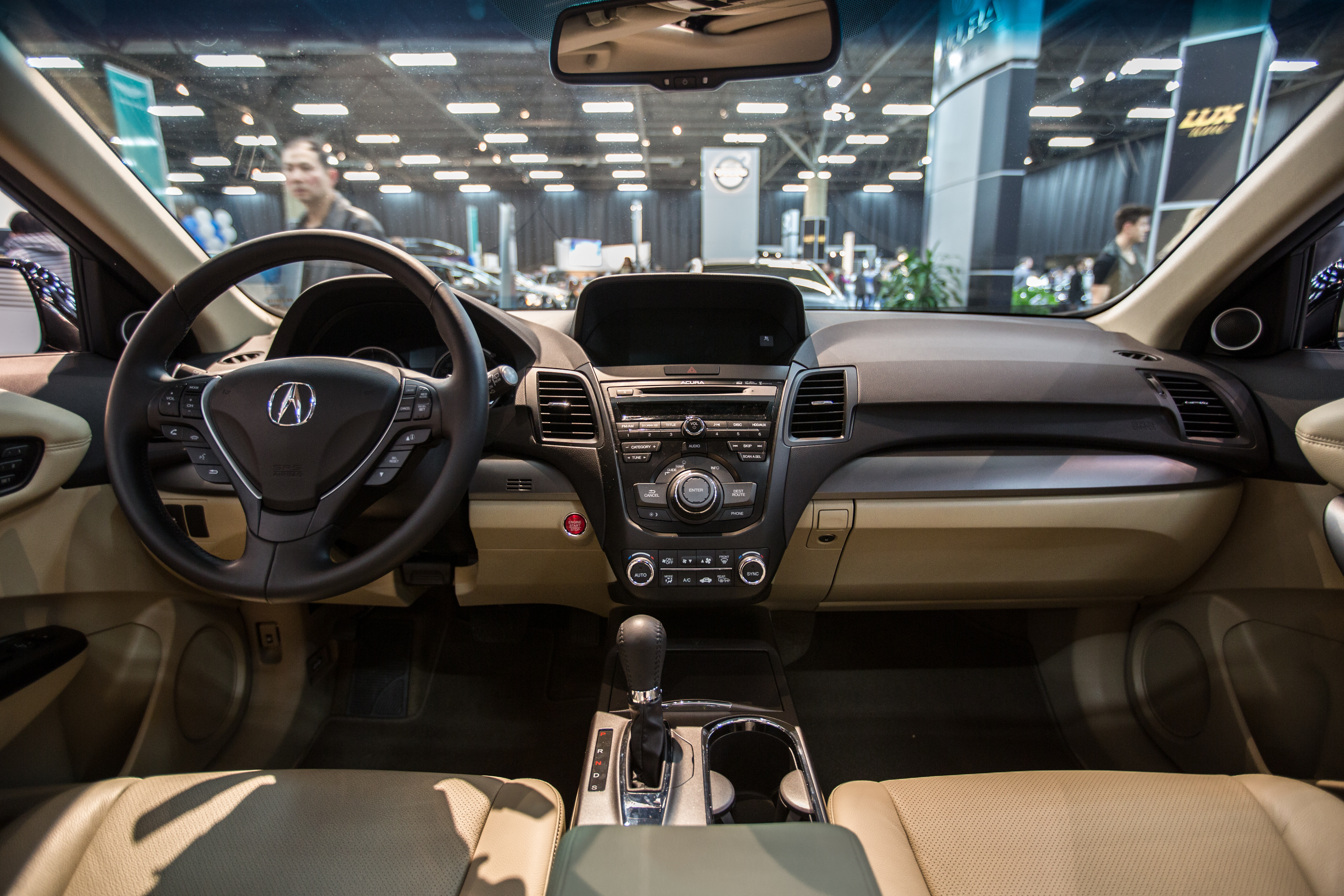
Interior

=== 2016 facelift ===
The refreshed 2016 RDX was introduced at the 2015 Chicago Auto Show; sales began in mid-April 2015. The updated RDX uses a slightly more powerful revised 3.5-liter SOHC V6 that produces 279 horsepower (208 kW) and 252 lb⋅ft (342 N⋅m) of torque. The exterior adds LED headlamps (low and high beams, DRL pipe and amber turn signals) and LED taillamps. Additionally, the 2016 RDX includes several driver assists in the AcuraWatch package including Adaptive Cruise Control and Lane Keeping Assist System (LKAS). AWD was also updated to send up to 50% torque to rear wheels (on wet surfaces) opposed to up to 25% in the previous model.

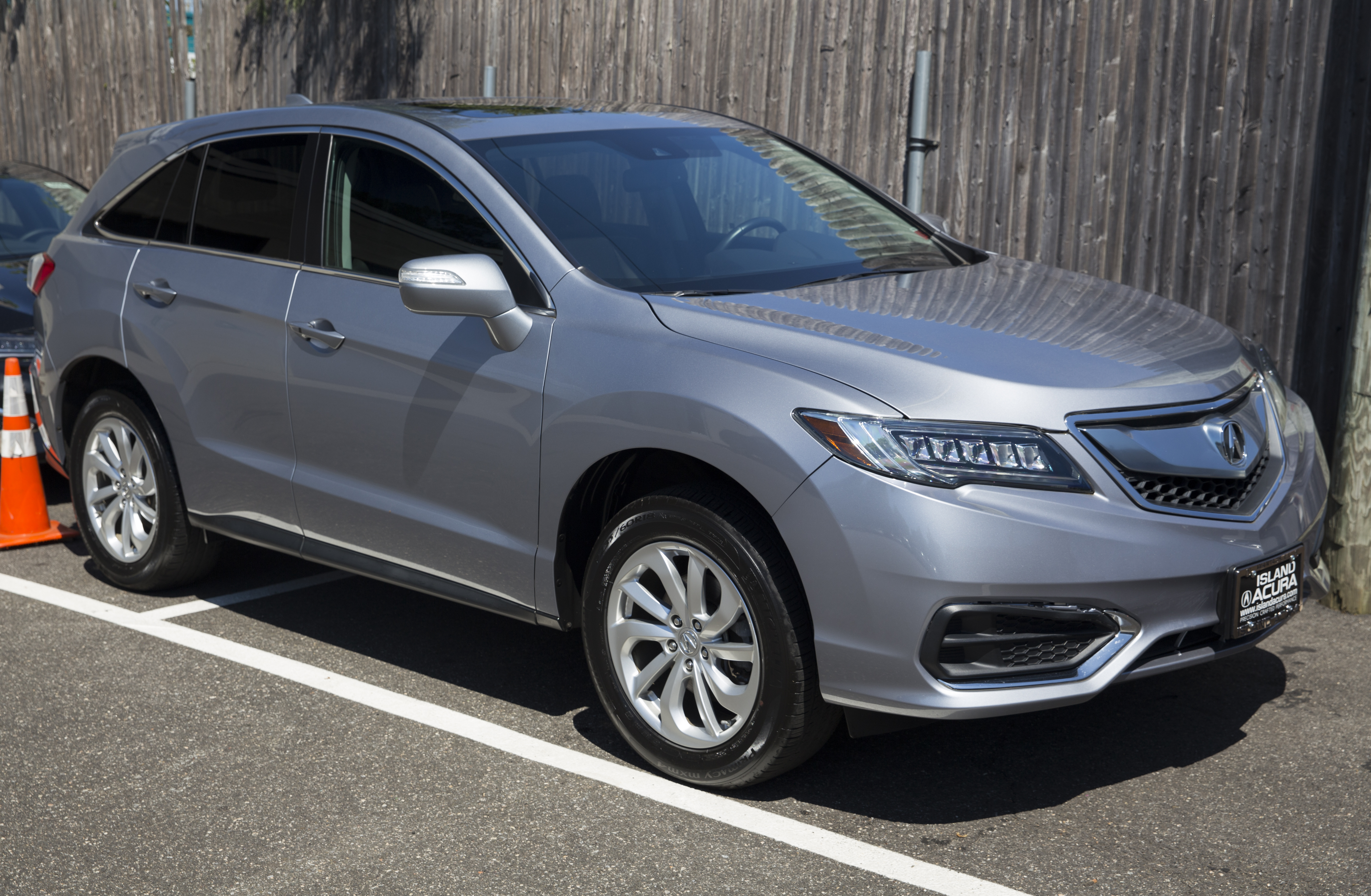
2016 Acura RDX (US, facelift)

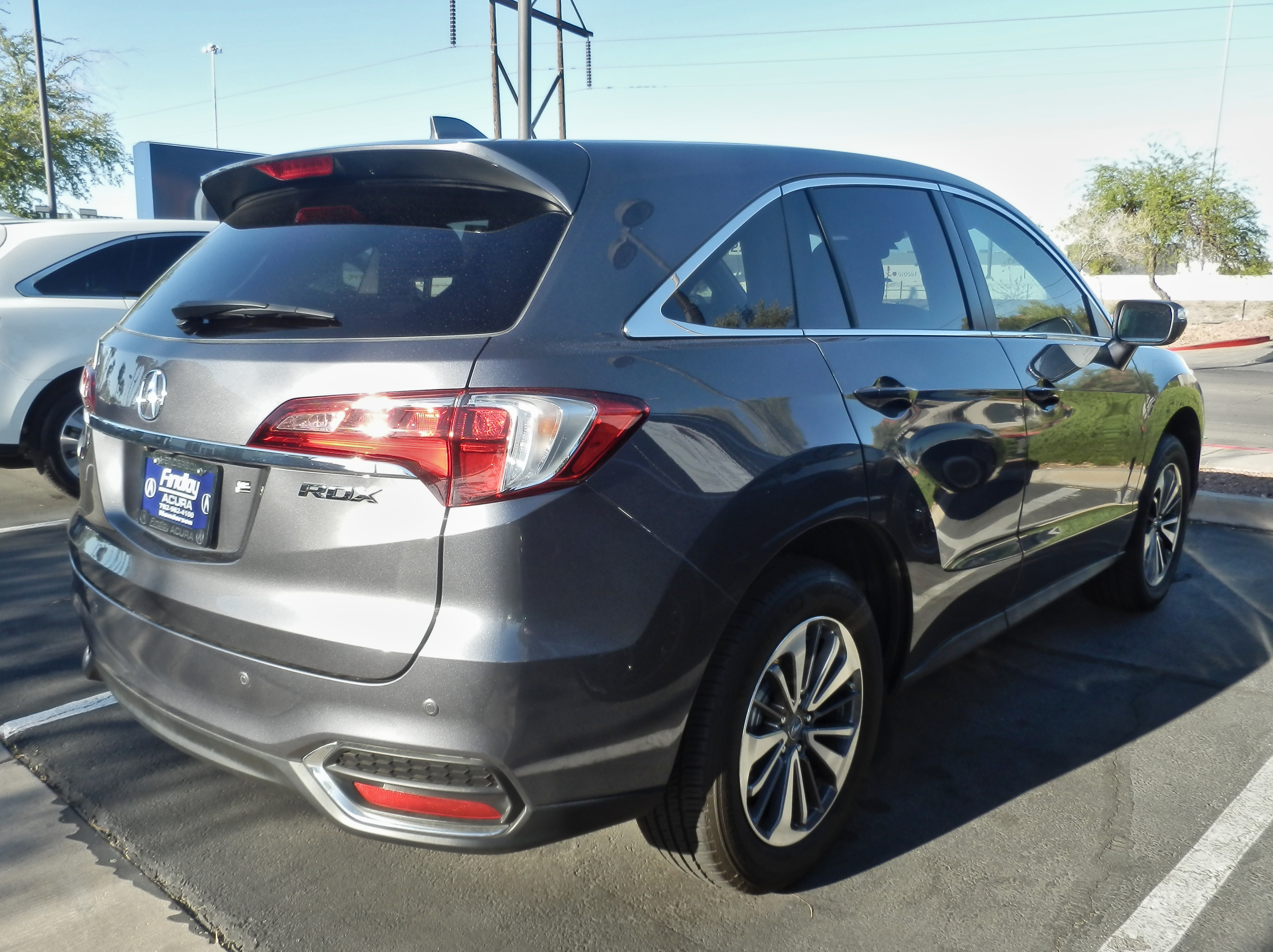
Rear view (US, facelift)

=== Marketing ===
Acura and Marvel Entertainment, LLC, announced a joint promotional campaign with Marvel's The Avengers movie. Throughout Marvel's The Avengers, S.H.I.E.L.D. agents drive various Acura vehicles, including the MDX, ZDX, and TL models; the completely redesigned 2013 RDX was to make a cameo appearance in the movie but the scene did not make it in the final cut. However, the Acura NSX concept convertible sports car made an appearance in the movie.

=== Safety ===
NHTSA 2014 RDX:
Overall:	5/5 stars
Frontal Driver:	5/5 stars
Frontal Passenger:	5/5 stars
Side Driver:	5/5 stars
Side Passenger:	5/5 stars
Side Pole Driver:	5/5 stars
Rollover FWD:	/ 16.4%
Rollover AWD:	/ 15.5%

IIHS scores:
Moderate overlap frontal offset	Good
Small overlap frontal offset (2013–15)	not tested
Small overlap frontal offset (2016–present)	Good^{1}
Side impact	Good
Roof strength	Good^{2}

^{1} vehicle structure rated "Good"
^{2} strength-to-weight ratio: 5.48

== Third generation (TC1/2; 2019) ==
Third generation
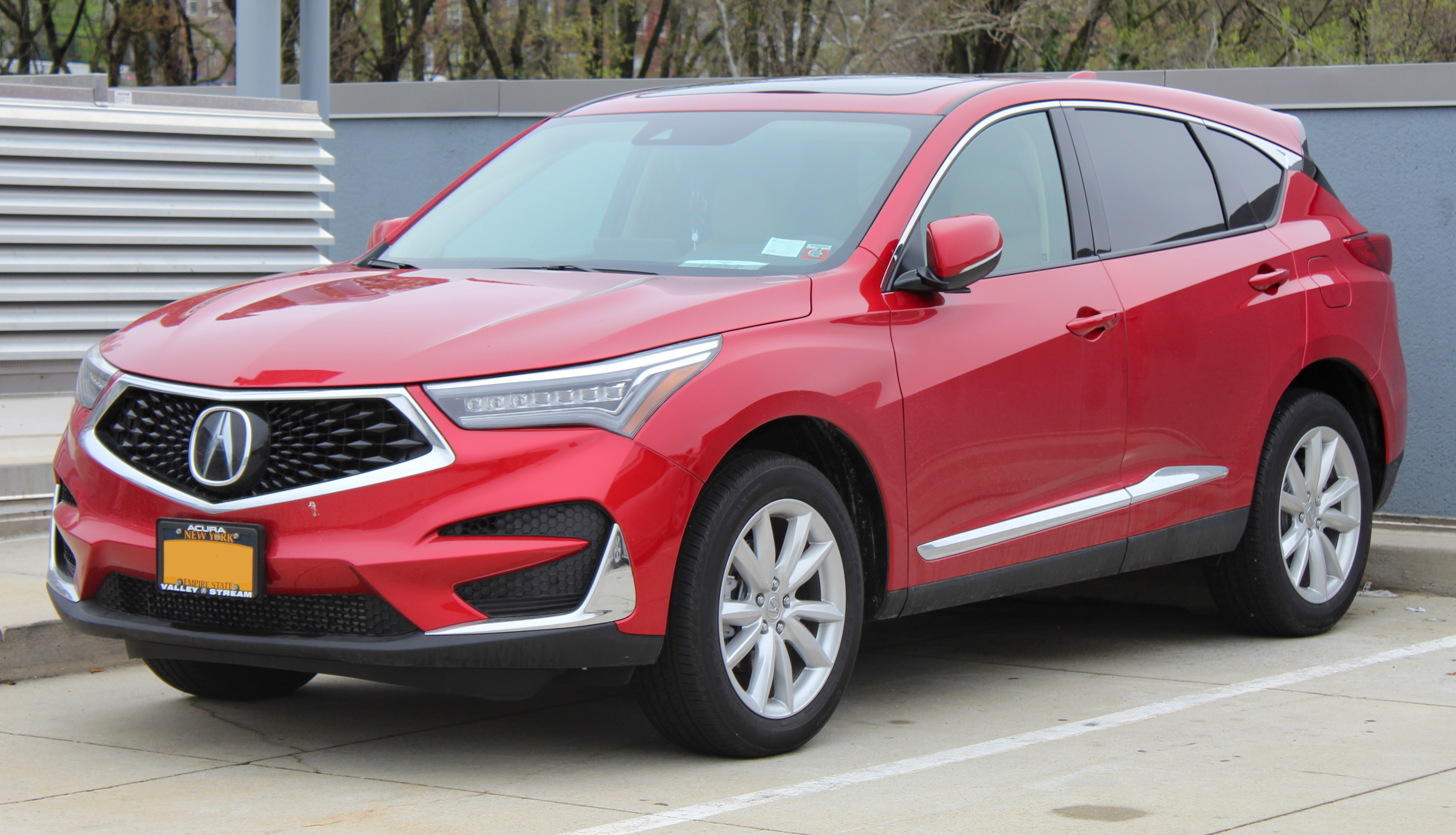
- 2019 Acura RDX

Overview
- Model code: TC1/2
- Production: May 2018 – May 05, 2026
- Model years: 2019–2026
- Assembly: United States: East Liberty, Ohio (East Liberty Auto Plant); Marysville, Ohio (Marysville Auto Plant, 2021-2022 PMC Edition); China: Guangzhou (GAC Honda, 2018-2022)
- Designer: Randall Smock

Body and chassis
- Layout: Front engine, front-wheel drive / all-wheel drive (SH-AWD)
- Platform: Honda Architecture (HA)

Powertrain
- Engine: 2.0 L K20C4 (turbo)
- Transmission: 10-speed automatic

Dimensions
- Wheelbase: 108.3 in (2,751 mm)
- Length: 186.7 in (4,742 mm)
- Width: 74.8 in (1,900 mm)
- Height: 65.7 in (1,669 mm)
- Curb weight: 3,783–3,829 lb (1,716–1,737 kg)(FWD); 4,019–4,068 lb (1,823–1,845 kg)(AWD)

Acura debuted the 2019 RDX Prototype, on January 15, 2018, at the North American International Auto Show. Production of the RDX began in May 2018 at East Liberty, Ohio. The third-generation RDX arrived at dealerships across North America on June 1, 2018 for the 2019 model year.

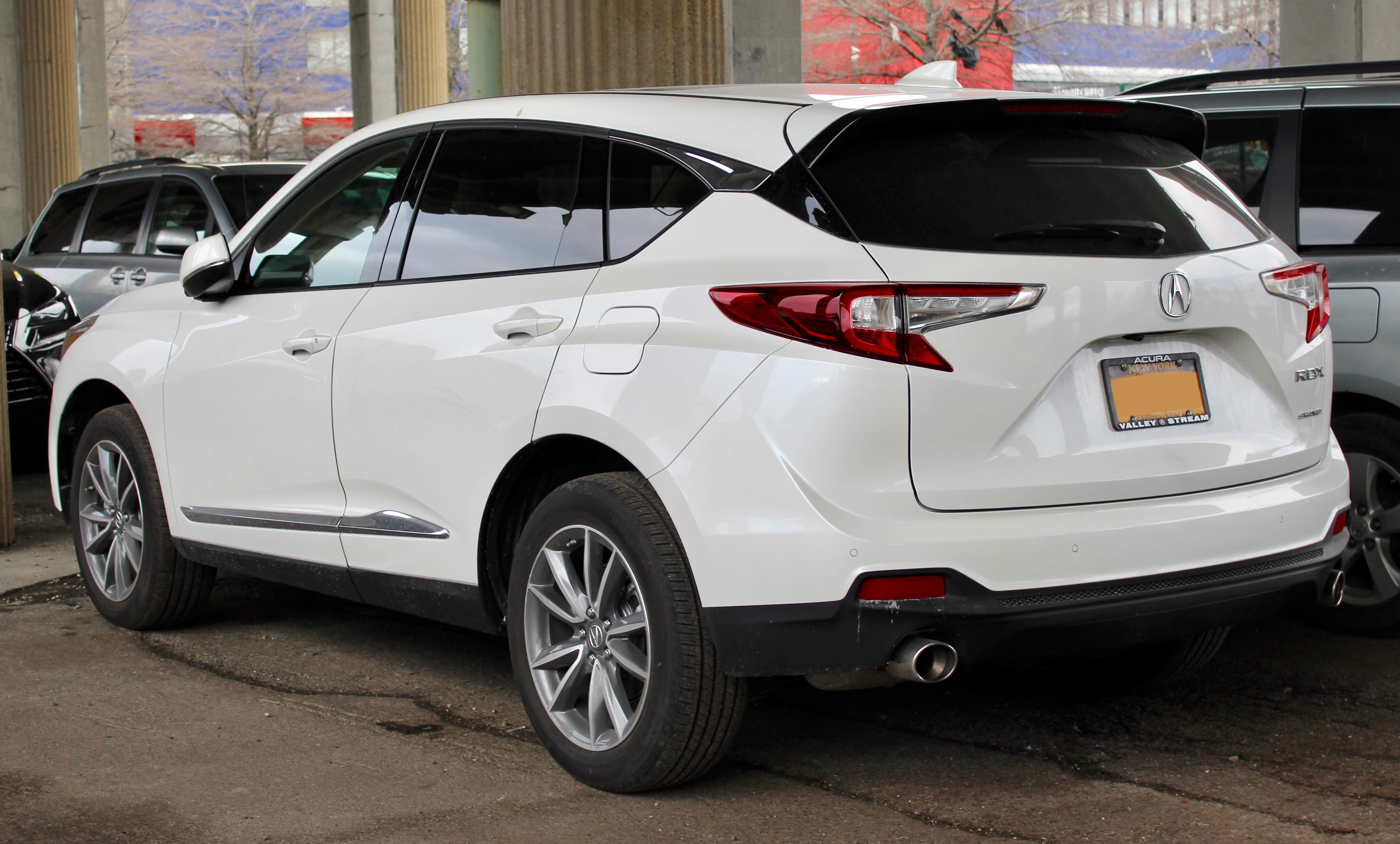
Rear view

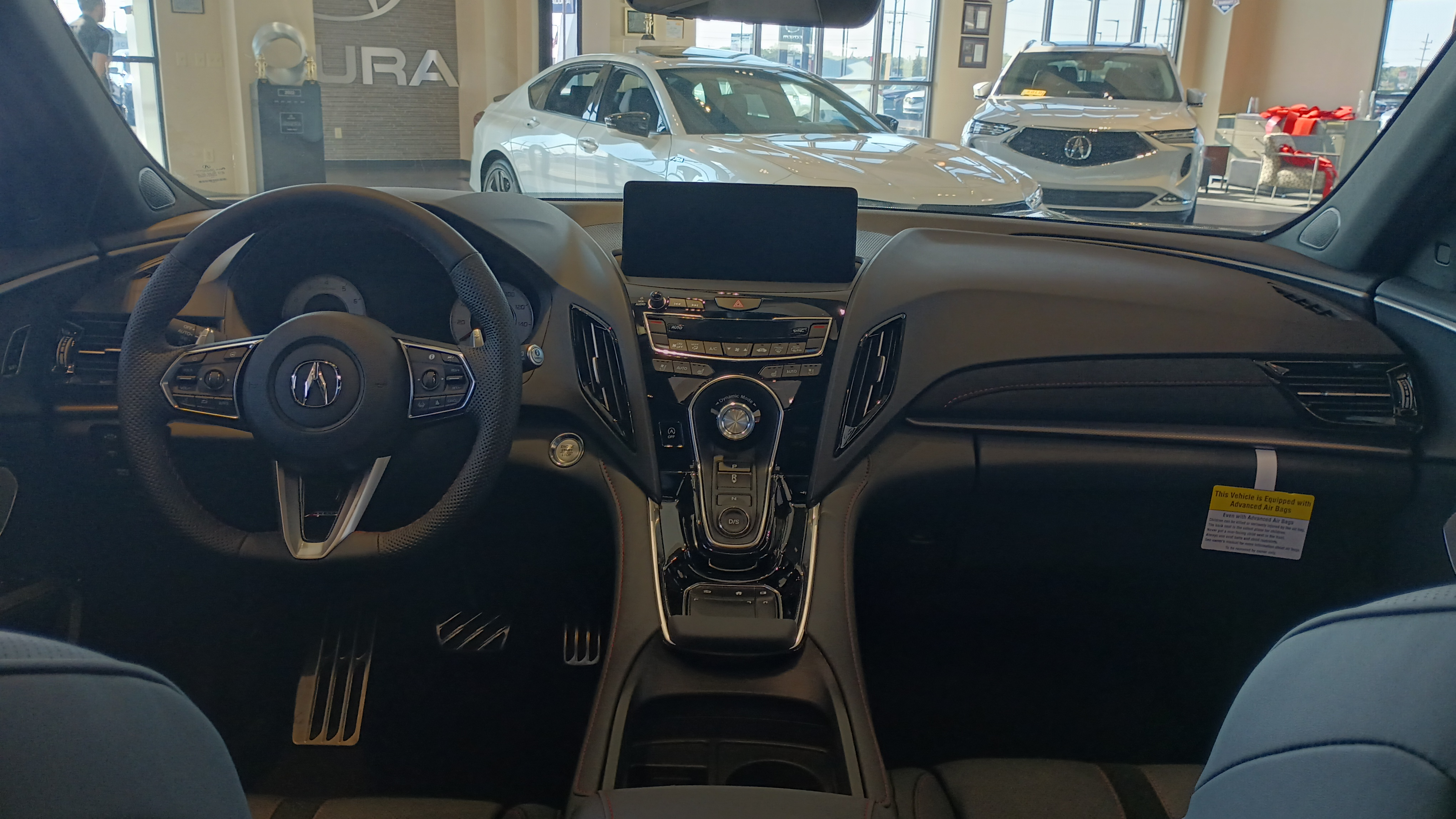
Interior

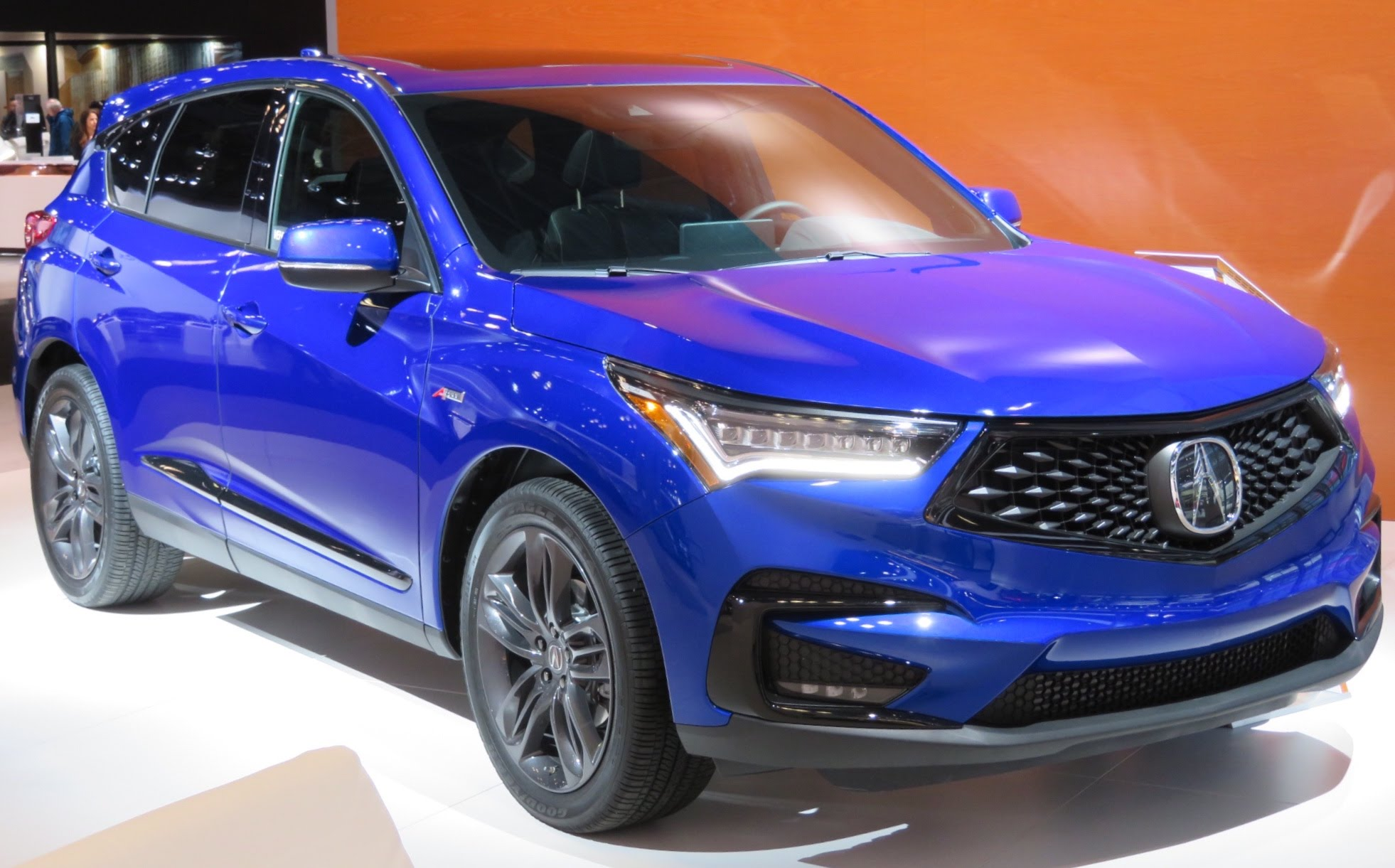
Acura RDX A-Spec

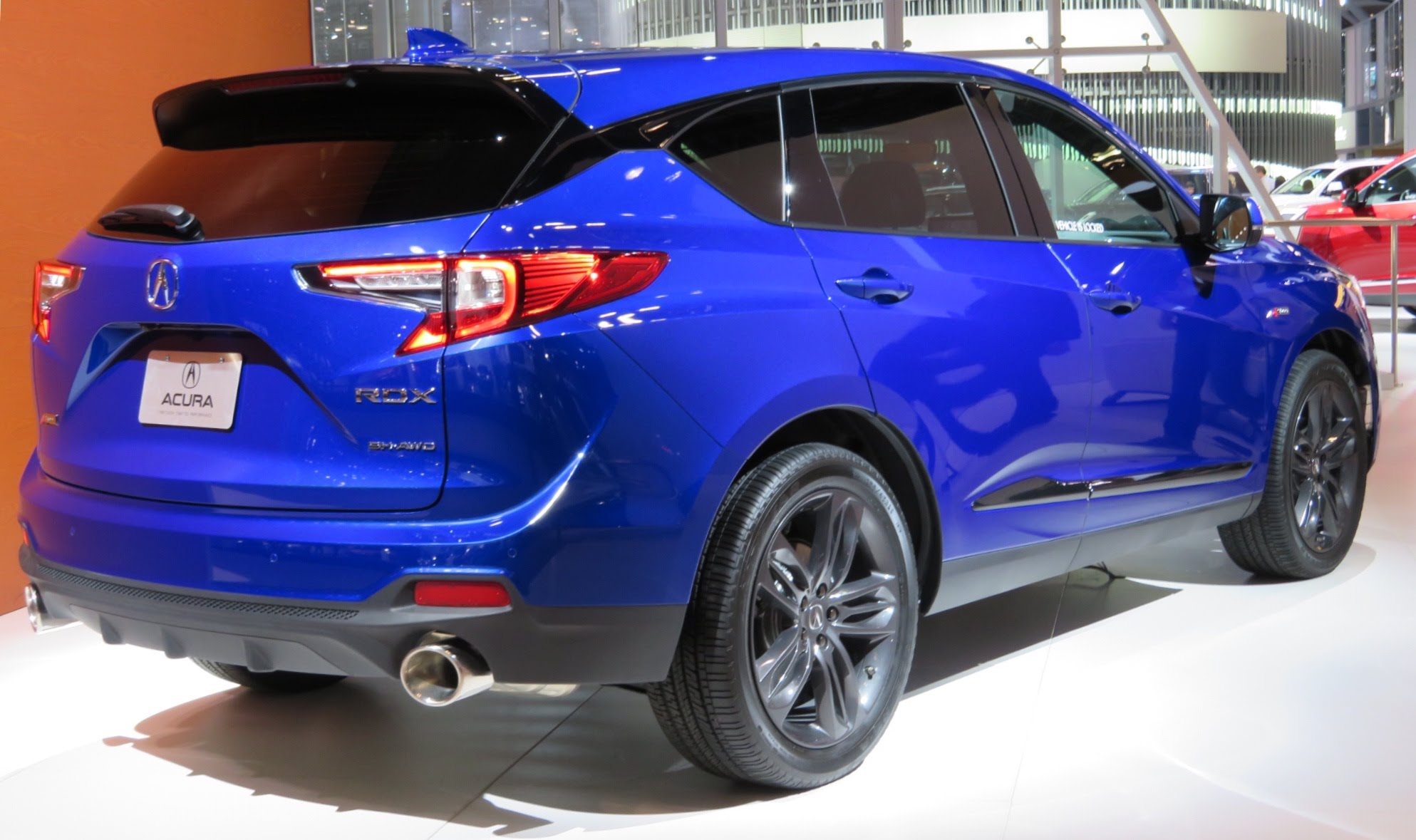
Rear view (A-Spec; pre-facelift)

=== Equipment ===
An A-Spec trim was offered which added aggressive body modifications, metal paddle shifters, larger wheels, and optional red leather interior with black alcantara inserts. This was the first Acura car to feature the company's True Touch Pad Interface infotainment system which features a 10.2 inch widescreen HD display. It is operated by a touchpad which operates differently from a traditional touchpad (like the one found on a laptop). The touchpad uses absolute positioning, which would mean that the finger placement corresponds with the position of the screen.

New features include Active Damper system, 360-degree surround-view exterior cameras, panoramic glass moonroof, acoustic front door glass, head-up display 4-way power lumbar front seats, and 16-way power front seats. In 2020, for the 2021 model year, Acura included a new limited-edition trim level, called the PMC Edition.

=== Engine ===
The 2019 RDX is powered by a direct-injected turbo 2.0-liter gasoline engine used in the Honda Accord, producing 272 hp (203 kW; 276 PS) and 280 lb⋅ft (380 N⋅m) of torque. The front-wheel-drive 2019 RDX received an EPA fuel economy rating of 22 mpg_{‑US} (11 L/100 km; 26 mpg_{‑imp}) city/28 mpg_{‑US} (8.4 L/100 km; 34 mpg_{‑imp}) highway/24 mpg_{‑US} (9.8 L/100 km; 29 mpg_{‑imp}) combined mpg; the SH-AWD model, a 21 mpg_{‑US} (11 L/100 km; 25 mpg_{‑imp}) city/27 mpg_{‑US} (8.7 L/100 km; 32 mpg_{‑imp}) highway/23 mpg_{‑US} (10 L/100 km; 28 mpg_{‑imp}) combined rating.

=== Transmission ===
The 2019 Acura RDX is equipped with a 10-speed automatic transmission with steering wheel-mounted paddle shifters. According to Honda, this allows the RDX to take the turbocharged engine to its maximum capabilities during low-end torque.

SH-AWD

The 2019 Acura RDX can be equipped with Acura's SH-AWD system, a full-time torque-vectoring system. The AWD system can send 70% of the power to the rear wheels as necessary and once it has arrived it can further be directed to a either rear wheel depending on the requirements. As of the 2024 model year, SH-AWD is standard on all RDX trims, with FWD being dropped as an option.

=== Safety ===
The 2019/2020 RDX has been given an overall "G" or good rating by the Insurance Institute for Highway Safety (IIHS) Highway Loss Data. It was rated an IIHS Top Safety Pick+ in all trims except the Advance for 2019.

IIHS scores (2019 model year)
Small overlap front (driver)	Good	
Small overlap front (passenger)	Good	
Moderate overlap front (original test)	Good	
Side (original test)	Good	
Side (updated test)	Good	
Roof strength	Good	
Head restraints and seats	Good	
Headlights (varies by trim/option)	Good	Acceptable
Front crash prevention: vehicle-to-vehicle	Superior	
Front crash prevention: vehicle-to-pedestrian (Day)	Advanced	
Child seat anchors (LATCH) ease of use	Good+	

=== 2022 facelift ===
In September 2021, the RDX received a facelift for the 2022 model year. Changes include new front and rear fascias, new exterior colors, new alloy wheel designs, interior receives increased sound insulation materials, and new interior features such as wireless Apple CarPlay and Android Auto. There was a limited-production (200 units) RDX PMC edition available for the 2022 model year.

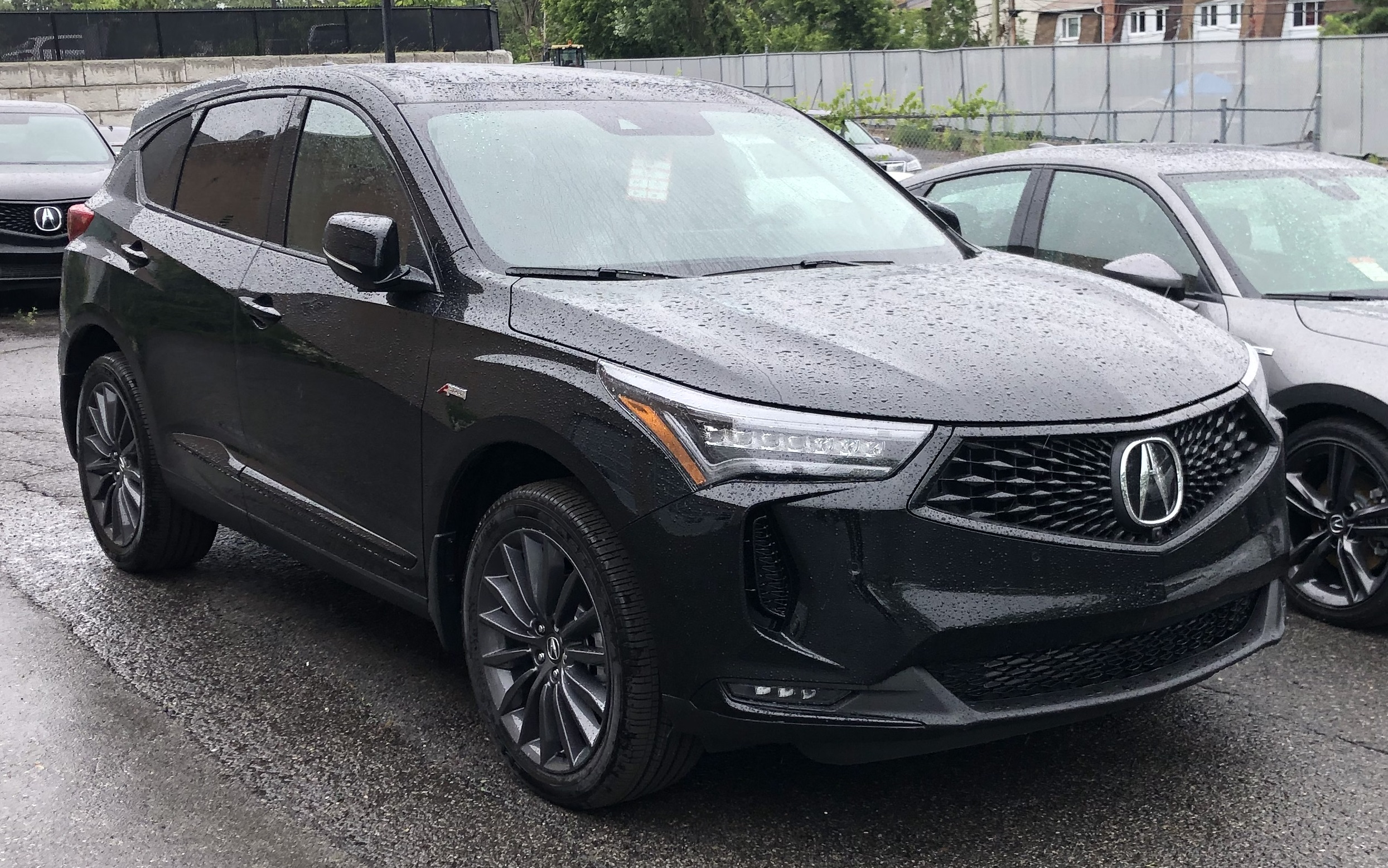
2022 Acura RDX (US, facelift)

=== Pause in production ===
On May 5th, 2026, the last third generation RDX was confirmed to have been built at the Honda East Liberty plant.

== Fourth generation ==
In January 2026, Acura confirmed the fourth generation RDX would arrive "in the next couple of years" and will feature a hybrid powertrain. The fourth generation RDX is expected to be introduced in late 2027 for the 2028 model year.

== Sales ==
Calendar year	US	Canada	China
2006	9,164	1,415	
2007	23,356	4,104	
2008	15,845	3,573	
2009	10,153	2,869	
2010	14,975	3,163	
2011	15,196	3,070	
2012	29,520	4,726	
2013	44,750	6,112	
2014	44,865	6,557	
2015	51,026	7,380	
2016	52,361	8,047	
2017	51,295	8,101	
2018	63,580	8,890	553
2019	62,876	9,716	6,955
2020	52,785	7,563	5,805
2021	57,013	7,976	2,952
2022	24,749	4,786	1,185
2023	39,228	6,090	
2024	42,988		
2025	31,627		

== Motorsport ==
In June 2018, a one-off RDX made a race at Pike's Peak in Colorado a modified 2.0-liter turbo engine equipped with a 48-volt mild hybrid system and an electric supercharger, producing 350-horsepower (261 kW; 355 PS) engine. Other upgrades include 19-inch HRE race wheels wrapped in Pirelli racing tires, Brembo front brake calipers and racing pads, and a race-tuned suspension. Acura stripped out the interior to reduce weight and improve handling.
