= Honda 0 Saloon =

Japanese concept car

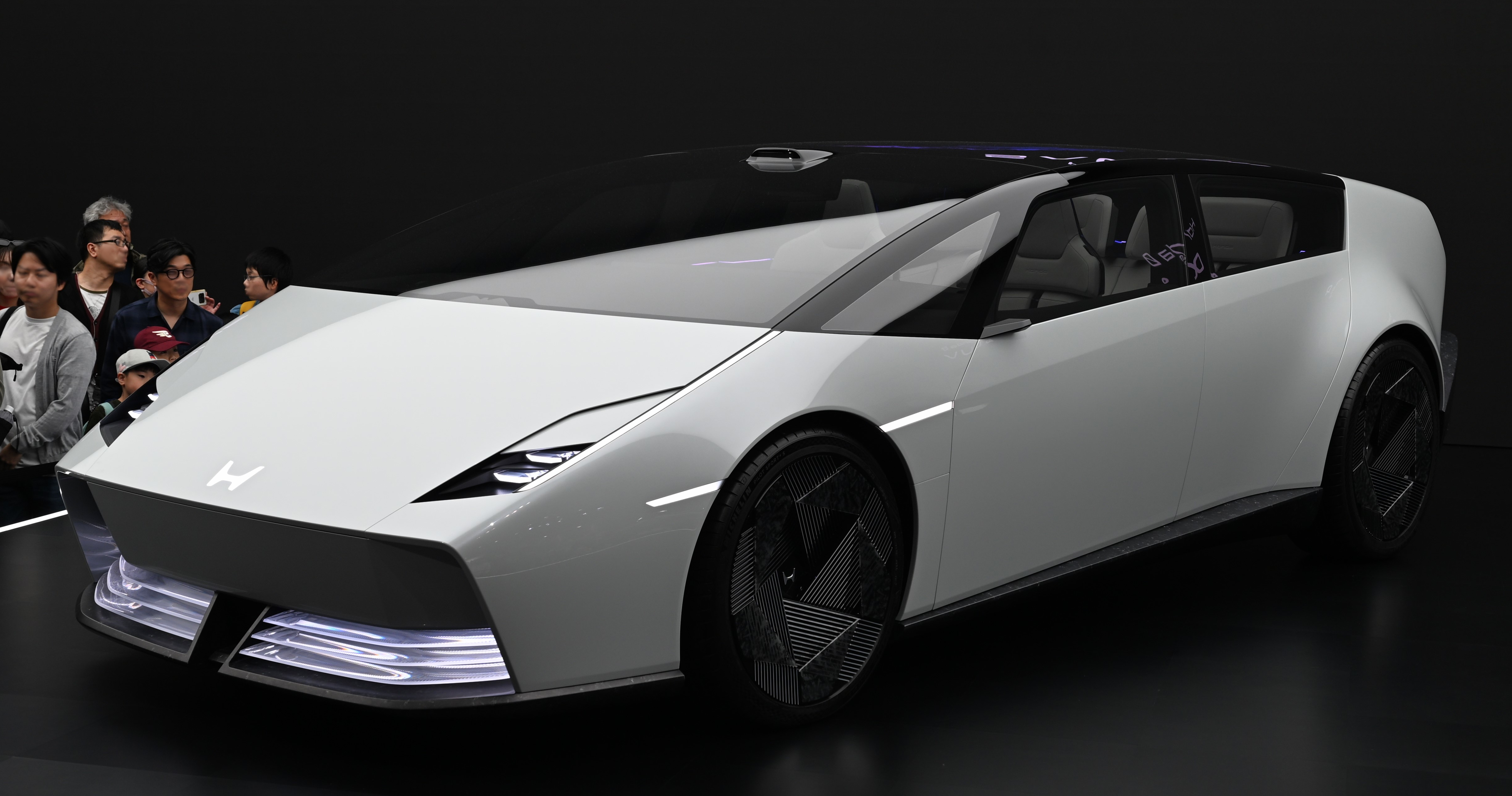

Overview
- Manufacturer: Honda
- Production: Cancelled
- Assembly: United States: Marysville, Ohio (Marysville Auto Plant)

Body and chassis
- Body style: 4-door sedan
- Platform: Zero platform
- Related: Honda 0 SUV; Acura RSX

Powertrain
- Engine: Electric Motor

The Honda 0 Saloon was a planned electric vehicle developed by Honda, introduced as part of the Honda 0 Series at the 2025 Consumer Electronics Show. It was expected to enter production in 2026, initially launching in North America, followed by other global markets. In March 2026, Honda cancelled the 0 Saloon, citing US tariffs, cancellation of EV subsidies and competitive pressures which would make launching the vehicle unprofitable.

== Design ==
The vehicle follows a design approach that prioritizes aerodynamics, lightweight construction, and integrated technology. It has a low and wide body and a minimalist interior with a focus on space and functionality.

== Features ==
The 0 Series Saloon includes an artificial intelligence system that adapts to driver preferences, driver-assistance features capable of limited autonomous operation, and software that can be updated remotely. The battery system is designed for fast charging and an extended driving range.

== Production ==
Honda planned to manufacture the 0 Saloon as part of its broader electrification strategy, aiming to transition to 100% electric sales by 2040. The vehicle was expected to compete with premium electric sedans from companies like Tesla, BMW, and Mercedes-Benz.

Production was slated to begin in 2026 in Ohio, with an initial launch in North America, followed by expansions into Japan, Europe, and other global markets.

In March 2026, Honda cancelled the 0 Saloon, along with the Acura RSX and 0 SUV due to "the unfavorable impact of changes in U.S. tariff policies" and competitive pressures leading to Honda being "unable to deliver products that offer value for money better than that of newer EV manufacturers"..

== Gallery ==
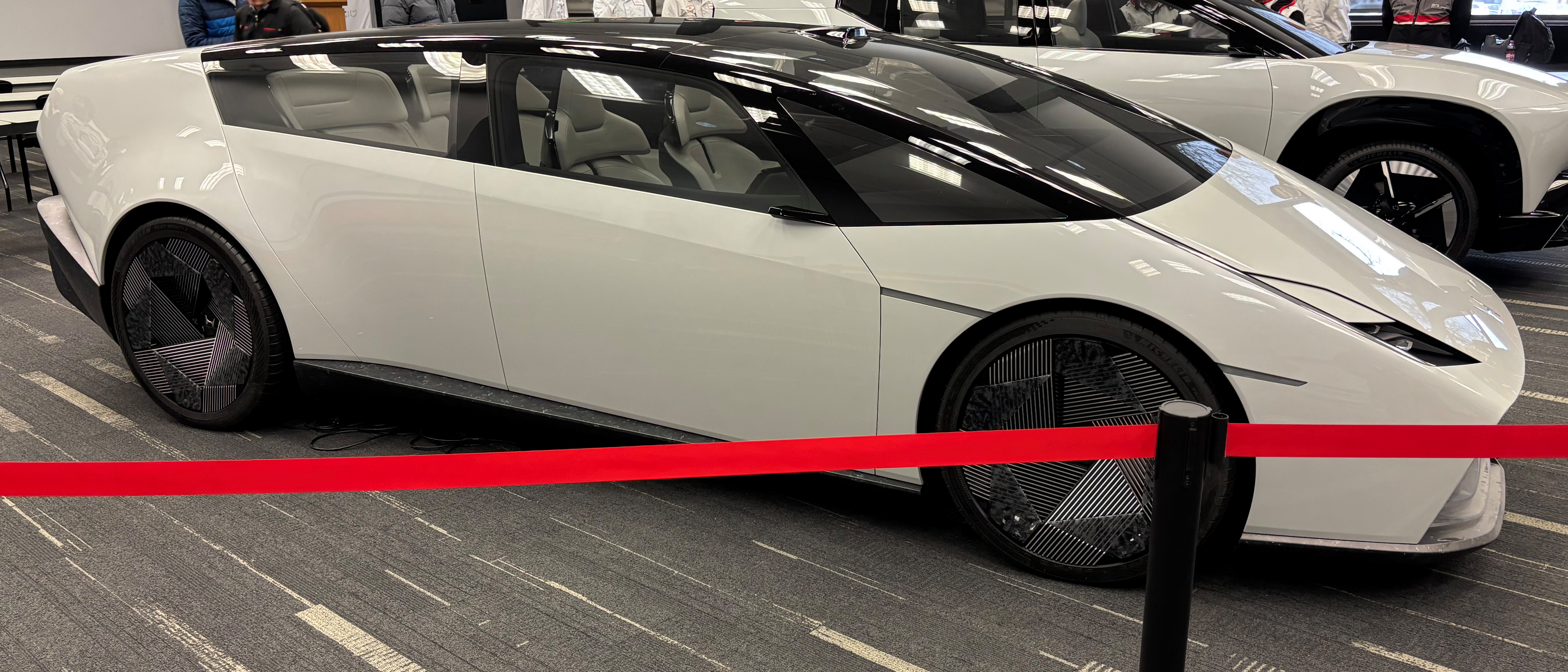
Honda 0 Series Saloon at Honda Marysville Auto Plant (Marysville, Ohio)

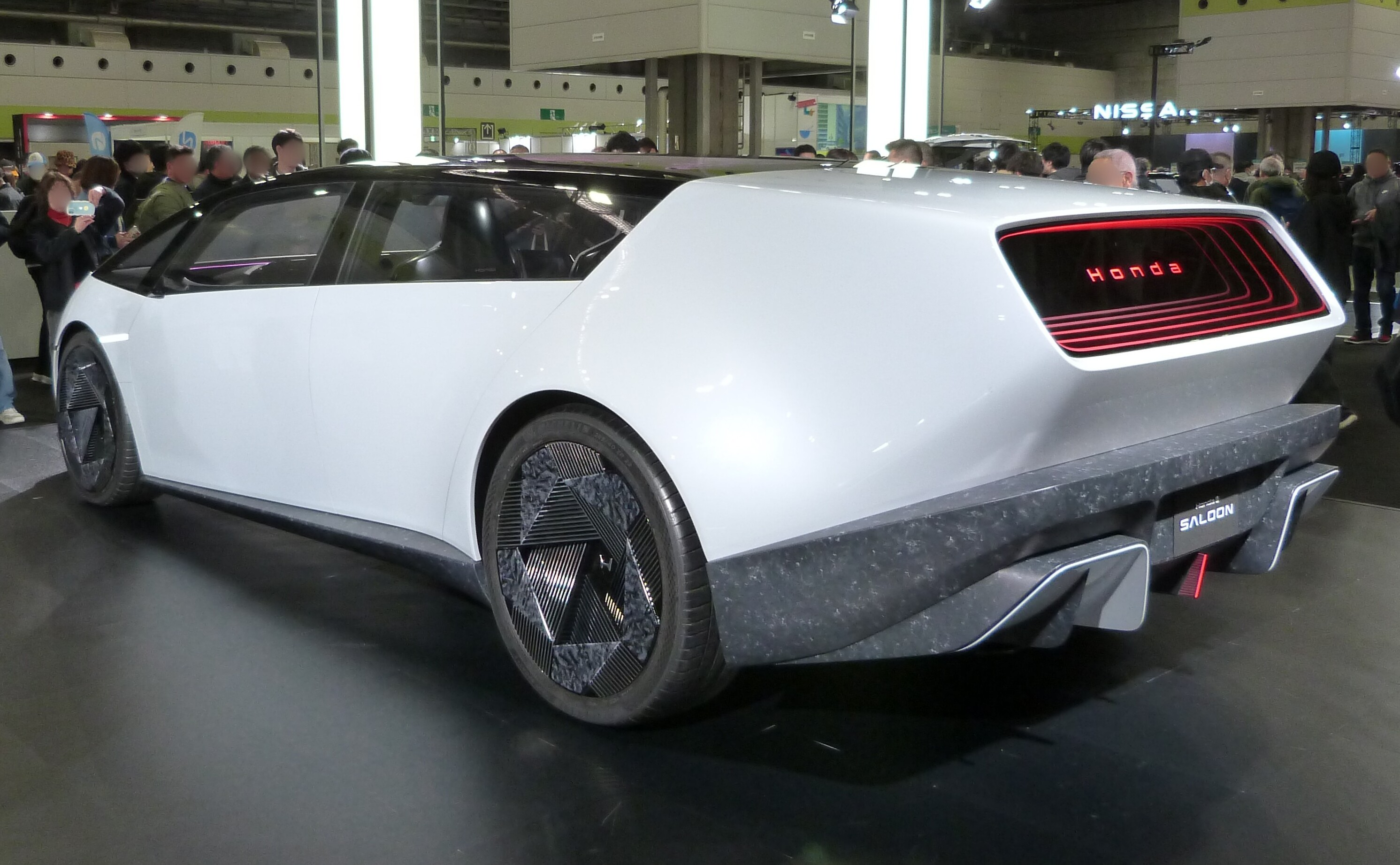
Rear ¾ view

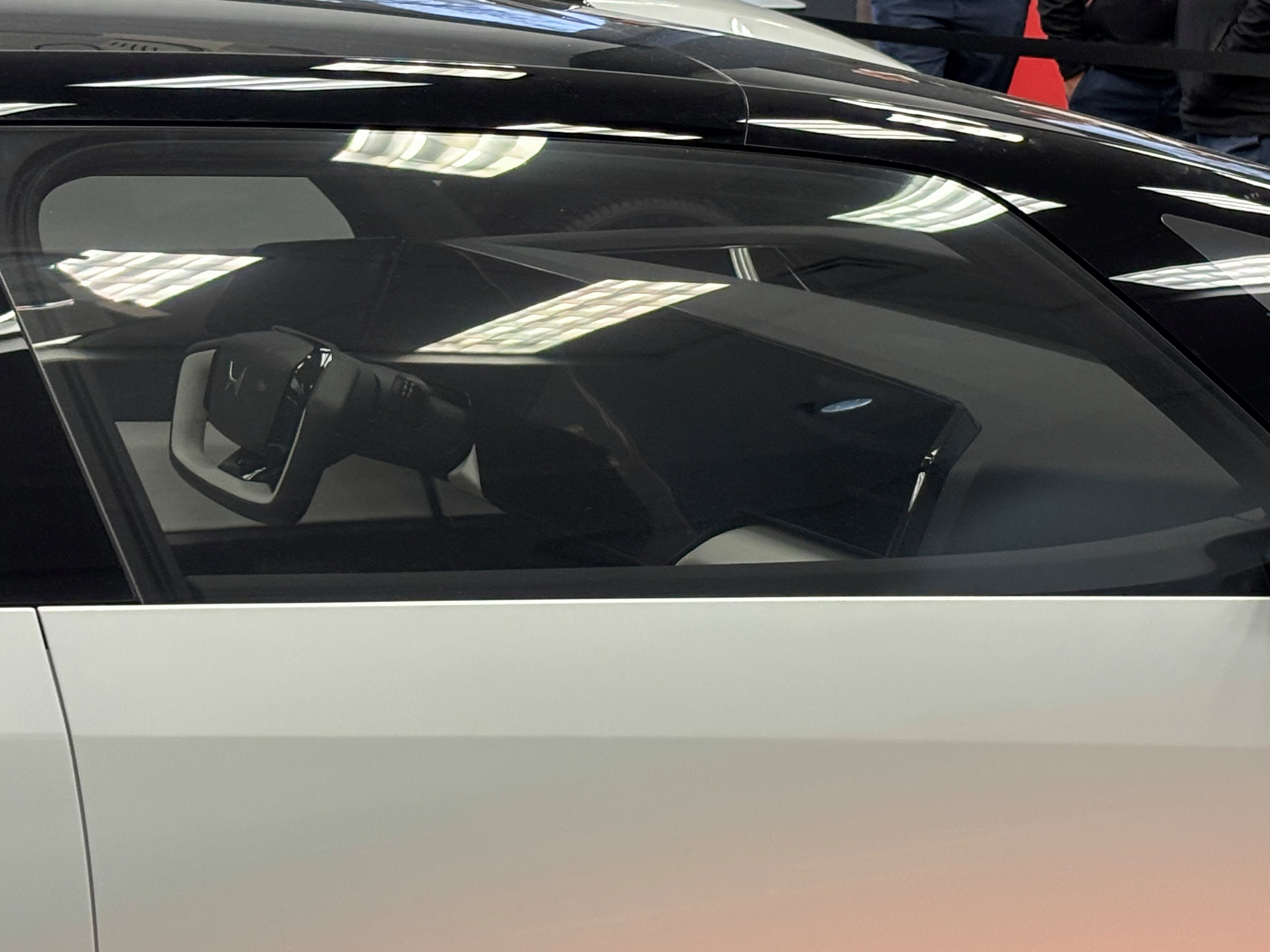
Interior

== See also ==
- Honda Zero
- Honda 0 SUV
