= Marysville Auto Plant =

Automobile plant in Ohio, U.S.

Honda Marysville Auto Plant
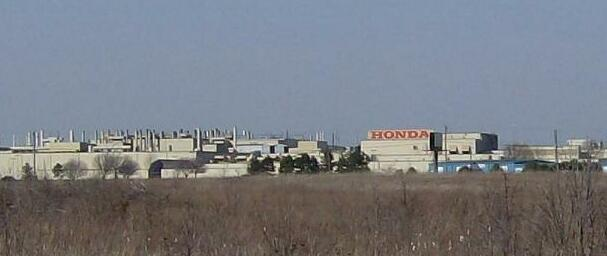
- View of the Marysville Auto Plant from U.S. Route 33.
- Operated: November 1982
- Location: Marysville, Ohio, United States
- Coordinates: 40°16′40″N 83°30′30″W
- Industry: Automotive
- Products: Honda Accord; Acura Integra
- Employees: 4,200
- Volume: 3,600,000 sq ft (330,000 m^{2})
- Owner: Honda
- Website: ohio.honda.com

Honda Marysville Auto Plant (MAP) is a Honda manufacturing facility located approximately six miles northwest of Marysville, Ohio, and 42 miles northwest of Columbus, Ohio, near the intersection of US 33 and State Route 739. Operations include stamping, plastics injection molding, welding, painting, sub-assembly and assembly. The assembly plant opened in 1982.

== Models ==
=== Current ===
- Honda Accord sedan, hybrid (1982–present)
- Acura Integra (2023–present)

=== Discontinued ===
- Acura ILX (2015–2022). Replaced by Acura Integra
- Honda/Acura NSX (2016–2022), built at Performance Manufacturing Center (PMC)
- Acura RDX (2007–2012; moved to East Liberty)
- Honda Gold Wing motorcycles 1979-2009, built at Marysville Motorcycle Plant
- Acura TL (1998–2014) Replaced by Acura TLX
- Acura TLX (2015–2025)
- Acura RSX (2026, cancelled)
- Honda Accord (coupe, discontinued 2017)
- Honda CR-V (2018–2022) Moved away to other plants.
- Honda 0 Saloon (2026, cancelled)
- Honda 0 SUV (2026, cancelled)

== Overhaul ==
The Marysville plant is equivalent in size to 39 Walmart stores under one roof. Honda overhauled the Marysville plant over several years one department after another without losing a day of production. During overhaul, Honda replaced old hydraulic welding systems designed for specific models with programmable electronic welding robots that can weld different vehicle body types for better flexibility and higher productivity. Work started in 2002 in advance of the launch of the 2003 Accord. In 2004, Honda commenced work on a 234,000-square-foot extension of the plant for a new paint facility of US$123 m. The new facility uses high-efficiency ovens, air recycling systems, and more efficient variable drive motors that would save 34 percent energy. The company also built a 20-million-gallon pond behind the plant to recycle rainwater for helping to cool the plant. By recycling runoff from parking lots and roofs, the 7-acre pond system would significantly reduce the use of groundwater and save energy cost. The new fully automated paint shop, which can paint 1,000 vehicles a day, was opened in January 2006. It uses a new waterborne coating system, with 84 Motoman robots, that reduces emissions of hazardous substances by 41 percent.

== Update ==
In December 2015, construction of a new paint shop for Line 1 began, costing US$210 million. The new facility has an annual capacity of 229,000 units. When completed in December 2017, it would be the most energy-efficient paint line of the company's auto production network in U.S. and add 300,000-square-foot to Marysville plant. It replaces a facility built in 1985. Auto body painting can account for upward of 60 percent of an auto plant's total energy use, therefore, cutting its energy use would have a significant environmental impact. The new facility uses a more compact and energy-efficient four-coat, two-bake short process, eliminating one primer-coat curing oven. The new paint process reduces volatile organic compounds emissions by nearly 66 percent.

Honda invested US$220 million in Marysville plant, including an all-new welding shop with 342 new robots for US$165 million to prepare for the new Inner Frame construction technique for the 2018 Accord. The new high-volume laser brazing system joins the roof to the body side panels precisely that it eliminates the black plastic garnish many sedans use to cover the rain channels. Honda also expanded rear door-line production capability to accommodate dropping the coupe from the line-up for model year 2018; brought in-house the sub-assembly of front-end modules of the Accord and added a new sub-assembly for the Intelligent Power Unit, which consists of the battery pack and its control systems, for the 2018 Accord Hybrid.

== See also ==
- List of Honda facilities
- East Liberty Auto Plant
- Marysville Motorcycle Plant
- Japanese community of Columbus, Ohio
