= Honda 0 SUV =

Japanese concept car

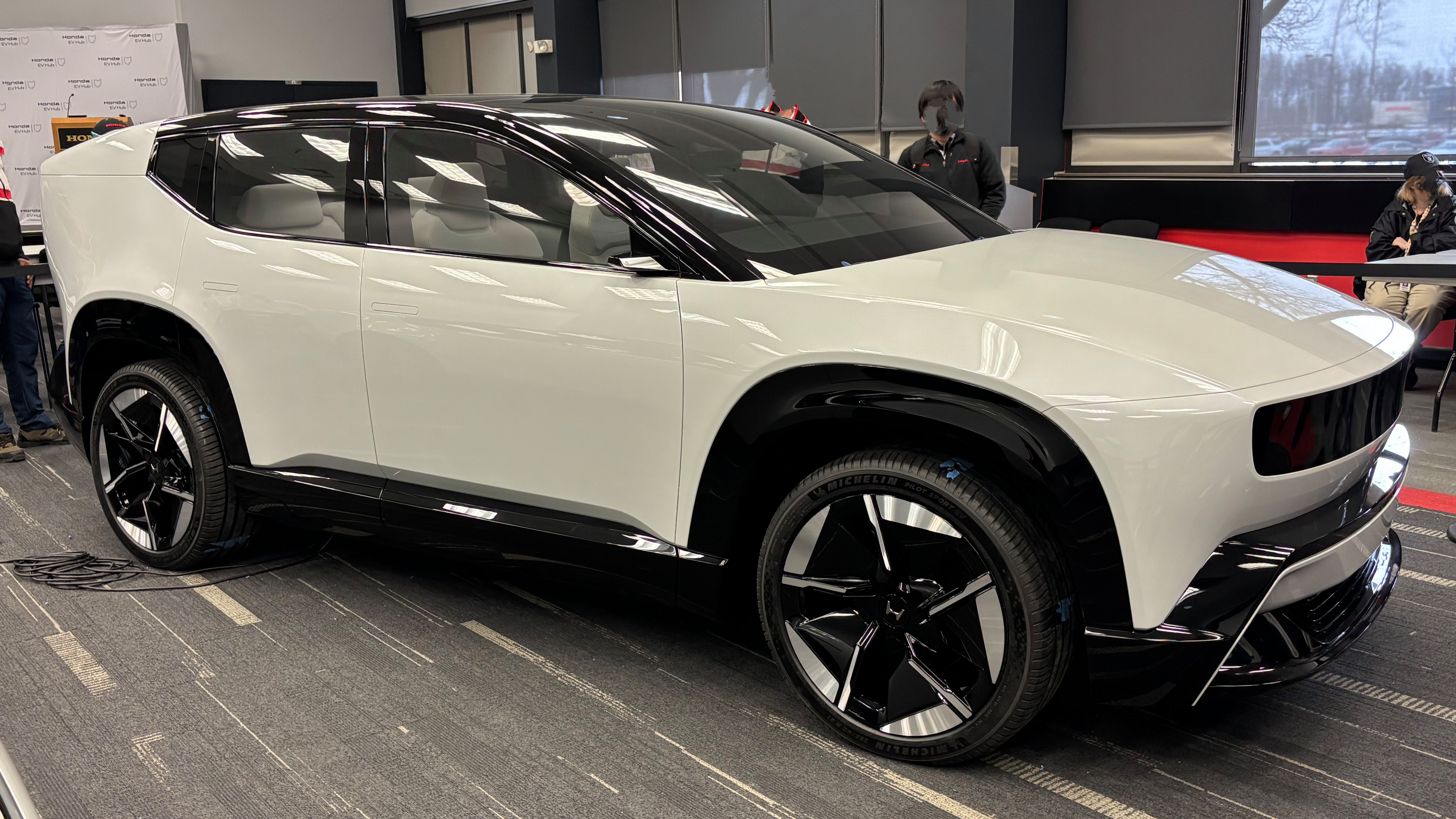
- Honda 0 SUV at Marysville Auto Plant (Marysville, Ohio)

Overview
- Manufacturer: Honda
- Production: Cancelled
- Assembly: United States: Marysville, Ohio (Marysville Auto Plant)

Body and chassis
- Body style: 5-door SUV
- Platform: Zero platform
- Related: Honda 0 Saloon; Acura RSX

Powertrain
- Electric motor: Single or dual-motor

The Honda 0 SUV is a cancelled electric vehicle prototype unveiled by Honda at the 2025 Consumer Electronics Show, as part of the Honda 0 Series in 2025. This mid-size SUV was part of Honda's planned 0 Series, which also included the Honda 0 Saloon. In March 2026, Honda cancelled the 0 SUV, citing US tariffs, cancellation of EV subsidies and competitive pressures which would make launching the vehicle unprofitable.

== Design and architecture ==
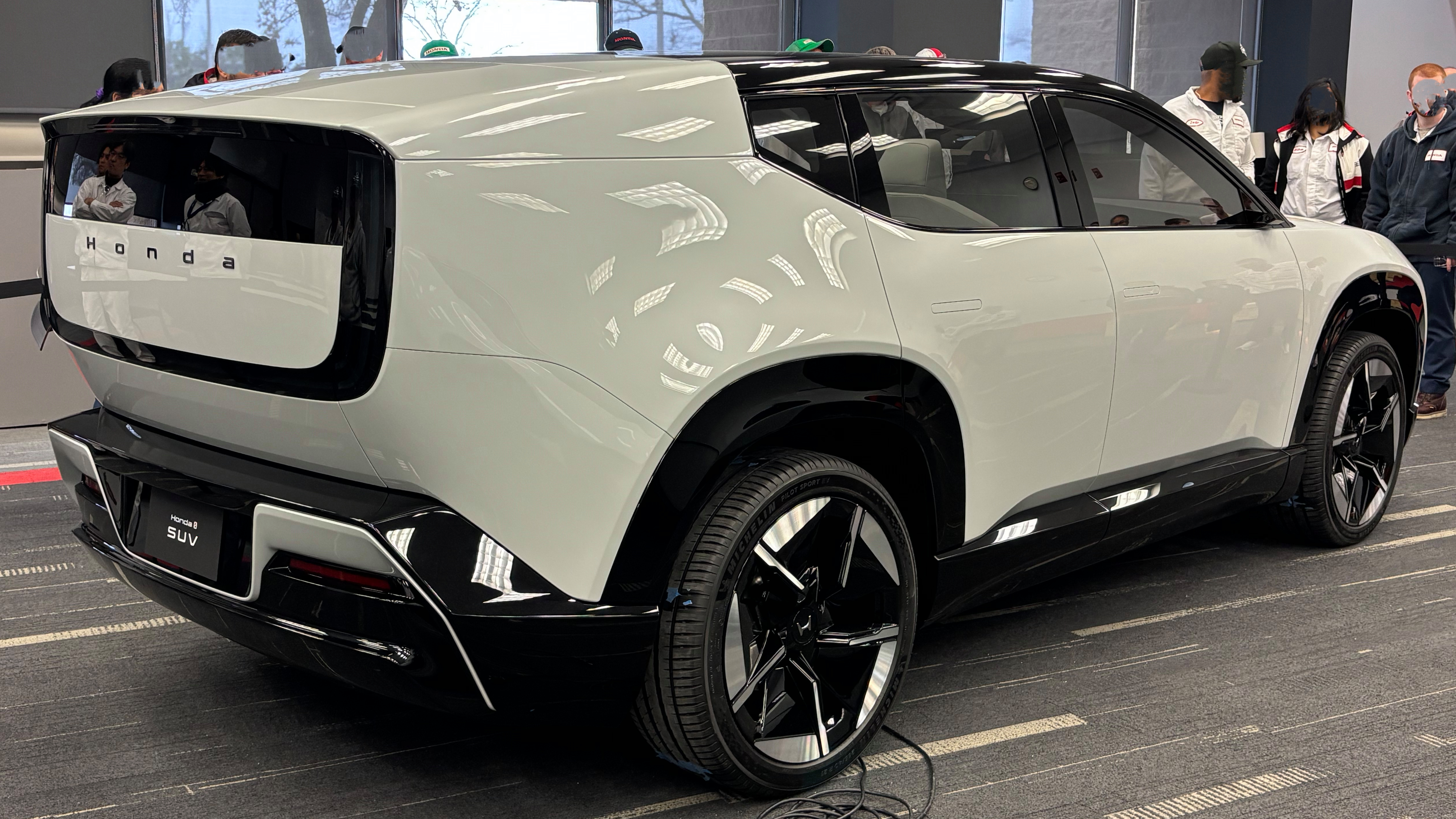
Rear

The Honda 0 SUV follows a design inspired by the Space-Hub concept model. It features a boxy exterior with elements influenced by vehicles from the 1970s and 1980s. The SUV is built on Honda's dedicated EV platform, incorporating a thinner battery design. The interior is designed to maximize space and visibility.

== Technology ==
The vehicle includes an integrated operating system called ASIMO OS, which provides personalized driving experiences. It is also equipped with Level 3 automated driving capabilities, which allow limited hands-free operation under specific conditions. The vehicle's computing system is developed in collaboration with Renesas Electronics Corporation.

== Performance and range ==
The Honda 0 SUV was expected to be available in single and dual-motor configurations. The single-motor version may have delivered approximately 241 horsepower, while the dual-motor, all-wheel-drive version could have provided up to 480 horsepower. The estimated battery capacity is between 80kWh and 90kWh, offering a projected range of around 300 miles per charge.

== Market availability ==
The production version of the Honda 0 SUV was planned for release in North America in 2026, followed by Japan and Europe. Pricing details were not officially announced.

In March 2026, Honda cancelled the 0 SUV, along with the 0 Saloon and Acura RSX due to "the unfavorable impact of changes in U.S. tariff policies" and competitive pressures leading to Honda being "unable to deliver products that offer value for money better than that of newer EV manufacturers".

== See also ==
- Honda Zero
- Honda 0 Saloon
