= Honda Zero =

Electric vehicle series

Honda Zero (stylized as Honda 0) was a series of electric vehicles by Honda. The series' models included a sedan and an SUV. At their CES 2024 unveiling, Honda positioned the concepts as emphasizing aerodynamics over other trends towards thicker and heavier electric vehicle designs. During CES 2025, Honda showcased the prototypes of both concept EVs and were anticipated for a 2026 release in North America, with the Honda 0 SUV having been planned to be the first in production built in their Ohio factory. The vehicles would have been equipped with SAE Level 3 powered by Helm.ai's Deep Teaching technology and featured a new in-house OS named after ASIMO.

In July 2025, Honda announced the cancellation of 0 Large SUV expected in 2027.

Recent leaks from Honda confirmed the battery specifications for its upcoming Zero Alpha EV, which will feature 61 kWh and 75 kWh LFP battery options. The vehicle is expected to deliver a claimed range of over 650 kilometres (404 mi) (likely India's MIDC), with the top-tier variant priced at approximately INR 23 Lakhs. To aggressively target the INR 10 to 20 Lakh EV segment, Honda confirmed that both battery capacities will be available starting from the base variant.

In March 2026, Honda announced the cancellation of 0 Saloon and 0 SUV due to slow demand of EV in North America market, shifting their focus towards hybrids. But they also announced that the entry level Honda 0 Alpha model is on track to be manufactured in India for release in India and Japan in early 2027.

== Models ==
=== Planned ===
- Alpha

=== Concept ===
- 0 Space Hub (2024)
- 0 Saloon (2024)

=== Cancelled ===
- 0 Saloon
- 0 SUV
- 0 Large SUV
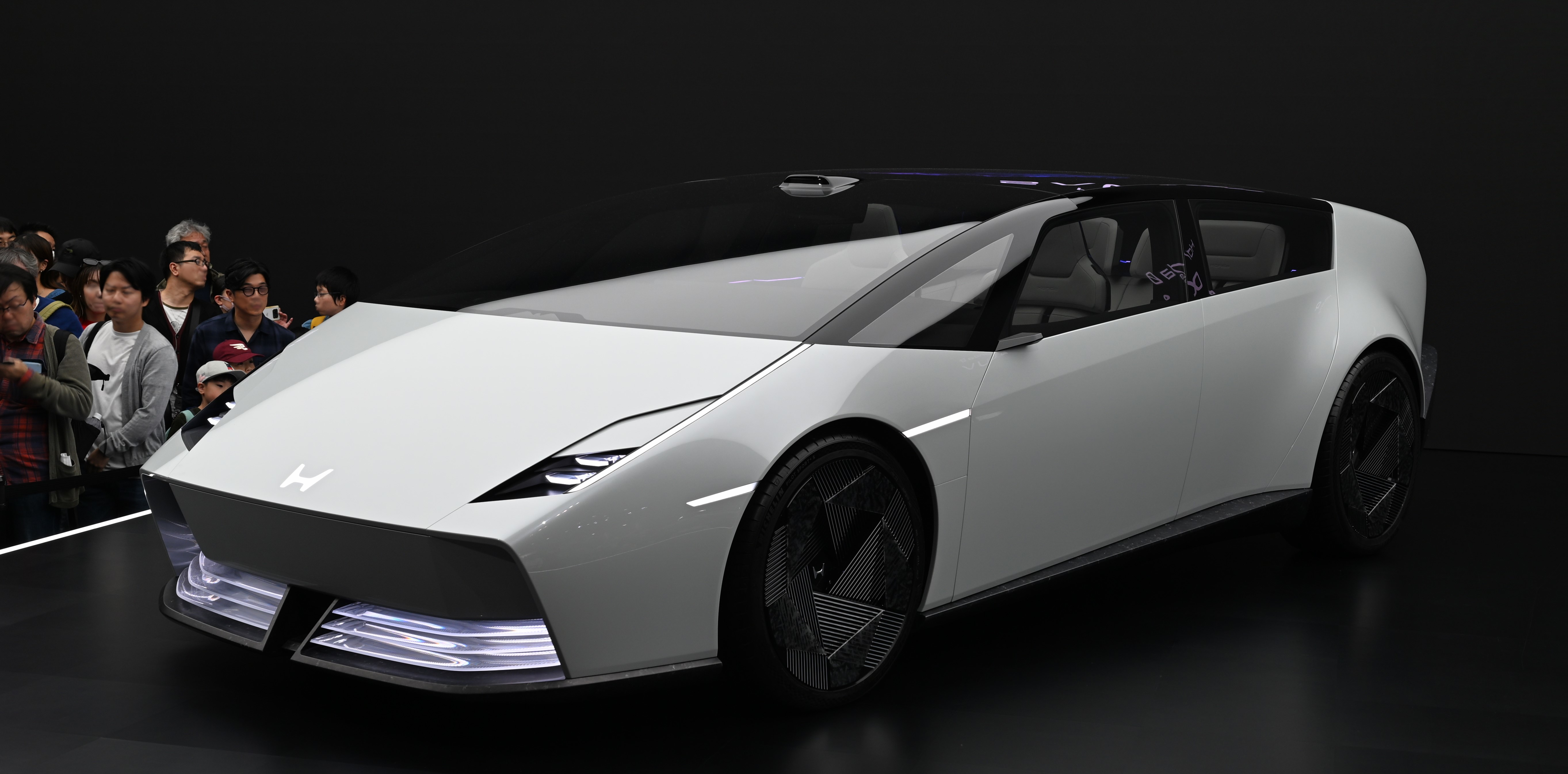
0 Saloon

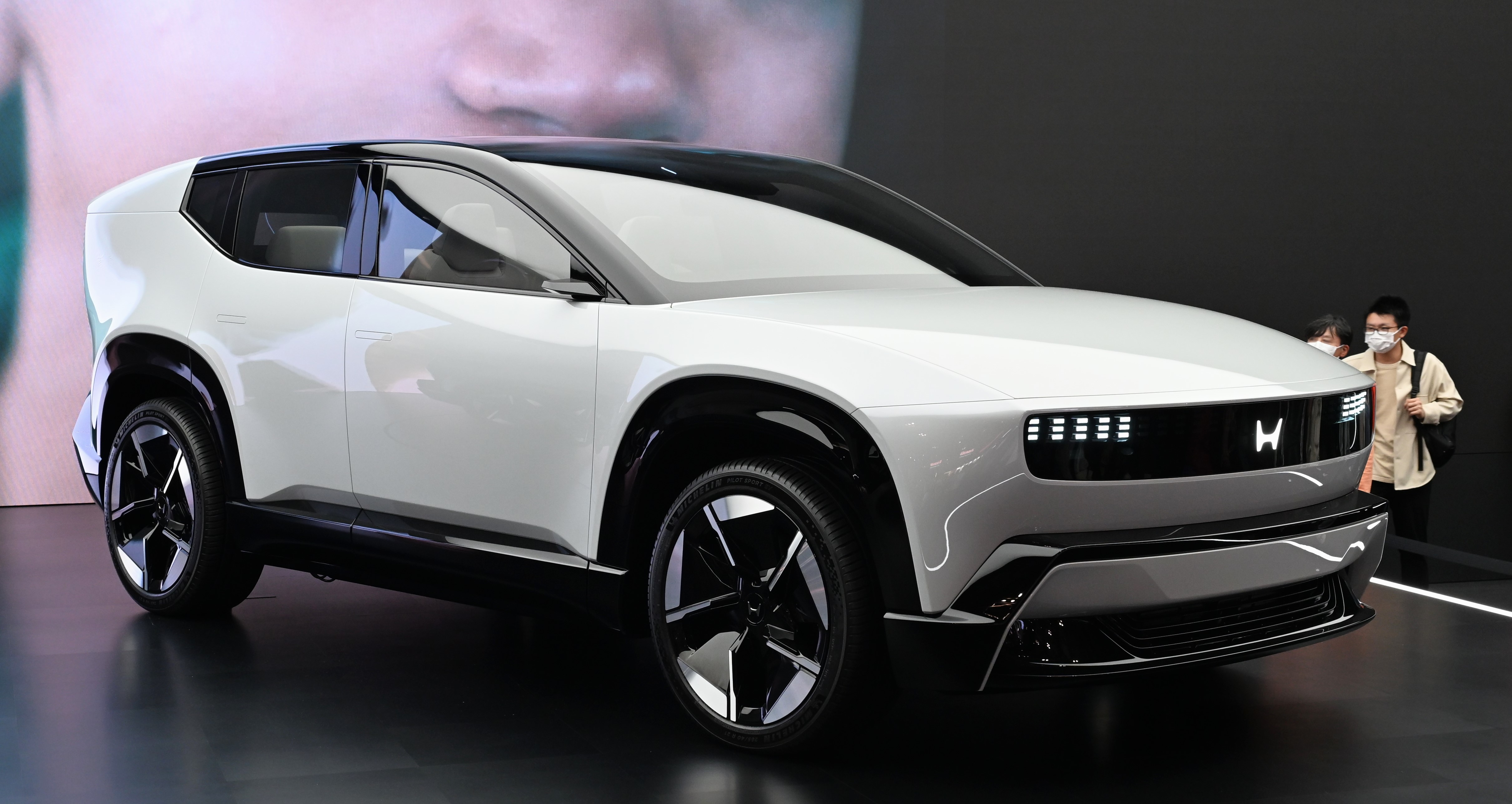
0 SUV

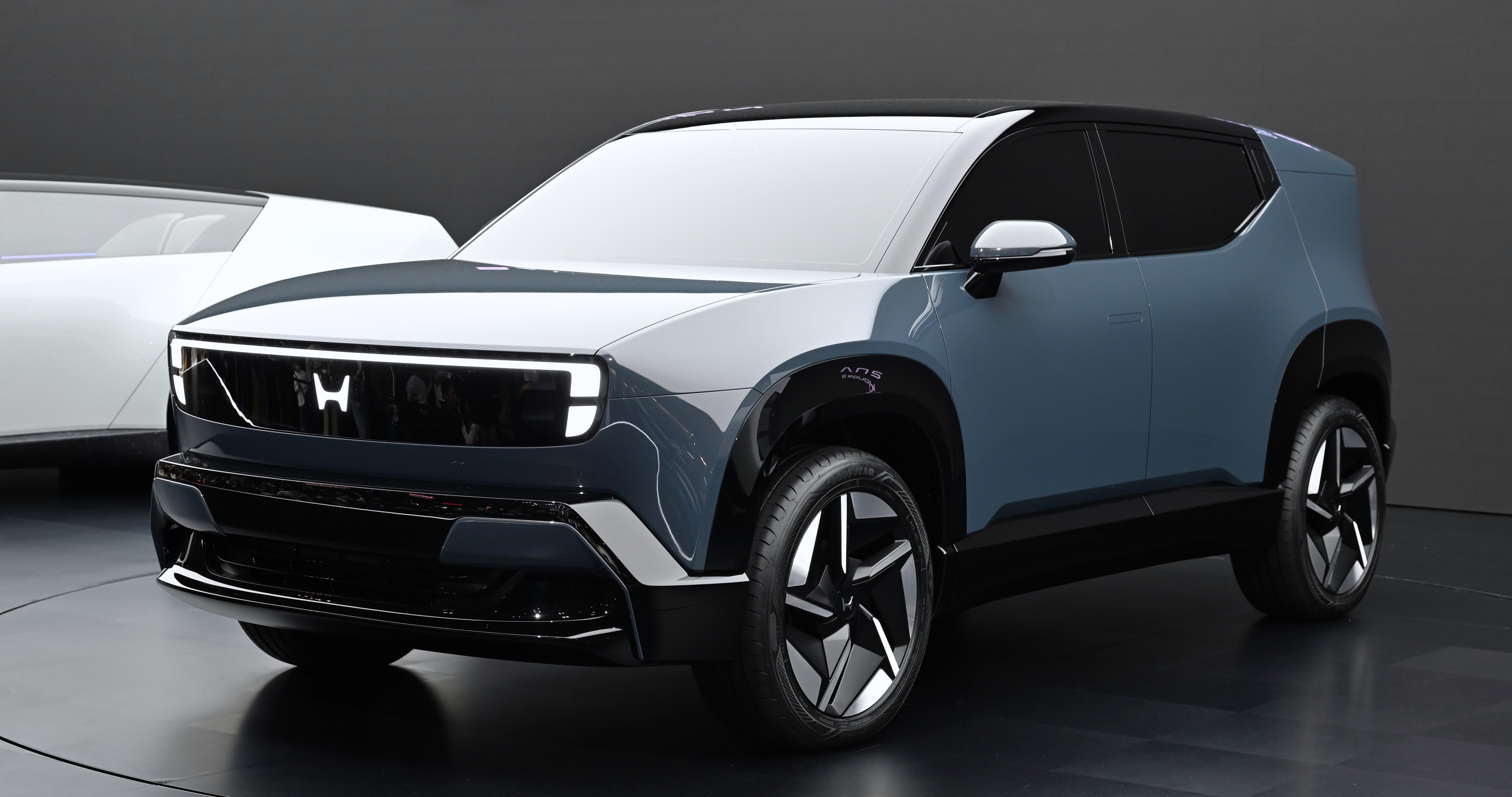
0 α

== See also ==
- Honda Ye
