= Honda Accord (ninth generation) =

Honda Accord Ninth generation (CR1-CR3, CR6-CR7, CT1-CT2)
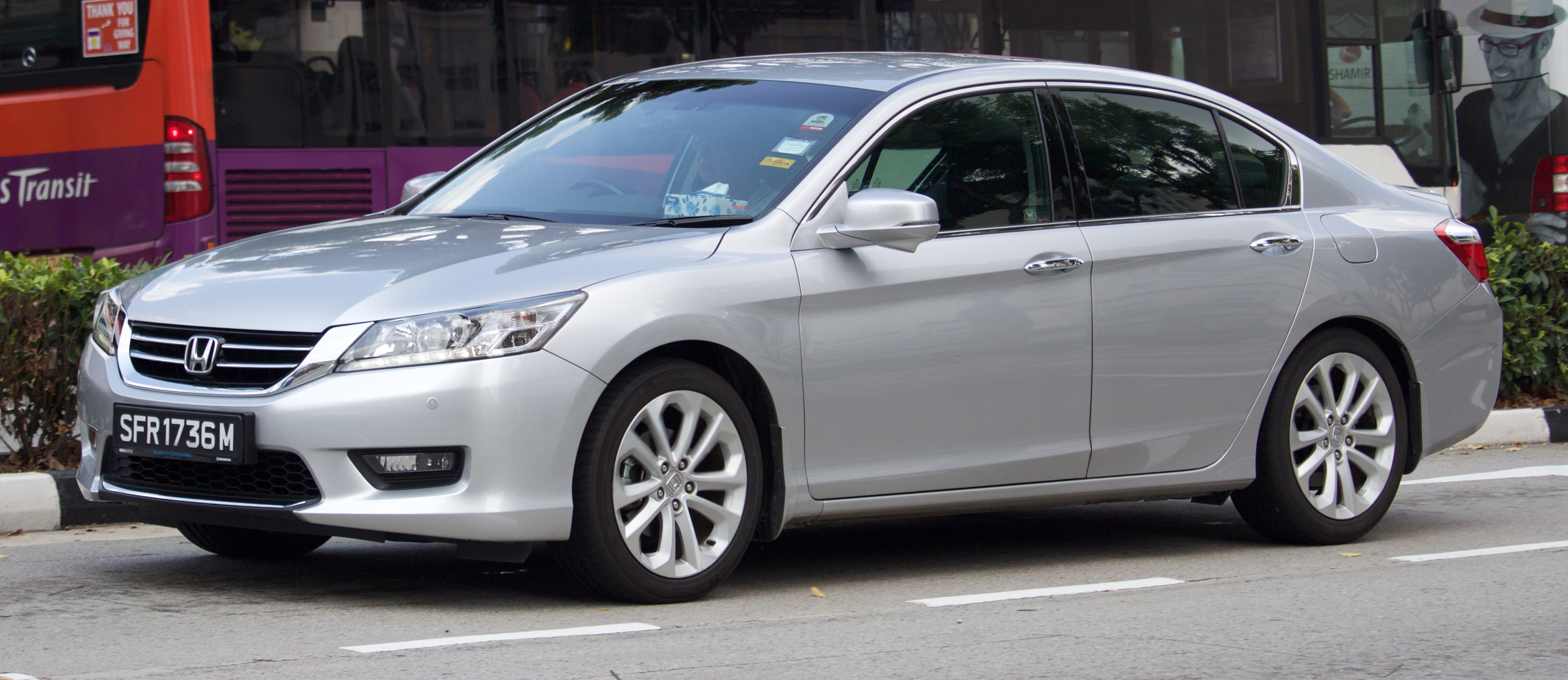
- Honda Accord 2.4 i-VTEC (Singapore; pre-facelift)

Overview
- Manufacturer: Honda
- Production: August 2012–2017 (North America); 2013–2019 (Asia)
- Model years: 2013–2017
- Assembly: United States: Marysville, Ohio (MAP); Japan: Sayama, Saitama; China: Guangzhou (Guangqi Honda); Thailand: Ayutthaya; Malaysia: Alor Gajah, Melaka; Nigeria: Ota, Ogun
- Designer: Riku Wada (2010)

Body and chassis
- Class: Mid-size car (D)
- Body style: 4-door sedan 2-door coupe (North America & Middle East only)
- Layout: Front-engine, front-wheel-drive
- Platform: Honda D-5
- Related: Acura TLX; Honda Spirior

Powertrain
- Engine: 2.0 L R20Z2 I4; 2.0L LFA1 i-VTEC I4 PGM-Fi DOHC i-VTEC + 2 Electric Motors (Accord Hybrid); 2.4 L K24W1 I4; 3.0 L J30A5 V6 (China only); 3.5 L J35Y1 V6 or 3.5 L J35Y2 V6 (6MT coupe)
- Electric motor: 2x AC Synchronous Permanent-Magnet Electric Motor (Accord Hybrid)
- Transmission: CVT (I4); 6-speed manual (I4, V6 Coupe); 5-speed automatic (I4); 6-speed automatic (V6)
- Hybrid drivetrain: Series hybrid with paralleling clutch (Accord Hybrid)

Dimensions
- Wheelbase: Sedan: 2,776 mm (109.3 in); Coupe: 2,725 mm (107.3 in)
- Length: Sedan: 4,862 mm (191.4 in); Coupe: 4,806 mm (189.2 in)
- Width: Sedan: 1,849 mm (72.8 in)
- Height: Sedan: 1,466 mm (57.7 in); Coupe: 1,435 mm (56.5 in)
- Curb weight: 3,193 lb (1,448 kg) sedan

Chronology
- Predecessor: Honda Accord (North America eighth generation); Honda Accord (Japan and Europe eighth generation); Honda Inspire (North America & Japan)
- Successor: Honda Accord (tenth generation); Honda Prelude (sixth generation)

The ninth generation Accord is a mid-size car introduced by Honda in 2012 which received a refreshed front fascia, grille, headlights, tail lights and alloy wheel designs for the 2016 model year. With the discontinuation of the smaller European and Japanese market Accord in 2015, the larger North American Accord became the only version in production, with the Hybrid version taking over as the flagship of Honda's automotive product in many markets that once received the smaller Accord.

== Overview ==
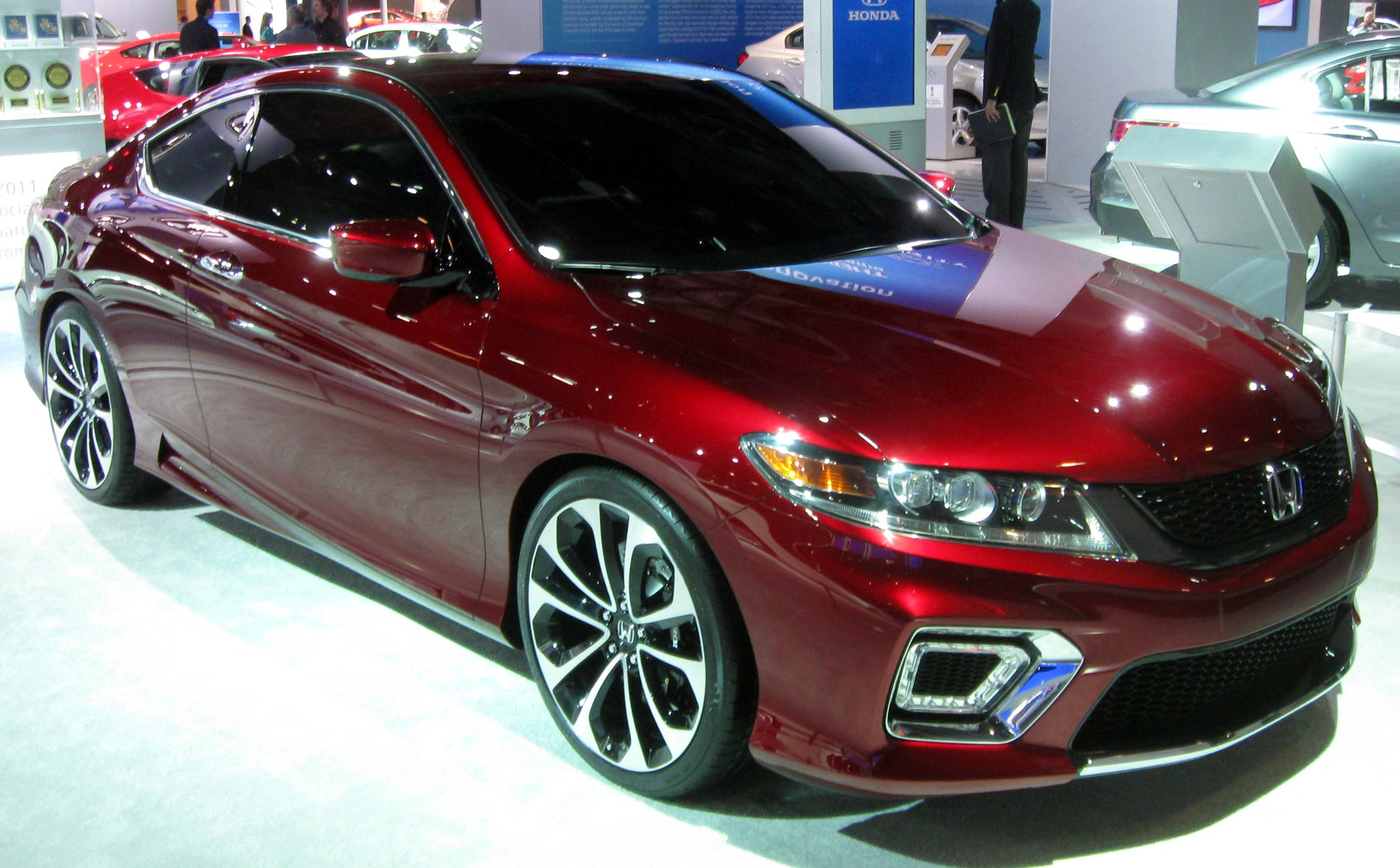
2013 Accord Coupé Concept

For the ninth generation Accord, Honda appointed Shoji Matsui, who served as an engineer on the Accord platform from 1985 to 1996 as lead project manager. It is the first Honda vehicle to be completely developed under the administration of Honda CEO Takanobu Ito.

Honda revealed the Accord Coupe Concept at the January 2012 North American International Auto Show in Detroit. In August 2012, the company released initial details pertaining to the 2013 Accord sedan, and production versions of both the sedan and coupe were fully unveiled in early September 2012.

== Production ==
The model year 2013 Accord was released on 5 September 2012, with the sedan hitting dealers' lots on 19 September 2012 in the United States and the coupe following on 15 October 2012. Corresponding release dates in Canada for the sedan and coupe models are 24 September 2012 and 1 November 2012, respectively. In February 2013, the Accord was scheduled to enter the Russian market. In June 2013, the Accord hybrid and plug-in hybrid were introduced to the Japanese market, with the discontinuation of the Honda Inspire, serving as Honda's large sedan and one level below the Honda Legend.

All Accords come with standard an 8-inch 480x320 pixel WQVGA resolution LCD screen, single angle backup camera, Honda's i-MID system which includes Bluetooth hands free calling with SMS texting and streaming audio, USB connector, dual zone automatic climate control and alloy wheels. The available navigation system adds a 6-inch touchscreen and the 8-inch screen uses a higher 800x480 pixel resolution WVGA display. A tri-angle (normal, wide and top view) backup camera and wide angle passenger blind spot side view camera are also available. New safety features include an optional forward collision warning system, lane departure warning system and blind spot monitor. EX and higher trims offer Smart Key, LED daytime running lamps, headlamps, and tail lamps; and an adaptive cruise control system.

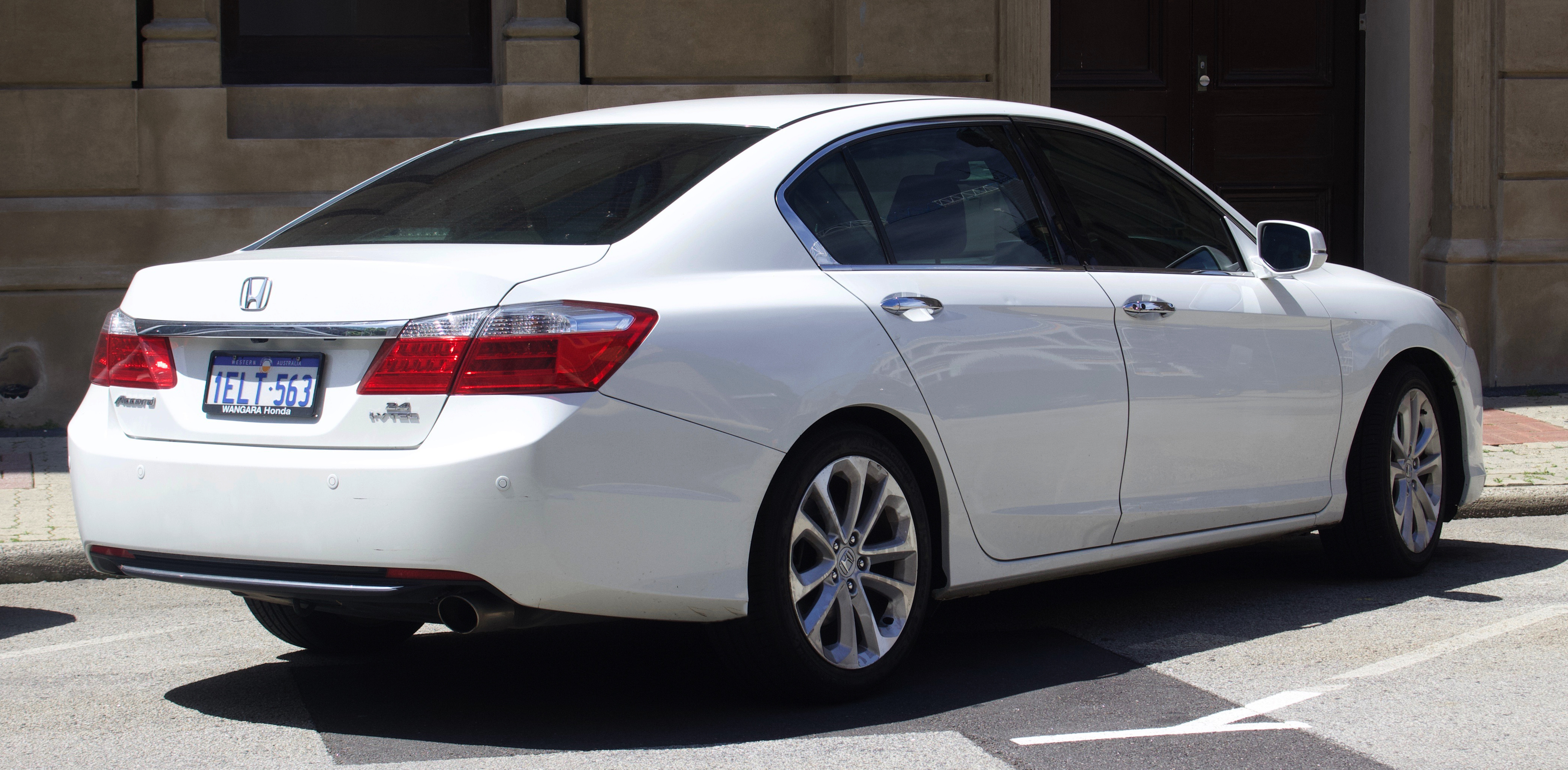
Accord VTi-L (Australia; pre-facelift)

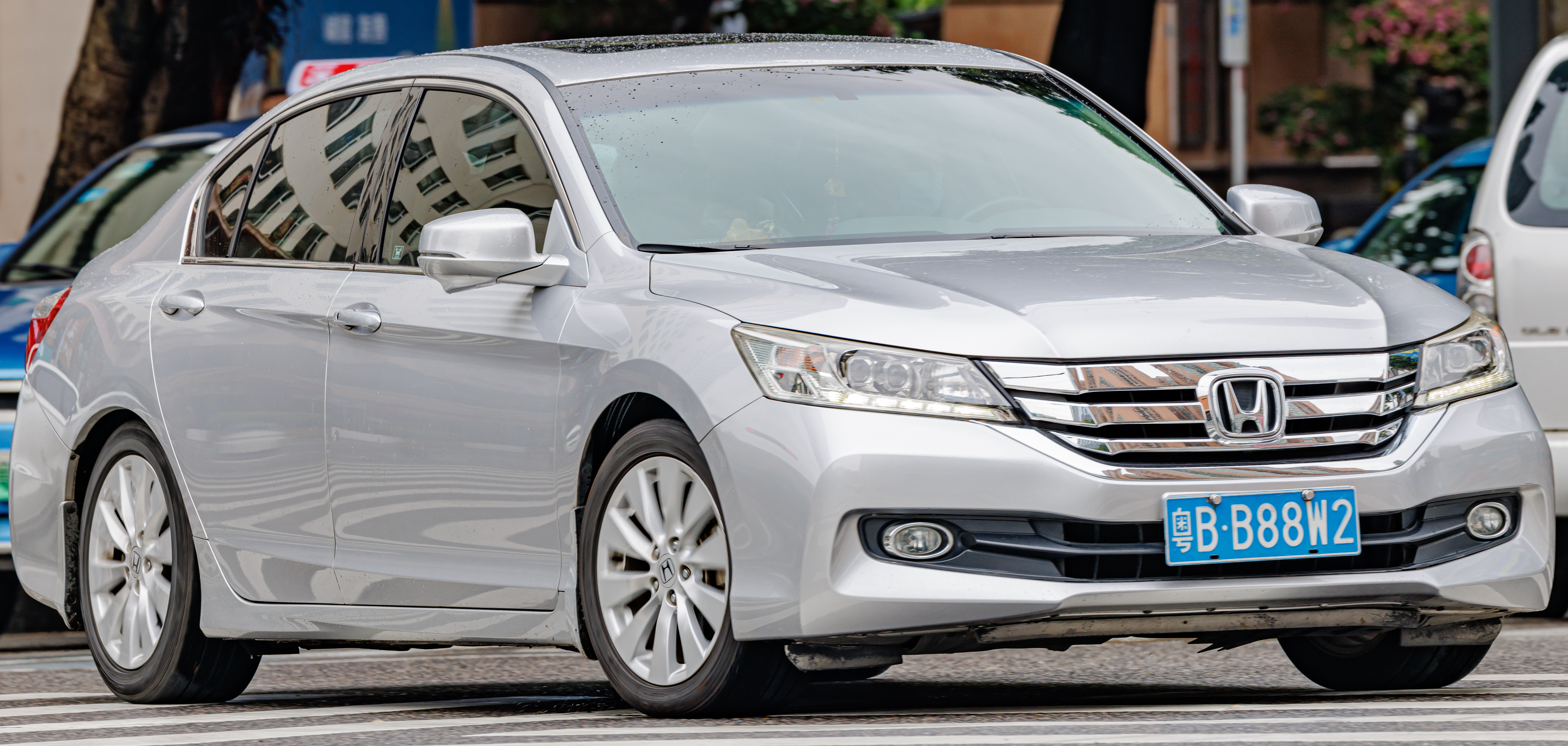

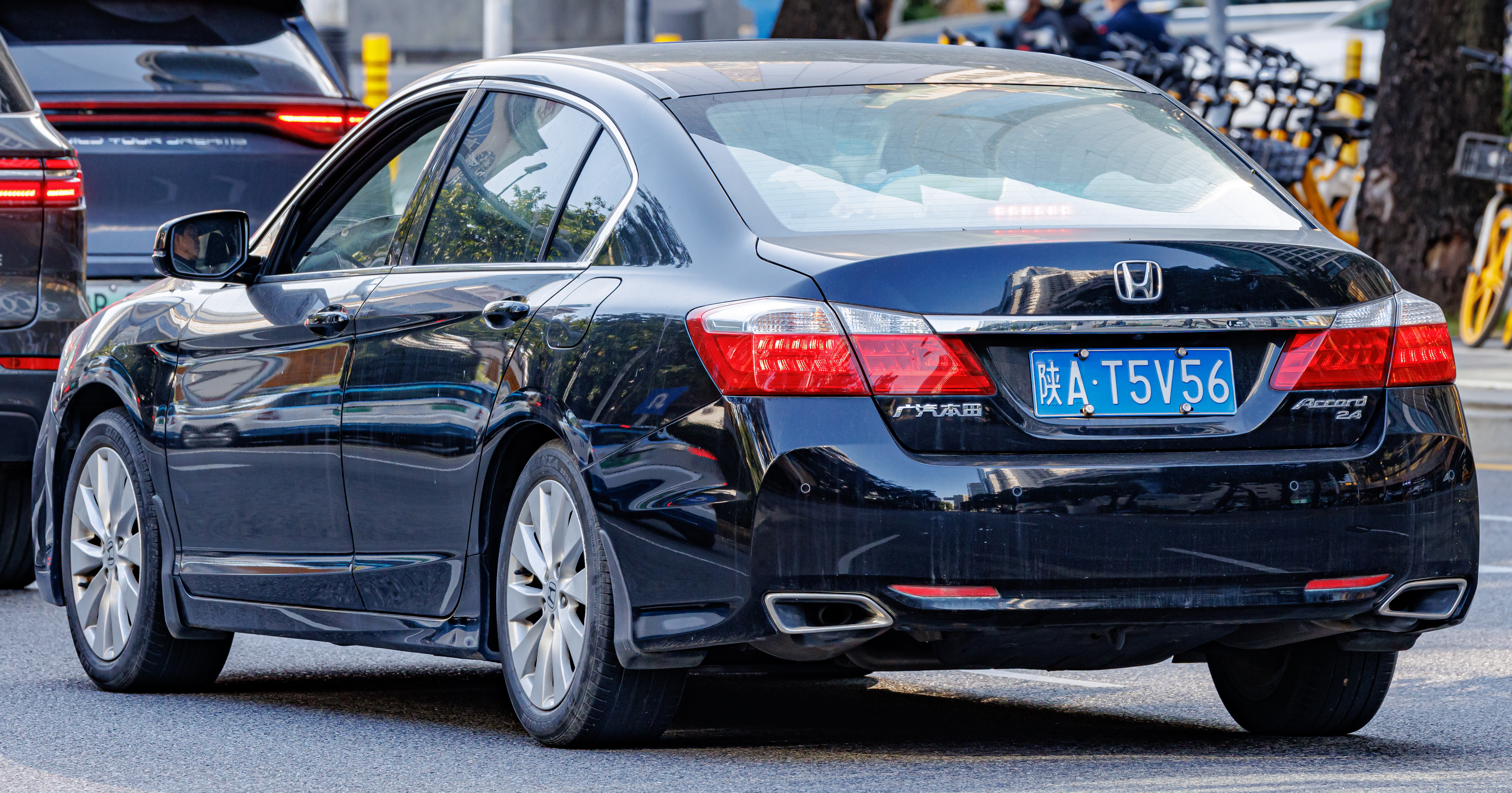
GAC-Honda Accord (China; pre-facelift)

In Australia, the ninth generation Accord went on sale in June 2013. It is available with either a 2.4 L 129 kW (173 hp) four-cylinder or 3.5 L 206 kW (276 hp) V6 engine. Unlike the North American market Accord, a CVT transmission is not offered. Instead, the four-cylinder uses a five-speed automatic, while the V6 receives a new six-speed automatic.

In China, the ninth generation Accord went on sale in September 2013, as a 2014 model. It is available with a choice of 2.0L or 2.4L 4-cylinder engines, or a new 3.0L V6 engine exclusive to the Chinese market. The V6 produces 192 kW (257 hp) and 297 Nm torque. Transmission choices include a CVT for both 4-cylinder engines or 6-speed automatic for the V6; a manual transmission is not offered. The Chinese market Accord features a unique front grille and bumper, incorporating more chrome and smaller, circular front fog lights. The rear features a different bumper with trapezoidal, rather than circular, exhausts.

In Indonesia, the ninth generation Accord was launched on 25 April 2013 and comes available in two trims; the 2.4 VTi and 2.4 VTi-L. All variants are mated to a 5-speed automatic transmission. The facelifted Accord was launched on 7 April 2016 at the 24th Indonesia International Motor Show and is only available in 2.4 VTi-L.

In Malaysia, the ninth generation Accord was launched in September 2013 and comes available in three trims; the 2.0 VTi, 2.0 VTi-L and 2.4 VTi-L. The 2.0 variants use an improved R20Z1 engine while the 2.4 variant uses the all-new Earth Dreams 2.4L engine. All variants are mated to a 5-speed torque converter gear box. The facelifted Accord was launched in September 2015 in the same three trims but with added features and equipment to each trim. It also comes with three new colors; White Orchid Pearl, Obsidian Blue Pearl and Lunar Silver Metallic. In November 2017, the 2.4 VTi-L variant gained Honda's Sensing safety features.

In the Philippines, the ninth generation Accord was launched in 2014 available in two trims: the 2.4 S and 3.5 SV. The 2.4 S variant is available only with five-speed automatic transmission while the 3.5 SV is available with six-speed automatic transmission. The 3.5 SV features a 3.5L SOHC V6 engine, dual exhaust, sunroof and different designed wheels. All models received daytime running lights, reverse camera with dynamic guidelines, active cornering lights, rain sensing wipers, touch screen display panel, ECO assist button and LED Head/Tail lamps. The Philippine-spec model is imported from Thailand.

In the United States the ninth generation Honda Accord comes in LX, Sport, EX, EX-L, & Touring trims. The LX, EX, & EX-L comes equipped with a 2.4L Inline 4 with 185hp and 181 ft lbs of torque mated to Hondas first use of a CVT in the Accord, while the Accord Sport gets a small power boost to 189hp and 182 ft lbs of torque also with the new CVT. The other engine option is a 3.5L V6 which is standard on the TOURING and optional on the EX-L. The V6 makes 278hp and 252 ft lbs of torque with a new 6 Speed Automatic.

=== Accord Hybrid ===
The Accord Hybrid was introduced in June 2013 for the Japanese market. In the United States, it was introduced in October 2013 for the 2014 model year. It featured a 2.0 L I4 Atkinson cycle engine paired with a hybrid system that serves the function of a traditional transmission, called the Electric Continuously Variable Transmission (E-CVT) by Honda. The hybrid system was a dual motor system combined with a 1.3 kWh lithium-ion battery pack. A main benefit of the Accord over the standard gasoline model was its high fuel economy, reaching 50 MPG city, 45 MPG highway, and 47 MPG combined. The Accord Hybrid produced 196 total horsepower and had a 0-60 time tested by Car and Driver as 7.2 seconds. In order to save weight, the Accord Hybrid had an all-aluminum front subframe and rear bumper beam to replace the steel-and-aluminum subframe used on the standard Accord sedan.

In terms of exterior looks, the Accord Hybrid was distinguished from the Accord sedan with blue-accented headlights, grille trim, and taillights. They also featured 17-inch alloy wheels that were exclusive to the Hybrid (non-plug-in) models. Hybrid badges were placed on the front fenders and the rear trunk lid. As a result of the placement of the hybrid battery in the trunk, the trunk storage area was reduced by approximately three cubic feet, going from 15.8 cubic feet on the gasoline sedan to 12.7 cubic feet on the Hybrid.

Honda did not produce a 2016 model year Accord Hybrid, as they were in the process of moving production from Ohio to Japan. The hybrid model did return in 2017, though.

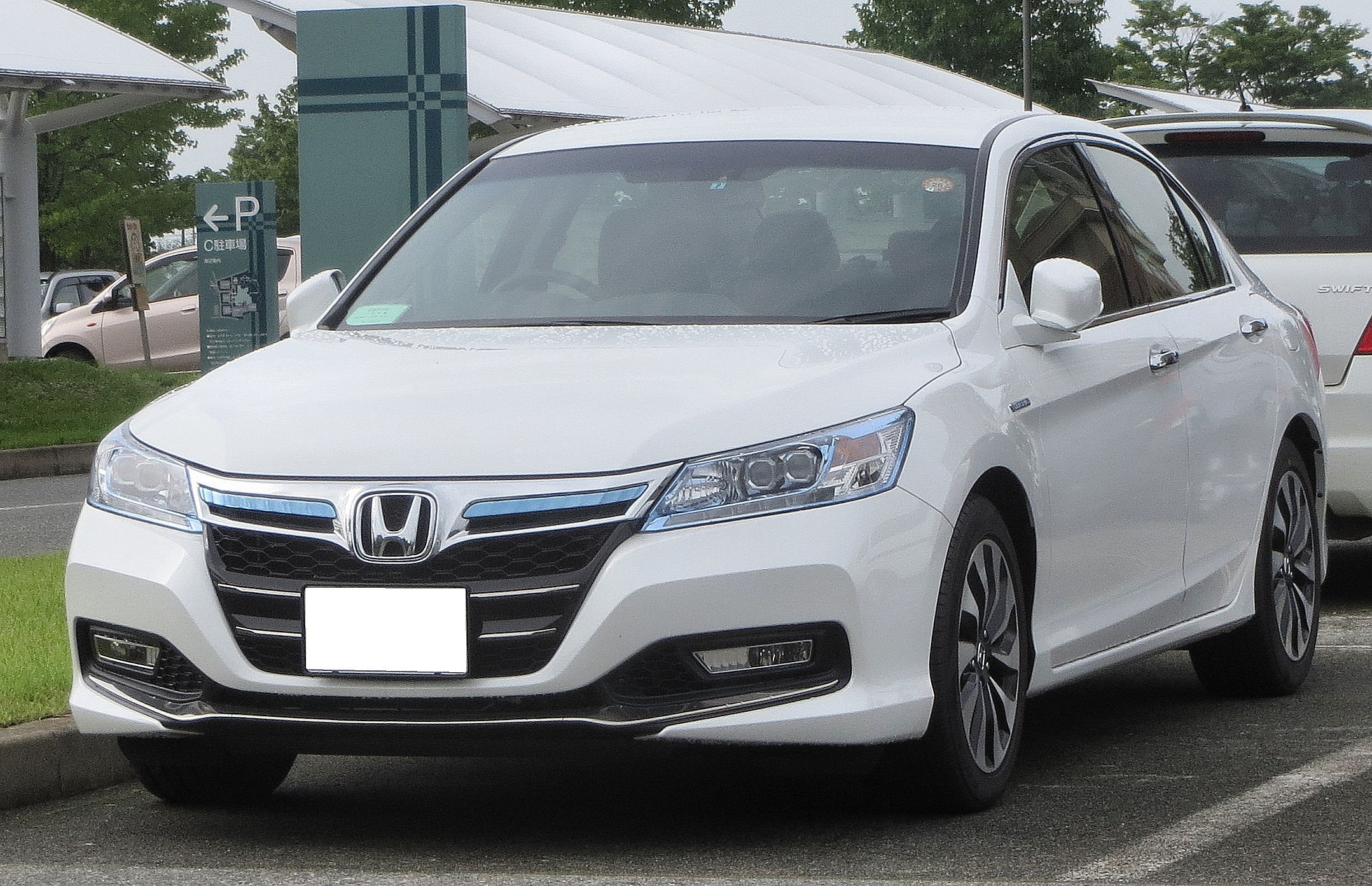
Accord Hybrid (Japan; pre-facelift)

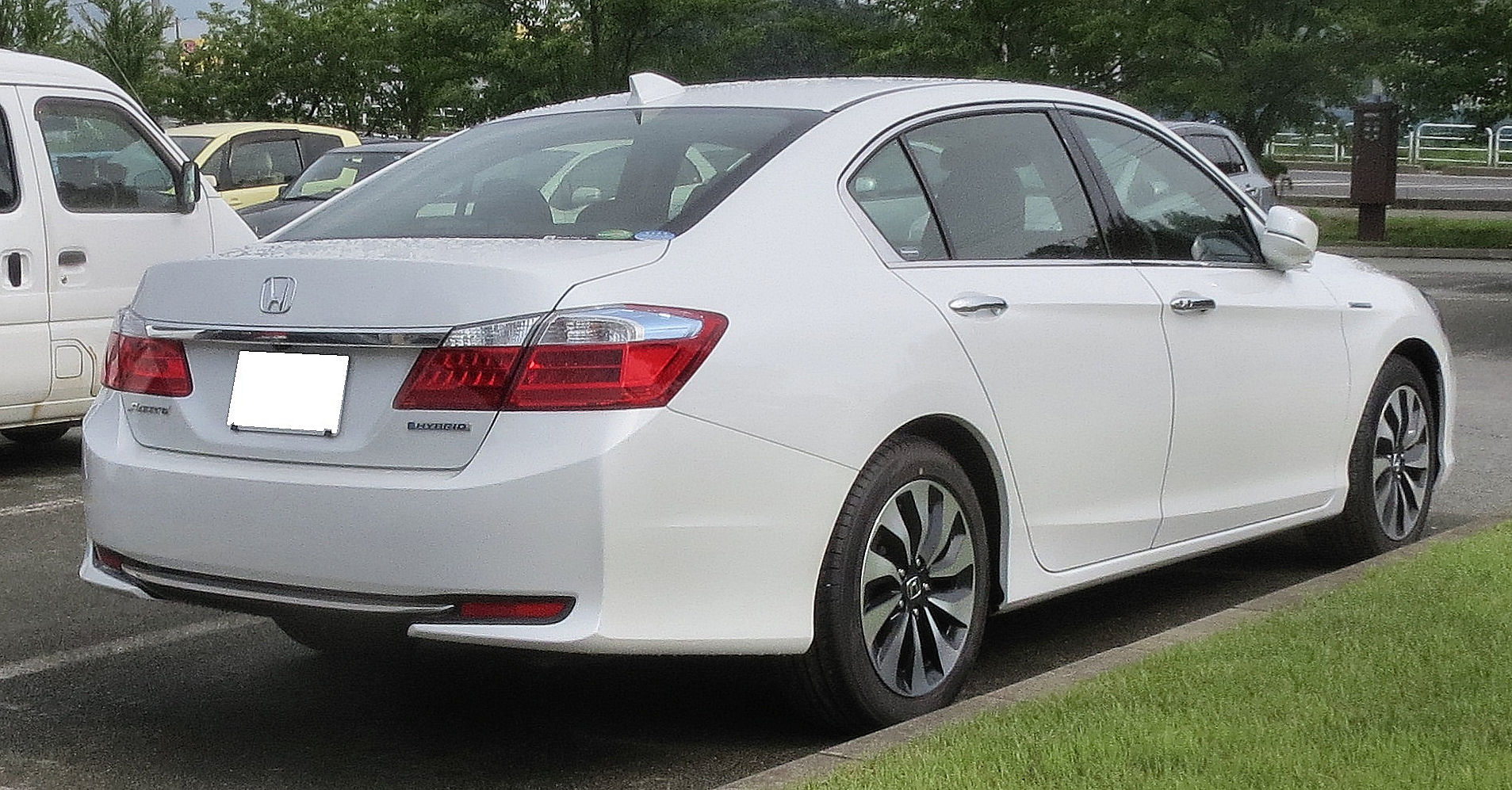
Accord Hybrid (Japan; pre-facelift)

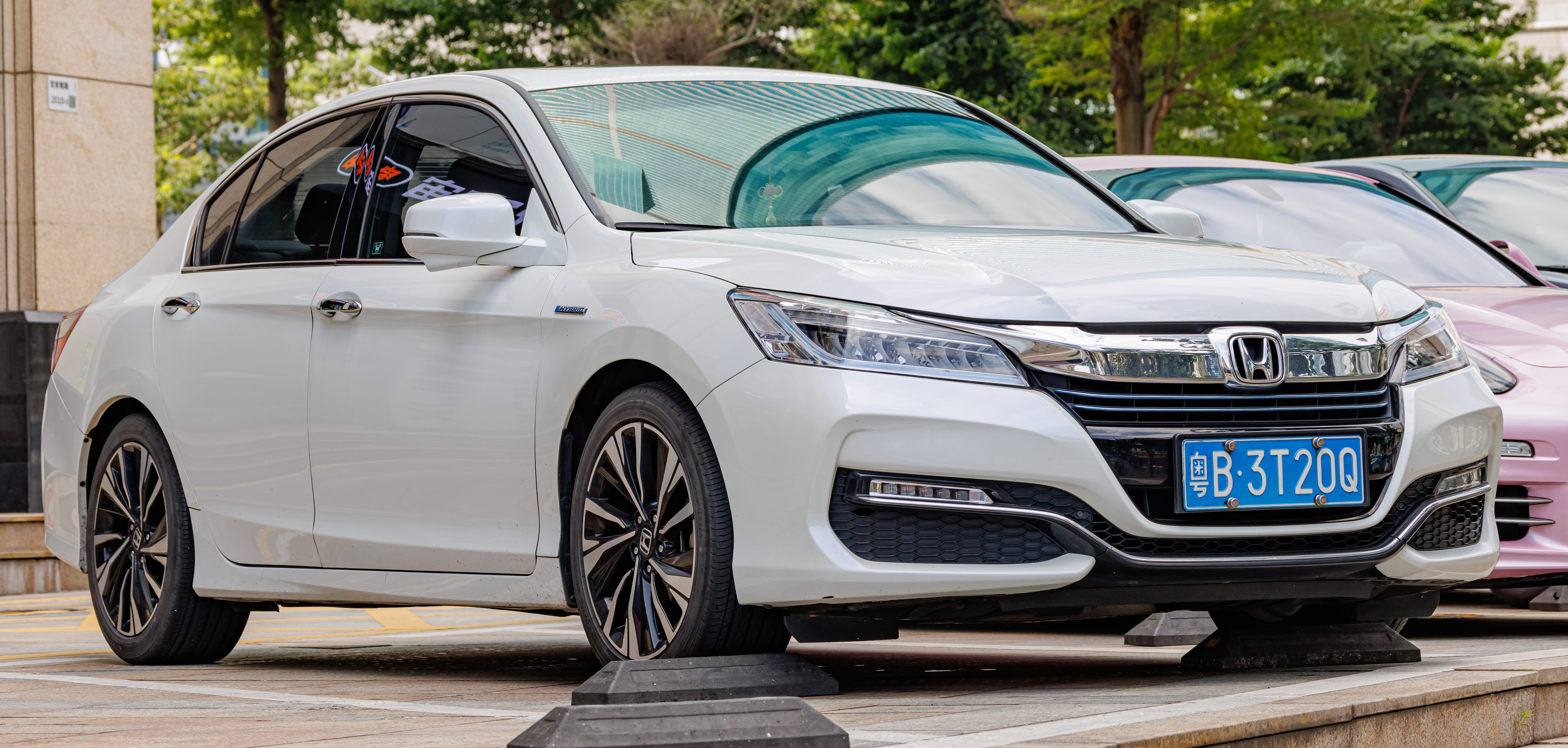
GAC-Honda Accord Hybrid (facelift)

=== Accord Plug-in Hybrid ===
Honda Accord Plug-in Hybrid (CR5)
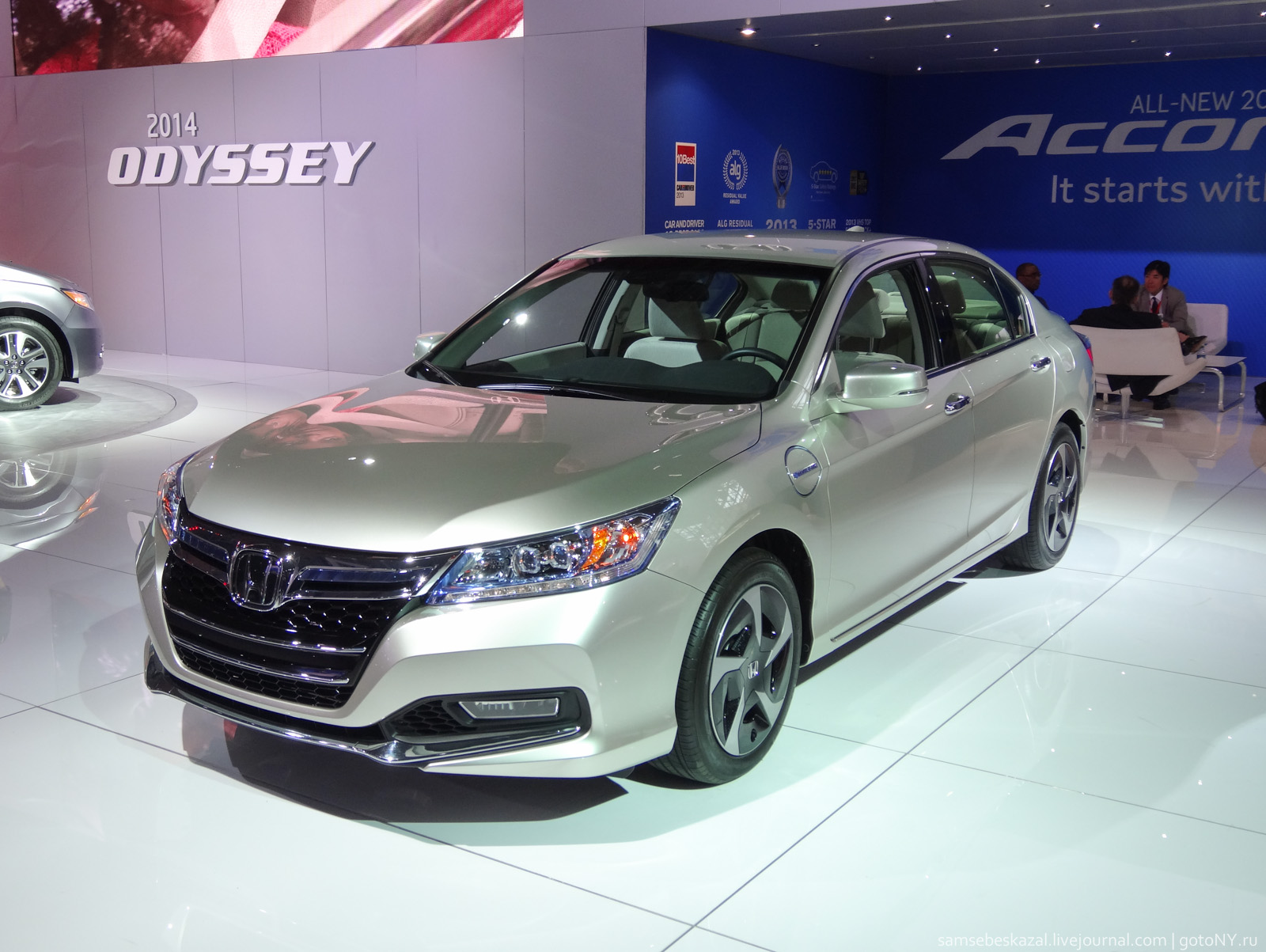

Overview
- Manufacturer: Honda
- Production: 2013–2014
- Model years: 2014

Body and chassis
- Class: Mid-size car
- Body style: 4-door sedan
- Layout: Front-engine, front-wheel-drive

Powertrain
- Engine: 2.0 L LFA1 i-VTEC I4 PGM-Fi DOHC i-VTEC
- Electric motor: 2x AC Synchronous Permanent-Magnet Electric Motor
- Transmission: Electronic Continuously Variable Transmission (E-CVT)
- Battery: 6.7 kWh lithium-ion battery
- Electric range: 13 mi (21 km) (EPA)

Dimensions
- Wheelbase: 2,776 mm (109.3 in)
- Length: 4,910 mm (193.3 in)
- Width: 1,849 mm (72.8 in)
- Height: 1,466 mm (57.7 in)
- Curb weight: 3,799 lb (1,723 kg)

Chronology
- Successor: Honda Clarity PHEV

The production version of the 2014 Accord Plug-in hybrid was first shown at the 2012 Los Angeles Auto Show. The Accord PHEV pricing starts at US$39,780 and sales began in the U.S. in January 2013, with availability limited to California and New York. The Accord PHEV was introduced in Japan in June 2013 and it is available only for leasing, primarily to corporations and government agencies. As of December 2013, the Accord PHEV ranks as the third best selling plug-in hybrid in the Japanese market. A total of 1,039 units have been sold in the United States through 2015.

Honda unveiled the platform for a mid-size plug-in hybrid electric vehicle at the 2010 Los Angeles Auto Show. The plug-in platform showcased Honda's next-generation two-motor hybrid system, which continuously moves through three different modes to maximize driving efficiency: all-electric, gasoline-electric and an engine direct-drive mode. The plug-in hybrid also uses regenerative braking to charge the battery. In all-electric mode, the vehicle uses a 7 kWh lithium-ion battery and a 120 kW electric motor. The all-electric mode achieves a range of approximately 10 to 15 mi (16 to 24 km) in city driving and a top speed of 62 mph (100 km/h). Fully recharging the battery will take 2 to 2.5 hours using a 120-volt outlet and 1 to 1.5 hours using a 240-volt outlet. Honda announced at the 2012 North American International Auto Show in Detroit that first US application of both a 2.4-liter direct-injected engine and two-motor plug-in hybrid system to be implemented on the Accord ninth generation, the 2013 Accord Plug-in Hybrid. Production of the Accord Plug-in Hybrid began on 21 December 2012, the same day California Air Resources Board approved the car to be sold in the state.

Hybrid badge of the 2014 Accord Plug-in Hybrid

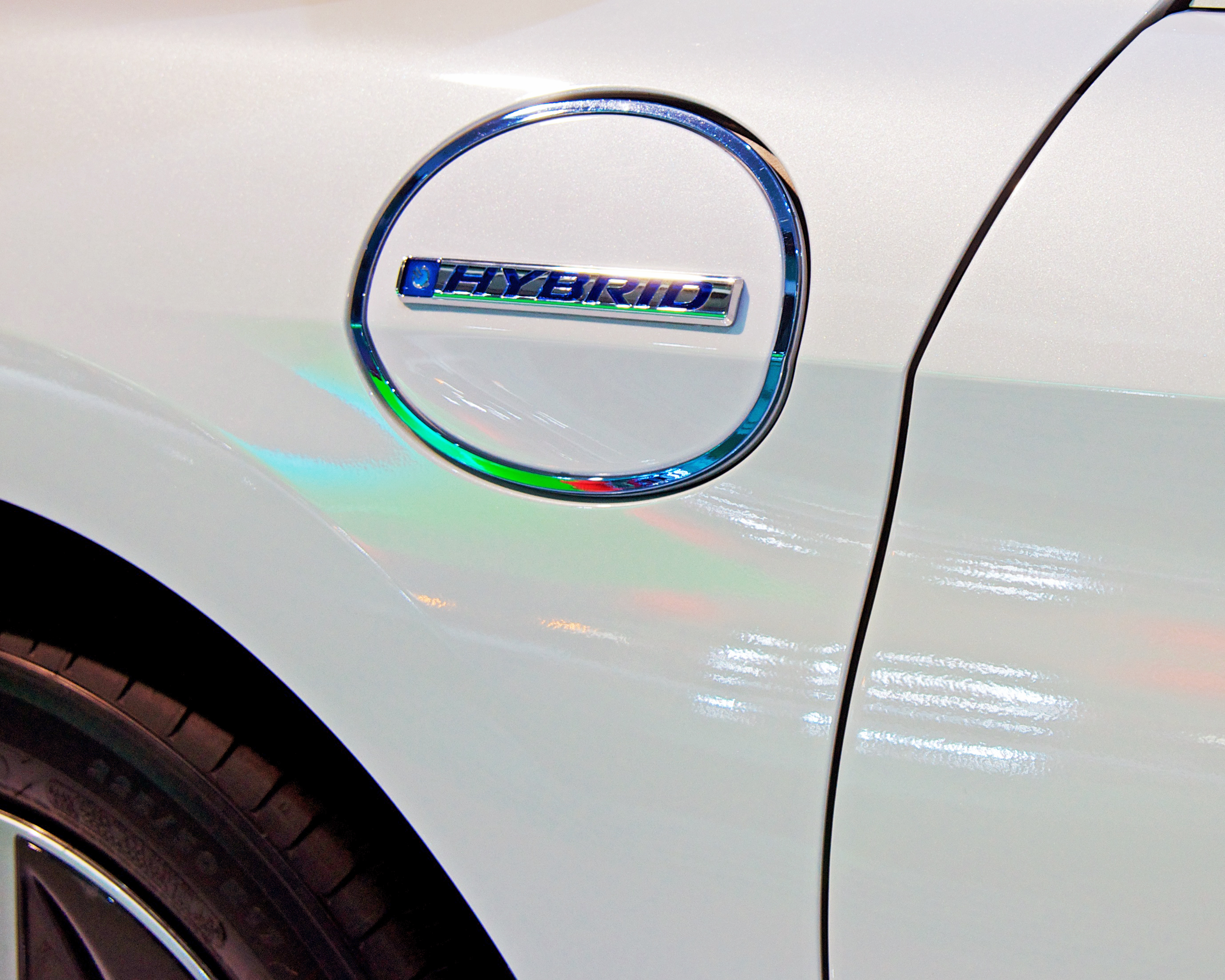
Charging port of the 2014 Accord Plug-in Hybrid

In September 2012, Honda announced that the Accord Plug-in Hybrid sedan will be built in Sayama, Japan that would be available in a single trim level based on the standard features of the Accord Touring. The Accord Plug-in Hybrid was scheduled for release in early 2013, and would serve as the basis for the conventional hybrid version of the Accord Sedan that would go on sale by mid-2013. It features a 6.7 kWh lithium-ion battery pack to power a 124 kW electric motor mated with the new Earth Dreams i-VTEC 2.0-liter 4-cylinder Atkinson-cycle gasoline engine producing 137 hp (102 kW) at 6200 rpm, and together the total system output is 196 hp (146 kW), which surpasses that of the Toyota Prius Plug-in Hybrid (134 hp), Chevrolet Volt (149 hp) and Ford Fusion Energi (195 hp) plug-in hybrid.

Honda expected the 2014 Accord Plug-in Hybrid to deliver an all-electric range of up to 15 mi (24 km) and a total driving range of more than 500 mi (800 km) based on the U.S. EPA tests as determined by Honda. The carmaker also expected the fuel economy for the Accord Plug-in Hybrid to exceed 100 miles per gallon of gasoline equivalent (MPG-e) (2.4 L/100 km; 120 mpg-imp equivalent), and also expects it to receive an Enhanced AT-PZEV rating from the California Air Resources Board (CARB).

The official EPA ratings for the plug-in hybrid are 13 mi (21 km) of all-electric range with a combined fuel economy rating of 115 miles per gallon of gasoline equivalent (MPG-e), the highest in its class. EPA ratings for operation in hybrid mode are 46 mpg_{‑US} (5.1 L/100 km; 55 mpg_{‑imp}) in combined city/highway cycle, 47 mpg_{‑US} (5.0 L/100 km; 56 mpg_{‑imp}) in city, and 46 mpg_{‑US} (5.1 L/100 km; 55 mpg_{‑imp}) in highway driving. The 2014 Accord PHEV emits only 20 milligrams of combined smog-forming emissions per mile and becomes the first car in the U.S. to meet the new LEV3/SULEV20 emissions standards, and will get single-occupant carpool access in California.

=== Plug-in and Natural Gas GX discontinued ===
The Accord Plug-in Hybrid was discontinued after the 2014 model year, together with the Civic Hybrid and the natural gas-powered Honda Civic GX. This decision was due in part to Honda's ability to advance fuel economy through conventional engine technology. In 2017, Honda launched the Honda Clarity plug-in hybrid and battery electric vehicle, after the introduction of the next-generation Clarity fuel cell vehicle in 2016.

=== 2016 facelift and 2017 Hybrid ===
The ninth generation Accord received a facelift for the 2016 model year. Changes to outer appearance include new front fascia, grille, head lights, rear lights, and new alloy wheel designs on all of the trims. The 2016 Accord was the first mass-market car to be equipped with Apple CarPlay and the second car to also be compatible with Android Auto. The Hybrid Accord returned for the 2017 model year with revised running gear that has combined output of 214 hp (160 kW), up from 196 hp (146 kW) of the 2014 & 2015 model years version. The Plug-in Hybrid Accord did not make a return, instead was replaced by the 2018 Honda Clarity PHEV.

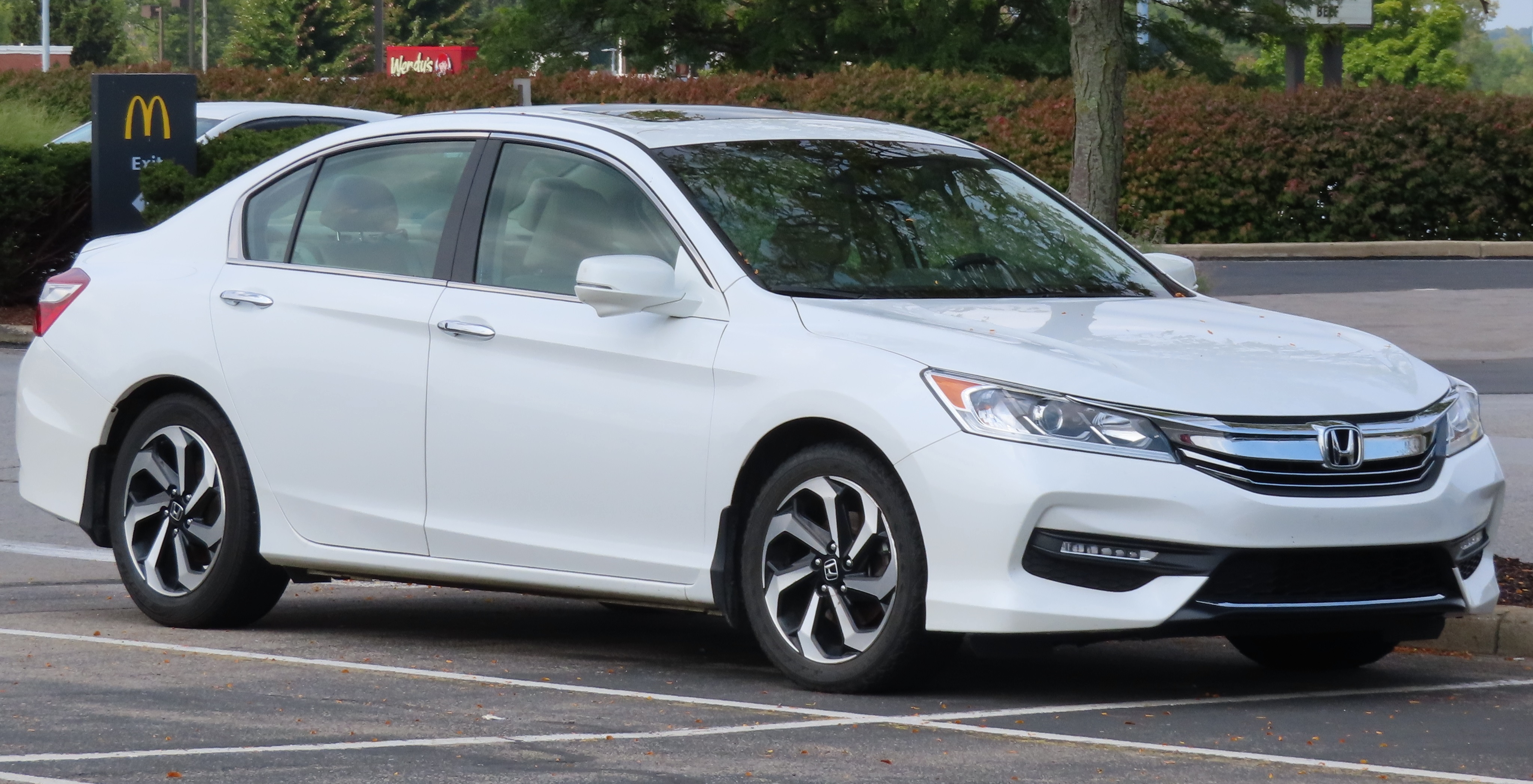
Accord EX-L (US; facelift)

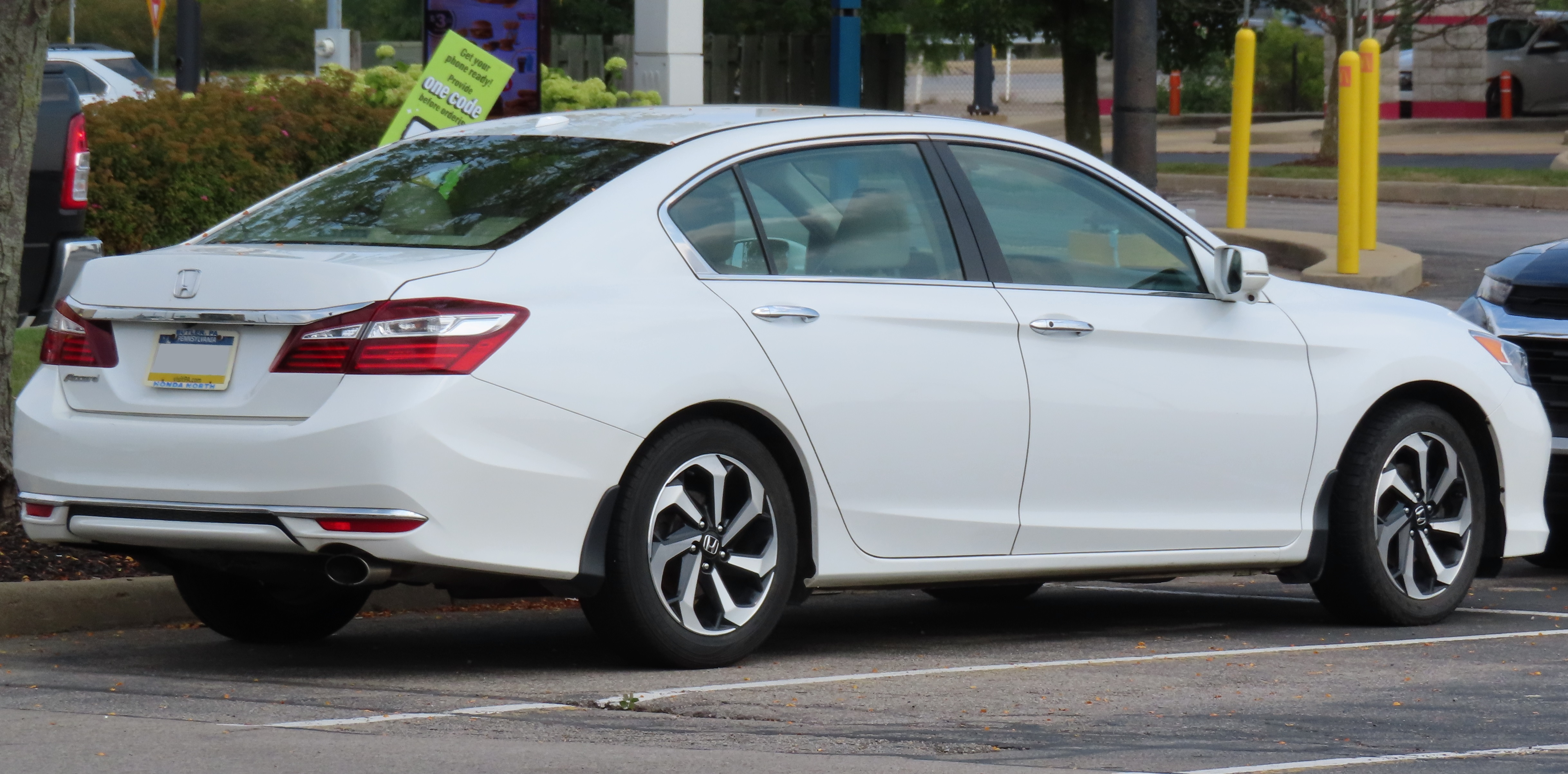
Accord EX-L (US; facelift)

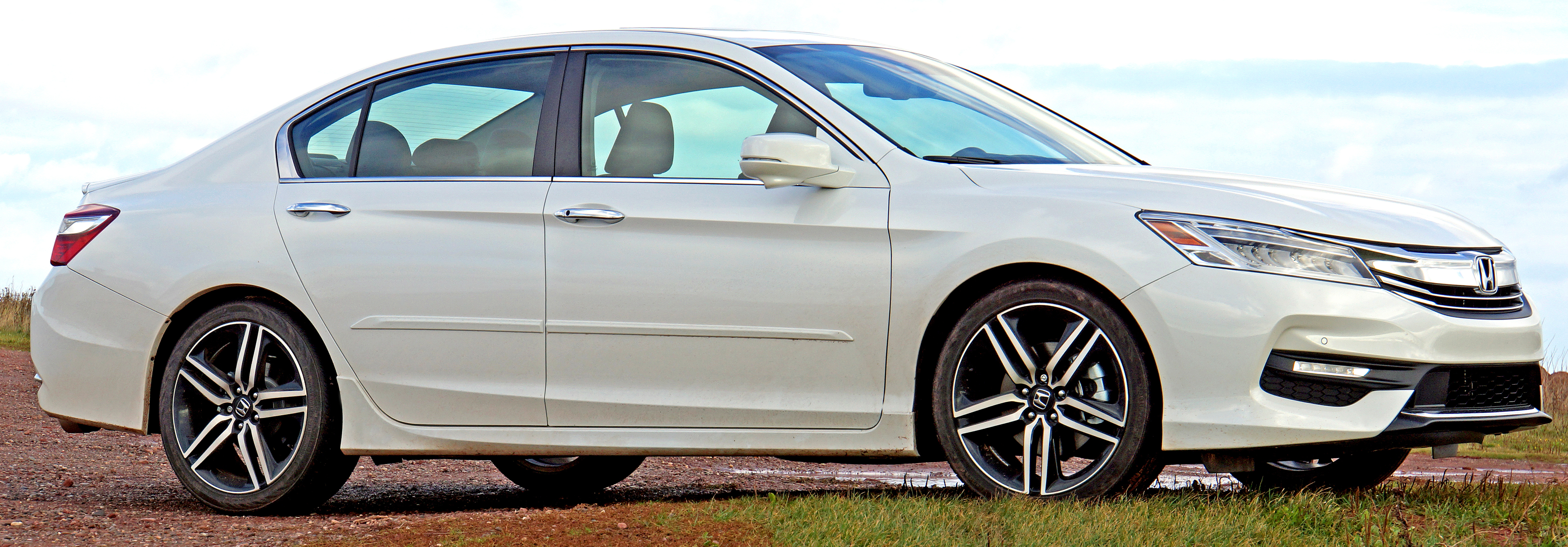
Accord Touring (US; facelift)

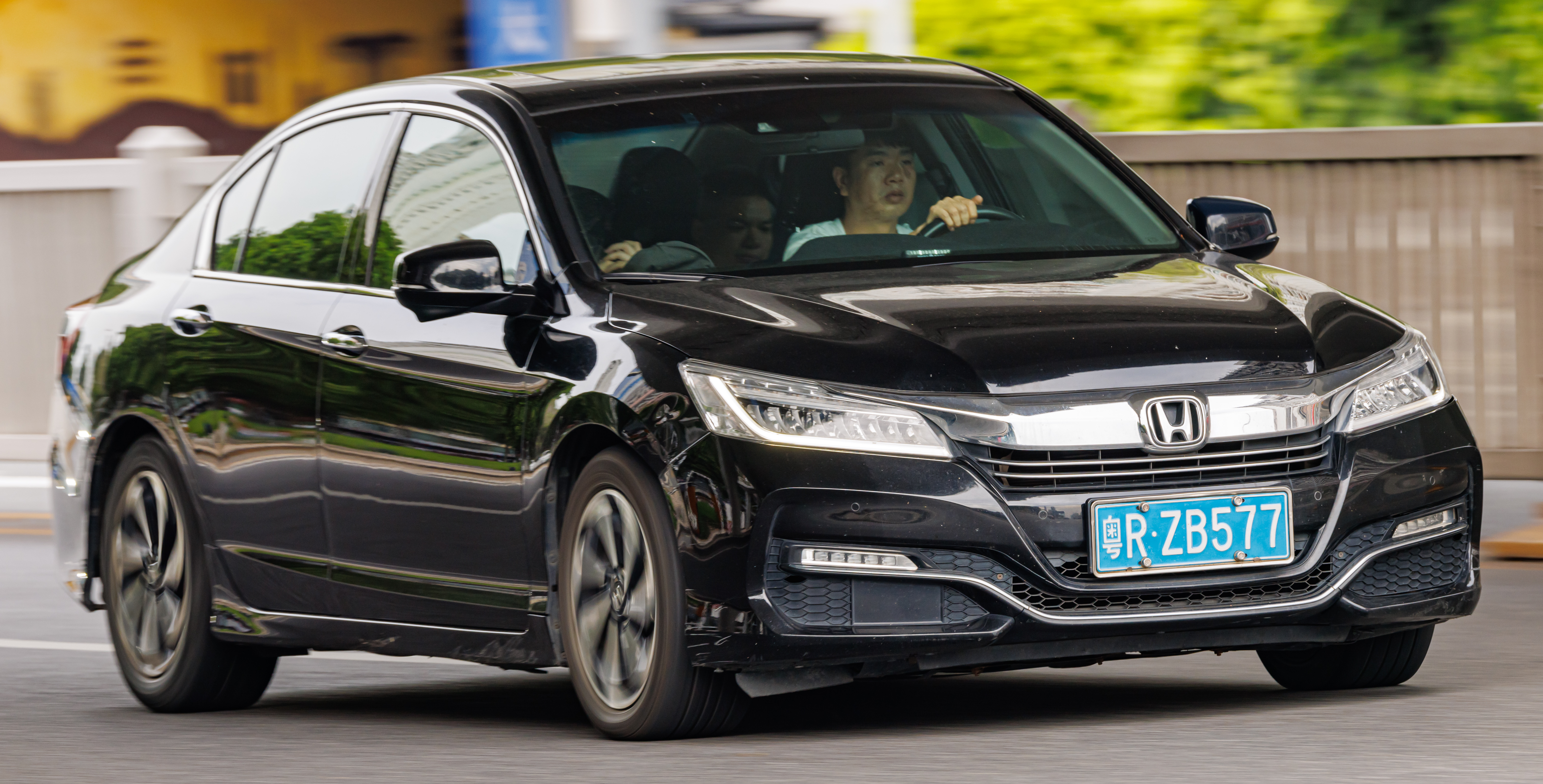
GAC-Honda Accord (China; facelift)

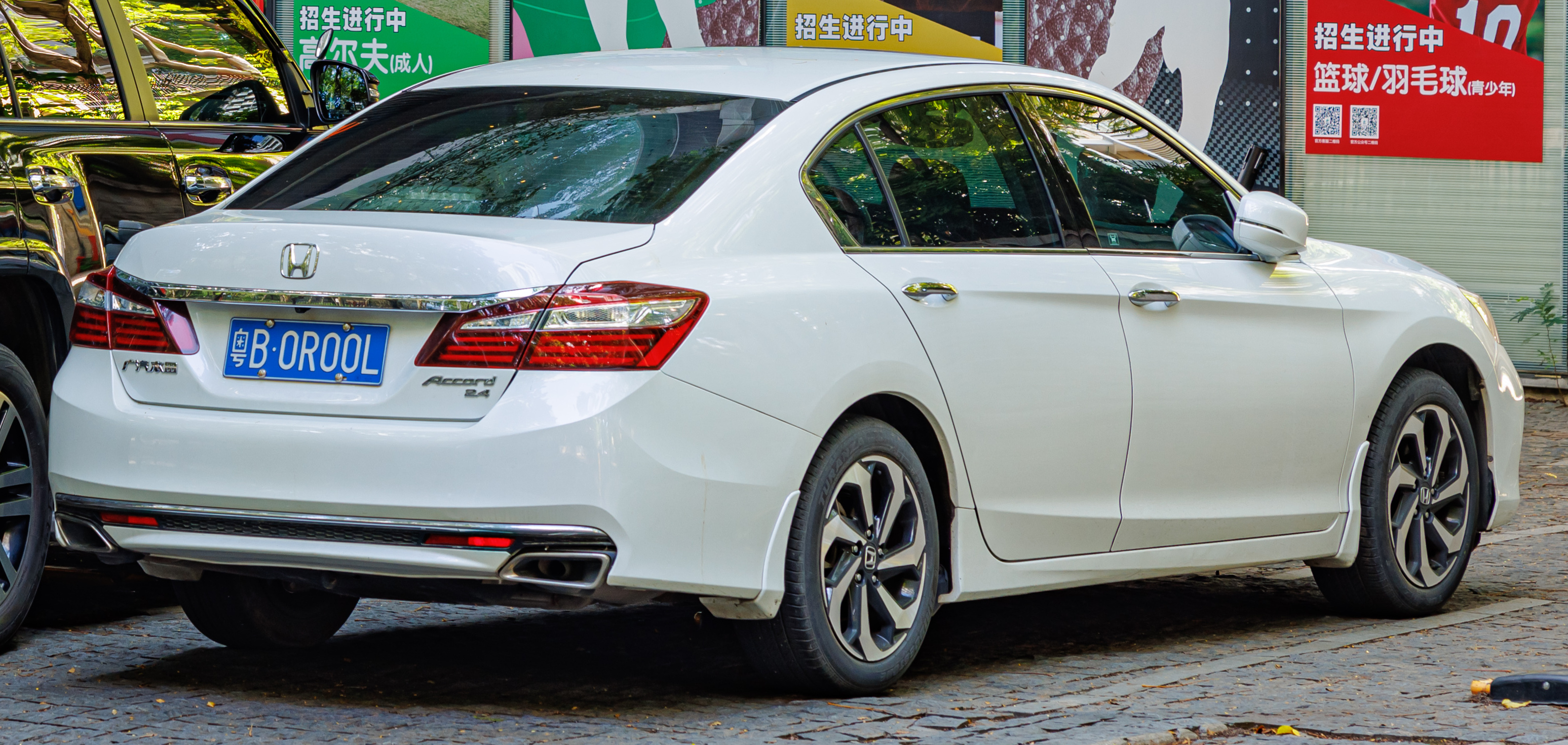
GAC-Honda Accord (China; facelift)

== Mechanical ==
The ninth-generation Accord offers the following powertrains: A new direct injected Earth Dreams 2.4-liter 16-valve DOHC four-cylinder engine rated at 185 hp (138 kW) to 181 lb⋅ft (245 N⋅m) of torque, upgraded to 189 hp (141 kW) to 182 lb⋅ft (247 N⋅m) in Sport trim, paired with either a six-speed manual or continuously variable transmission; an updated 3.5-liter 24-valve SOHC V6 mated either to a six-speed manual or automatic rated at 278 hp (207 kW) and 252 lb⋅ft (342 N⋅m); and a hybrid powertrain (named i-MMD) that integrates a 2.0-liter Atkinson Cycle gasoline engine with an electric motor and lithium-ion battery pack in North America. The hybrid system acts as an electric continuously variable transmission while in gasoline-electric hybrid mode, and is rated at 196 hp (146 kW) and 226 lb⋅ft (306 N⋅m). Both conventional and plug-in hybrid configurations are offered, both released in the U.S. market in the second half of 2013.

Honda has focused on economy, ride quality, responsiveness, and ride comfort with a completely redesigned front suspension. A simpler MacPherson strut design replaces the double wishbone front suspension in use since the second generation Accord. The rear suspension retains the independent multi-link suspension. The costlier design is now available only on the top-tier Acura RLX. The new front suspension helps shave weight and free up room in the engine compartment. In addition to the safety concerns of Honda's Advanced Compatibility Engineering, there is focus on body stiffness and dynamic handling response by improving structural rigidity around the front strut tower and lower control arm. All but the LX trim feature a strut bar. All trims receive upgraded shocks front and rear. The Touring trim now comes with more sophisticated double piston shocks called "Amplitude Reactive Dampers" that have been recently introduced on several Acura models.

The Accord's body now uses 55.8% high strength steel, a total of 17.2% are either of 780, 980 or 1,500 MPa yield strength types which were not used in the previous generation. The Accord's previous steel front subframe has been replaced with an aluminum and steel component that weighs 14 lb (6.4 kg) less and is manufactured using friction stir welding (hybrid models use an all-aluminum subframe and hood). Overall the body weight sheds 55 lb (25 kg).

In North America, the 2016 Accord now features front brake disc diameters from 11.1 in (LX only), 11.5 in, or 12.3 in (Sport / Touring), depending on model and trim, while the rear discs measure 11.1 inches in diameter.

=== Engines ===
Engine	Chassis code	Horsepower	Torque
2.0 L R20Z1 I4 petrol	CR1 (Sedan)	153 hp (114 kW) at 6,500 rpm	140 lb⋅ft (190 N⋅m) at 4,300 rpm
2.4 L K24W1 I4 petrol	CR2 (Sedan); CT1 (Coupe)	185 hp (138 kW) at 6,400 rpm	181 lb⋅ft (245 N⋅m) at 3,900 rpm
2.4 L K24W1 I4 petrol	CR2 (Sedan, Sport)	189 hp (141 kW) at 6,400 rpm	182 lb⋅ft (247 N⋅m) at 3,900 rpm
3.0 L J30A5 V6 petrol	CR4 (Sedan)	244 hp (182 kW) at 6,250 rpm	211 lb⋅ft (286 N⋅m) at 5,000 rpm
3.5 L J35Y1 – VCM V6 petrol	CR3 (Sedan); CT2 (Coupe, Automatic)	278 hp (207 kW) at 6,200 rpm	252 lb⋅ft (342 N⋅m) at 4,900 rpm
3.5 L J35Y2 V6 petrol	CT2 (Coupe, Manual)	278 hp (207 kW) at 6,200 rpm	252 lb⋅ft (342 N⋅m) at 5,300 rpm
2.0 L LFA1 / LFA-MF8 I4 hybrid petrol	CR6 (Hybrid); CR5 (Plug-in Hybrid)	Hybrid (Pre-facelift) / Plug-in Hybrid; 140 hp (100 kW) at 6,200 rpm (engine); 167 hp (125 kW) at 3,857-8,000 rpm (electric motor); 196 hp (146 kW) (combined) Hybrid (facelift); 143 hp (107 kW) at 6,200 rpm (engine); 181 hp (135 kW) at 5,000-6,000 rpm (electric motor); 212 hp (158 kW) (combined)	Hybrid (Pre-facelift) / Plug-in Hybrid; 122 lb⋅ft (165 N⋅m) at 4,500 rpm (engine); 226 lb⋅ft (306 N⋅m) at 0-3,857 rpm (electric motor) Hybrid (facelift); 129 lb⋅ft (175 N⋅m) at 3,500 rpm (engine); 232 lb⋅ft (315 N⋅m) at 0-2,000 rpm (electric motor)
2.0 L LFA-H4 I4 hybrid petrol	CR7 (Hybrid, JDM Facelift only)	143 hp (107 kW) at 6,200 rpm (engine); 181 hp (135 kW) at 5,000-6,000 rpm (electric motor); 212 hp (158 kW) (combined)	129 lb⋅ft (175 N⋅m) at 3,500 rpm (engine); 232 lb⋅ft (315 N⋅m) at 0-2,000 rpm (electric motor)

== Trim levels ==
Two additional trim levels are added in North American markets, Sport and Touring. The Accord Sport Sedan is slotted between the LX and EX models and features a 2.4-liter 16-valve DOHC inline-four engine rated at 189hp and 182 lb⋅ft (247 N⋅m) of torque, 18-inch wheels and wider tires, dual exhaust, a decklid spoiler, fog lights, leather-trimmed steering wheel and seats, exclusive carbon-fiber-style dash trim, and steering wheel mounted paddle shifters on models equipped with the continuously variable transmission. The V6 engine is no longer an option for non-leather trims. Starting from the 2016 model year, the Sport trim featured LED daytime running lights, upgraded LED fog lights, as well as the 19-inch alloy wheels, wider and lower profile (235/40 R19 96V) tires, and bigger front brake rotors found in the Accord Touring Sedan, the lineup's flagship. The Touring trim is available with either four-cylinder or V6 engines in Canada, whereas in the U.S. the V6 engine is standard on Touring models.

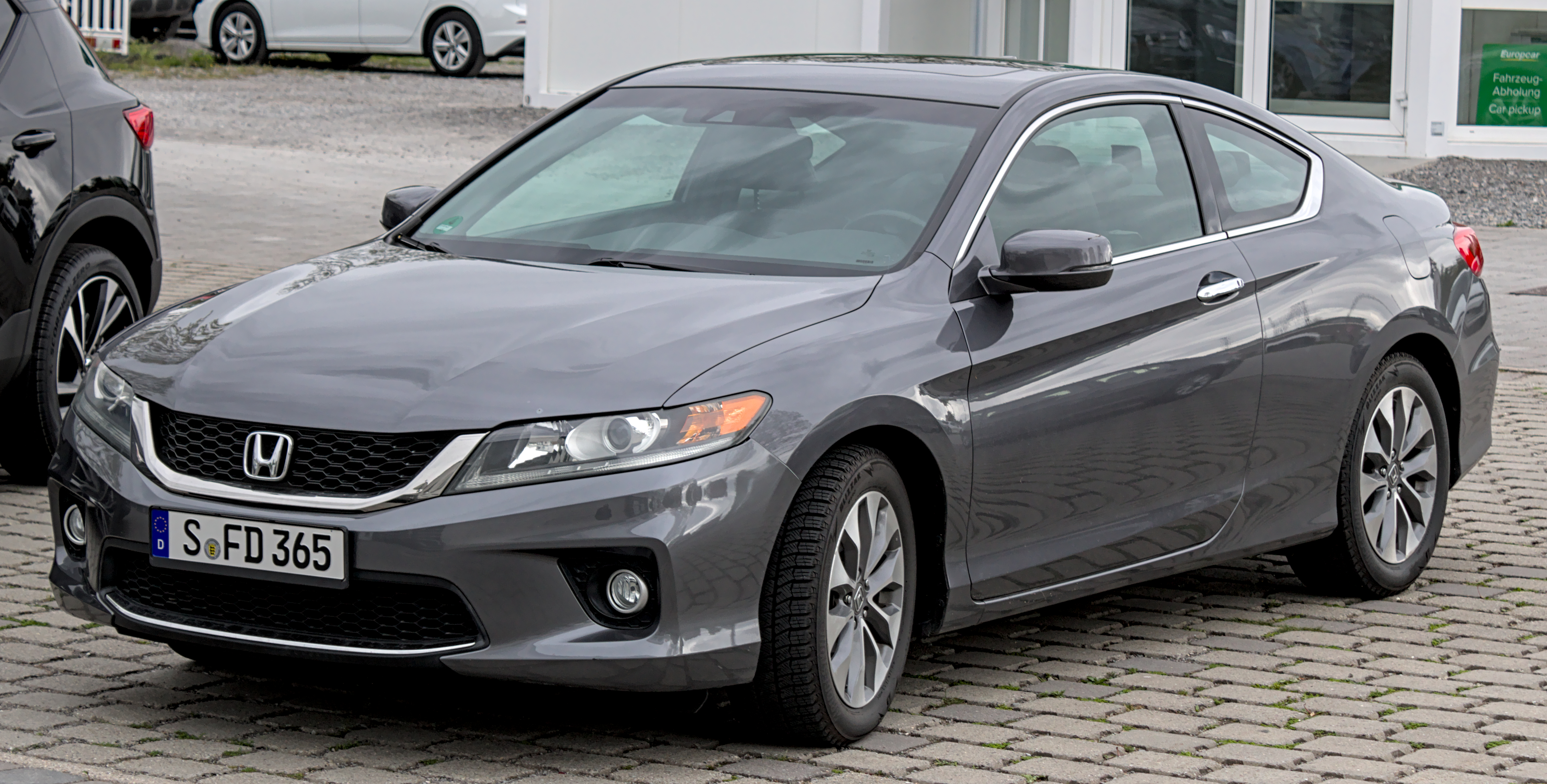
Accord Coupe (pre-facelift)

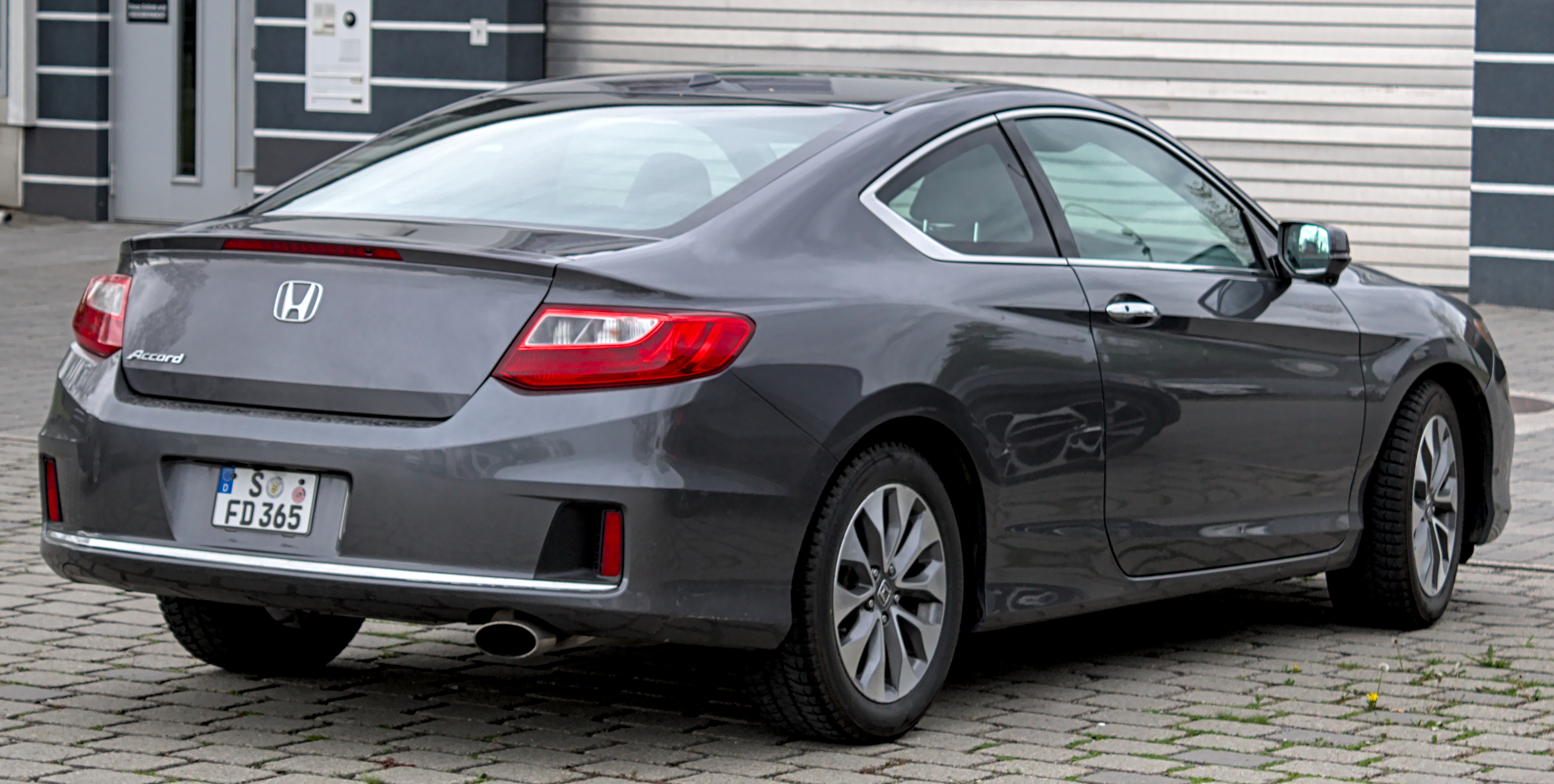
Accord Coupe (pre-facelift)

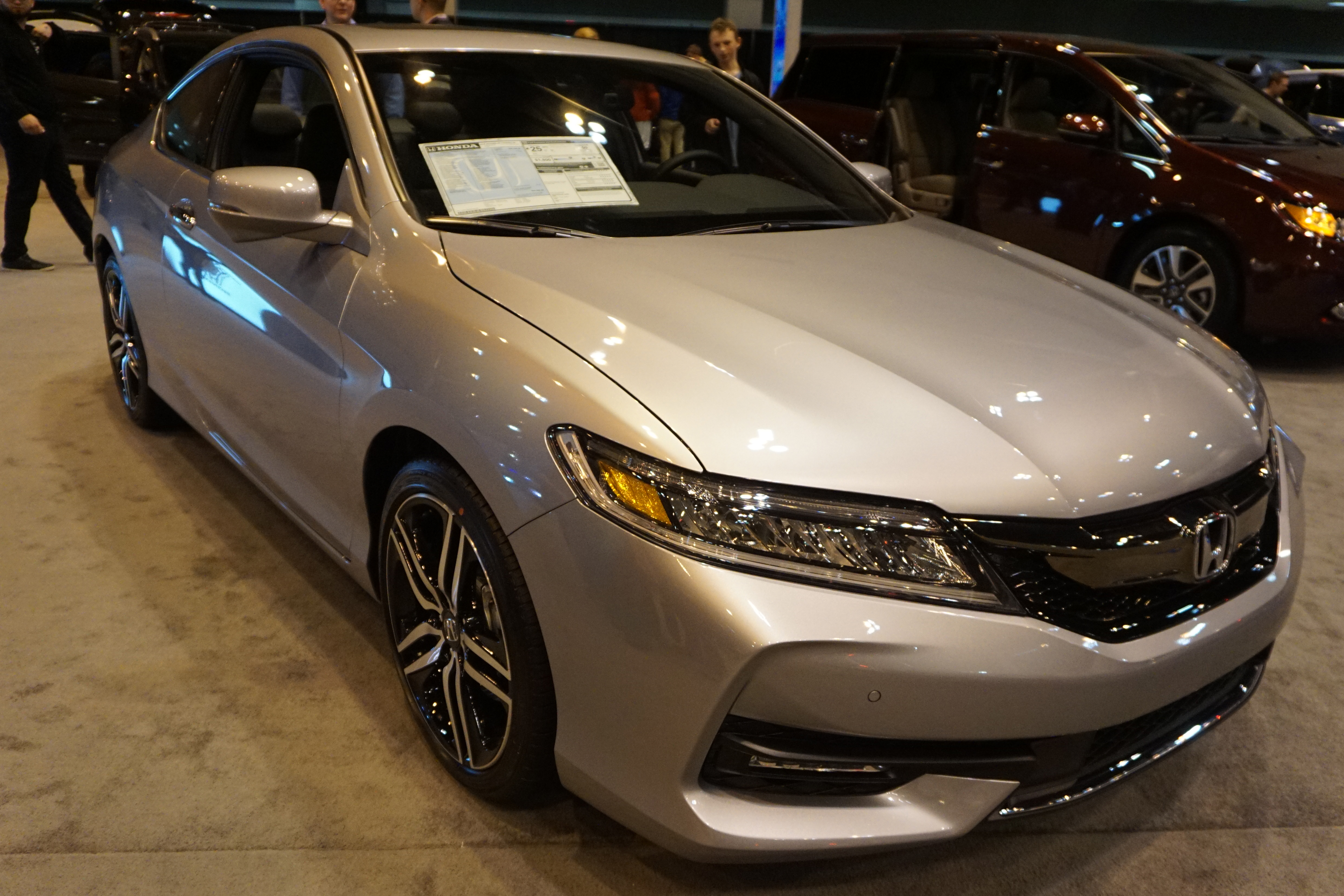
Accord Touring Coupe (US; facelift)

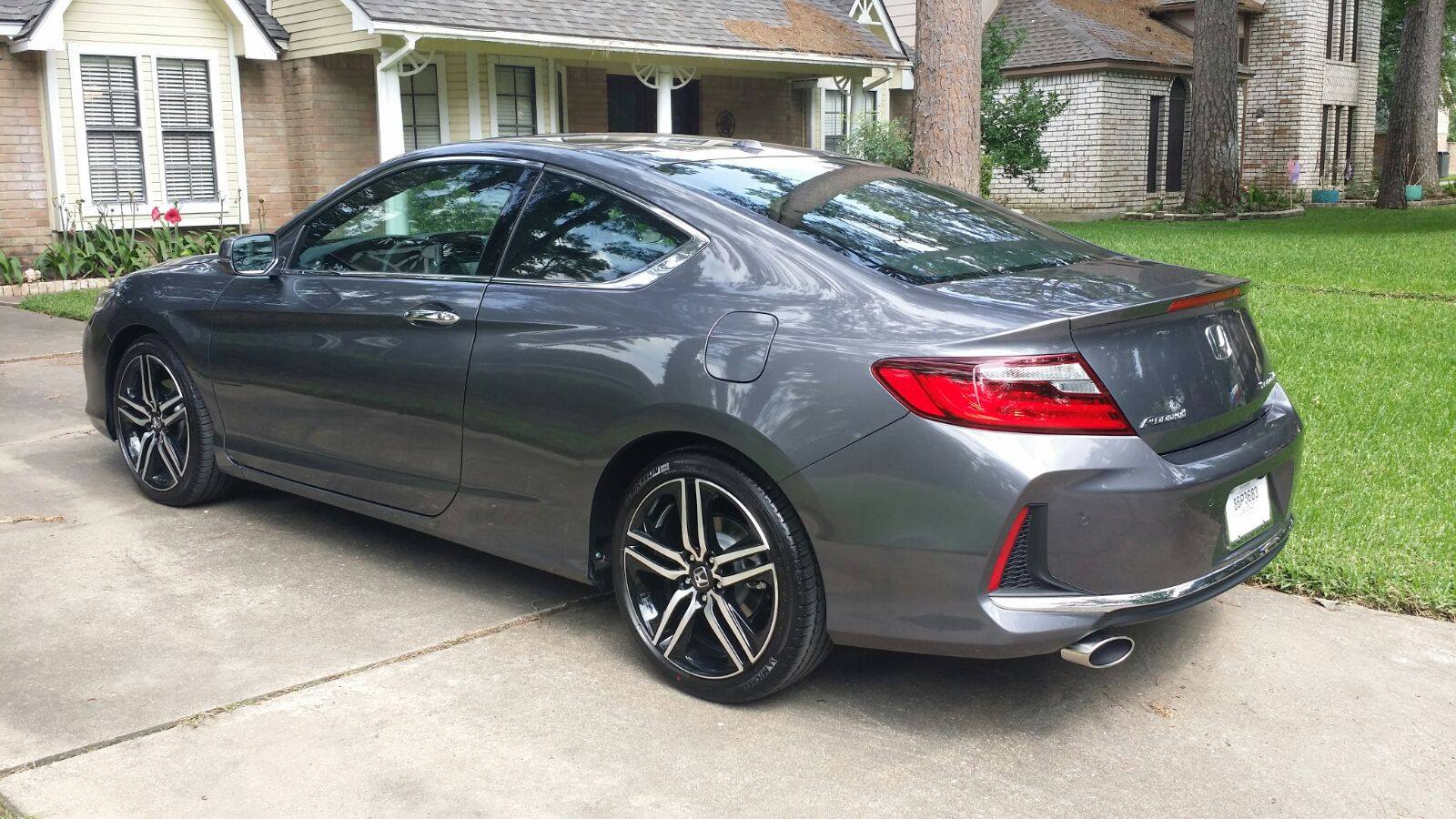
Accord Touring Coupe (US; facelift)

== Safety ==
=== ANCAP ===
ANCAP test results Honda Accord (2013)
Test	Score
Overall	4 /5 stars
Frontal offset	11.21/16
Side impact	16/16
Pole	Not Assessed
Seat belt reminders	2/3
Whiplash protection	Pending
Pedestrian protection	Adequate
Electronic stability control	Standard

ANCAP test results Honda Accord (2014)
Test	Score
Overall	5 /5 stars
Frontal offset	14.79/16
Side impact	16/16
Pole	2/2
Seat belt reminders	3/3
Whiplash protection	Good
Pedestrian protection	Adequate
Electronic stability control	Standard

=== Insurance Institute for Highway Safety (IIHS) ===
IIHS 2013 Accord sedan scores:
Moderate overlap frontal offset	Good
Small overlap frontal offset	Good
Side impact	Good
Roof strength	Good

IIHS Accord coupe scores
Moderate overlap frontal offset	Good
Small overlap frontal offset (2013–14)	Acceptable
Small overlap frontal offset (2015-17)	Good
Side impact	Good
Roof strength	Good

=== NHTSA ===
2013 Accord sedan NHTSA
Overall:	5/5 stars
Frontal Driver:	4/5 stars
Frontal Passenger:	4/5 stars
Side Driver:	5/5 stars
Side Passenger:	5/5 stars
Side Pole Driver:	5/5 stars
Rollover:	5/5 stars

2013 Accord coupe NHTSA
Overall:	5/5 stars
Frontal Driver:	5/5 stars
Frontal Passenger:	5/5 stars
Side Driver:	5/5 stars
Side Passenger:	5/5 stars
Side Pole Driver:	5/5 stars
Rollover:	5/5 stars
