= Lower tie bar =

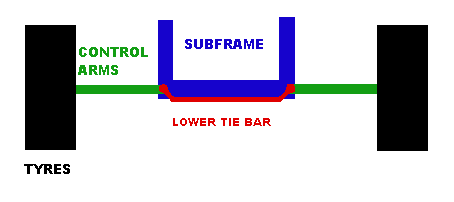
Diagram showing a lower tie bar

A lower tie bar is an alloy/steel bar that ties the lower suspension pick-up points of a vehicle (with an independent suspension) together. It increases chassis rigidity by bracing the left and right lower-control-arm sheet metal mounting points. The lower tie bar is designed to reduce the non-pivoting movement of the control arms and to stiffen the subframe to lessen the distortion of the lower suspension, especially during hard cornering. As a result, it improves the handling and steering response of the vehicle. It may also provide additional benefits in front-wheel drive vehicles by reducing wheel hop and torque steer. The bar may lower ground clearance by as much as 30 millimeters on some aftermarket installations.

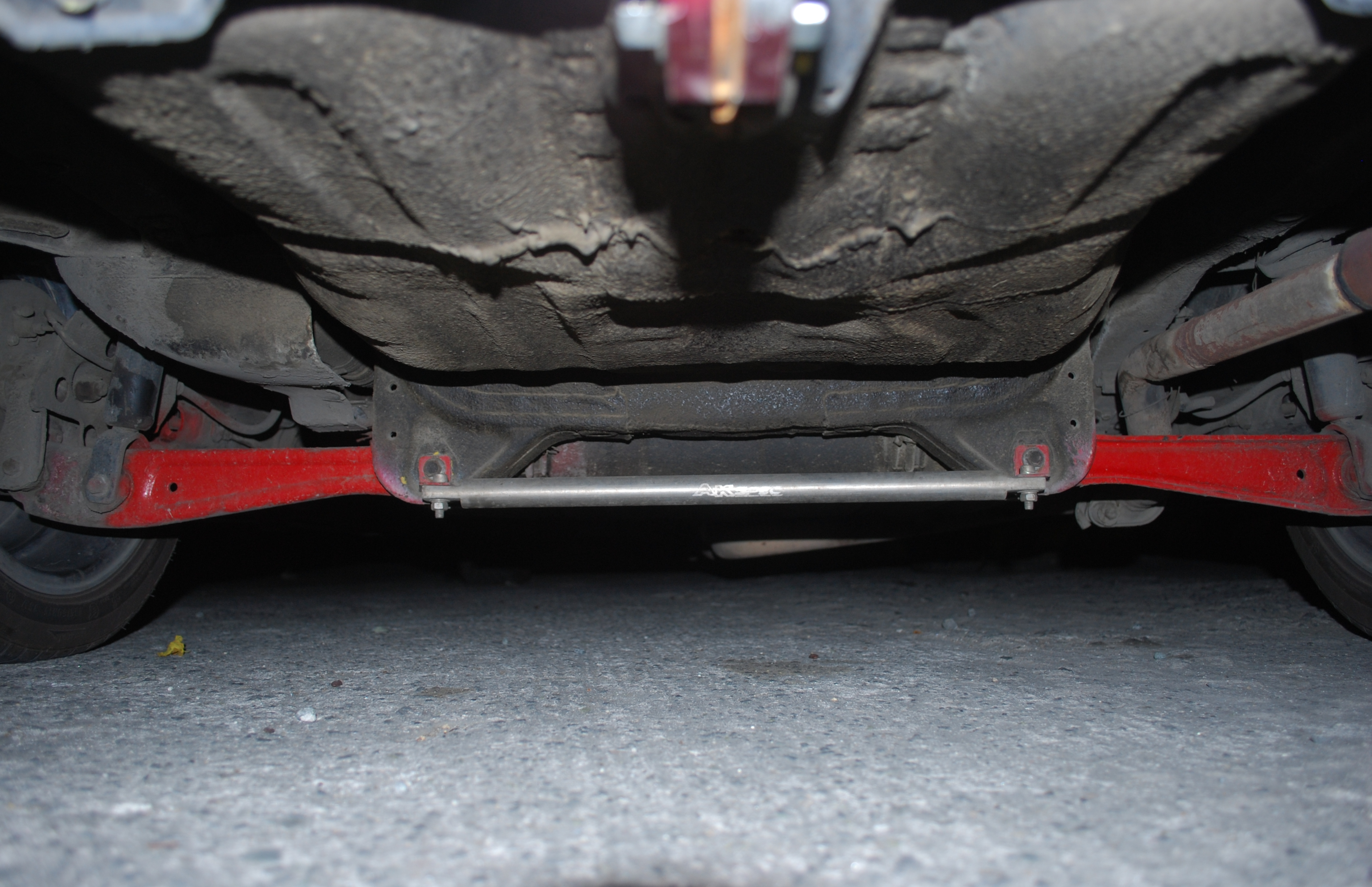
Lower tie bar (in stainless) attached to a rear subframe

The lower tie bar is mostly an aftermarket car component. Some of the few exceptions to this rule are the Honda Integra and Civic Type-R, as well as the Daihatsu Charade GTti. Since the lower tie bar is one of the cheapest upgrade that tuners can install on their cars, it is probably one of the first performance accessories is acquired. The lower tie bar is a bolt-on device and no stock parts will have to be replaced or removed when it is being installed on the vehicle (unless the vehicle already has one on it). These characteristics make the lower tie bar a popular performance upgrade among car tuning enthusiasts for its appearance and slight performance gain.

== See also ==
- Strut bar
