= Strut bar =

Automotive suspension accessory

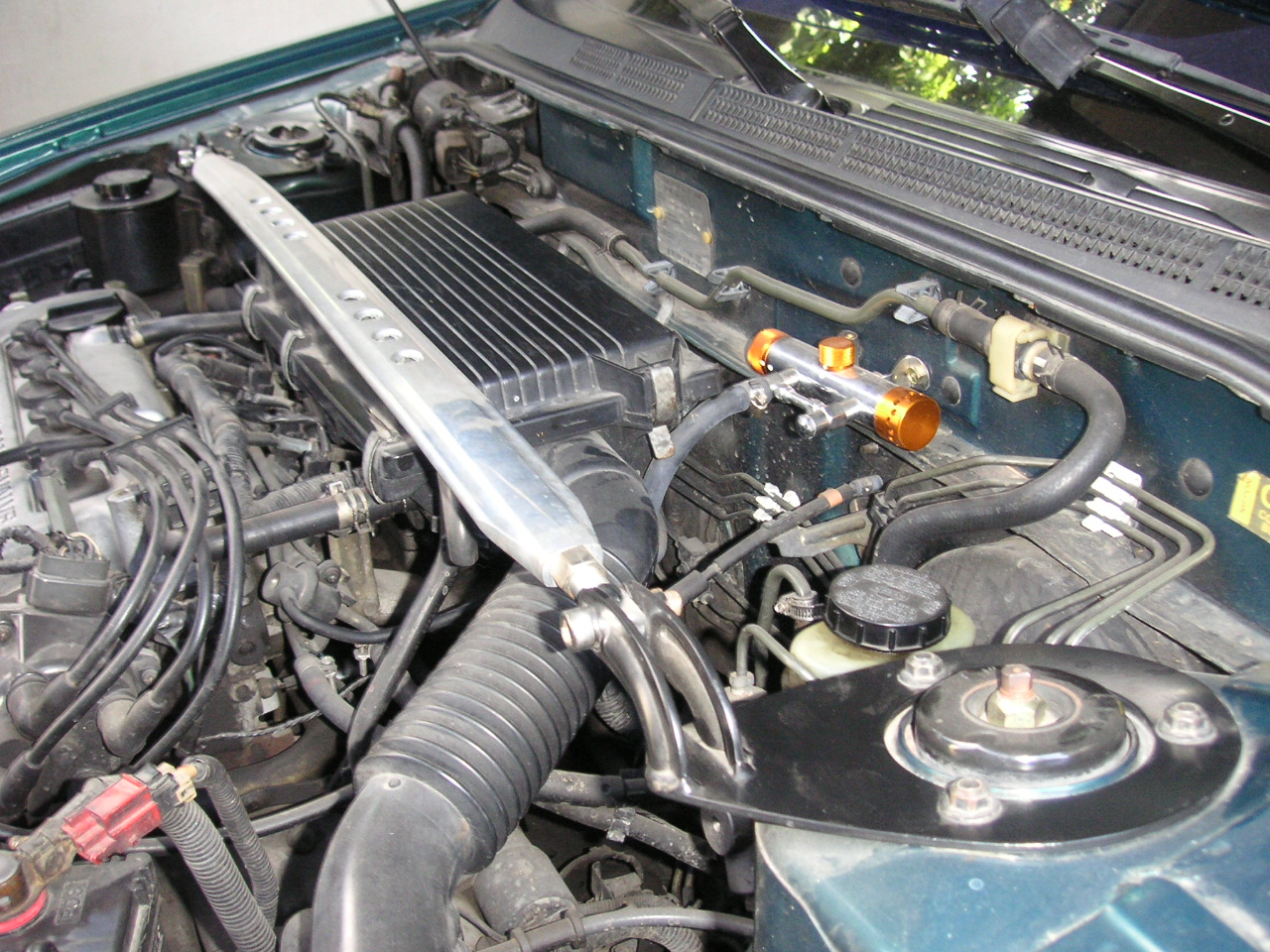
mounted strut bar

A strut bar, strut brace, or strut tower brace (STB) is an automotive suspension accessory on a monocoque or unibody chassis to provide extra stiffness between the strut towers.

With a MacPherson strut suspension system where the spring and shock absorber combine in one suspension unit, which also replaces the upper control arm, the entire vertical suspension load is transmitted to the top of the vehicle's strut tower. This is different from a double wishbone suspension where the spring and shock absorber may share the load separately. In general terms, a strut tower in a monocoque chassis is a reinforced portion of the inner wheel well and is not necessarily directly connected to the main chassis rails. For this reason, there is inherent flex within the strut towers relative to the chassis rails.

== Function ==
A strut bar is designed to reduce this strut tower flex by tying the two strut towers together. This transmits the load off each strut tower during cornering which ties the two towers together and reduces chassis flex. The transmission of load provides an increase in steering control accuracy going into a corner, reducing the possibility of the vehicle sliding or losing traction. To accomplish this effectively (especially on MacPherson strut suspensions), the bar must be rigid throughout its length. Many manufacturers have fitted strut braces to performance models as standard or optional equipment.

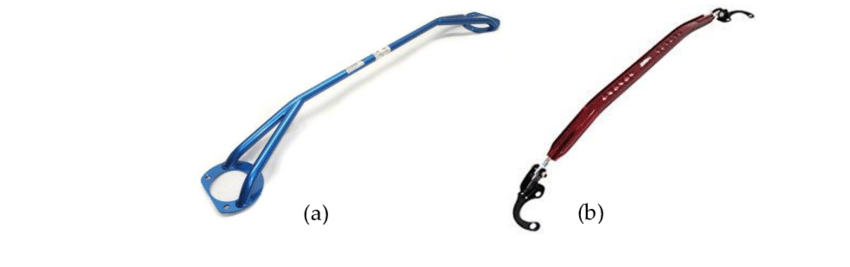
(a) Single-piece and (b) hinged type strut bar

=== Types ===
Most strut bars follow one of two design types. These designs include:

- A single-piece strut bar (most common)
- A hinged type strut bar

A single-piece strut bar is typically more durable and provides more rigidity as compared to the hinged type strut. However, the hinged type strut can allow for easier fitment of engine components due to its ability to move or pivot.

=== Benefits ===
Beyond reducing chassis flex and increasing steering control accuracy in a corner, other benefits of strut bars include:

- Increasing driving stability on a straight road
- Reducing car body deformation on low-quality roads
- Increasing stability under high loads and aggressive driving
- Protecting passengers from the engine being pushed into the cabin from a head-on collision
- Extending vehicle operation life
- Reducing body roll

=== Disadvantages ===
Some manufacturers have avoided the use of a strut bar due to a drawback in having the strut towers connected. The force from a significant impact or collision to one side of a vehicle would be distributed across the two struts leading to possible damages on both sides of the vehicle. This results in a higher repair cost.

Although a strut bar is useful for improving the handling of a vehicle, in motorsports applications, the added weight from a traditional steel or aluminum strut bar can come as a disadvantage. To offset this issue, alternative materials for strut bars are being researched with carbon fiber being the main focus, as it can provide more strength in relation to its overall weight compared to most materials.

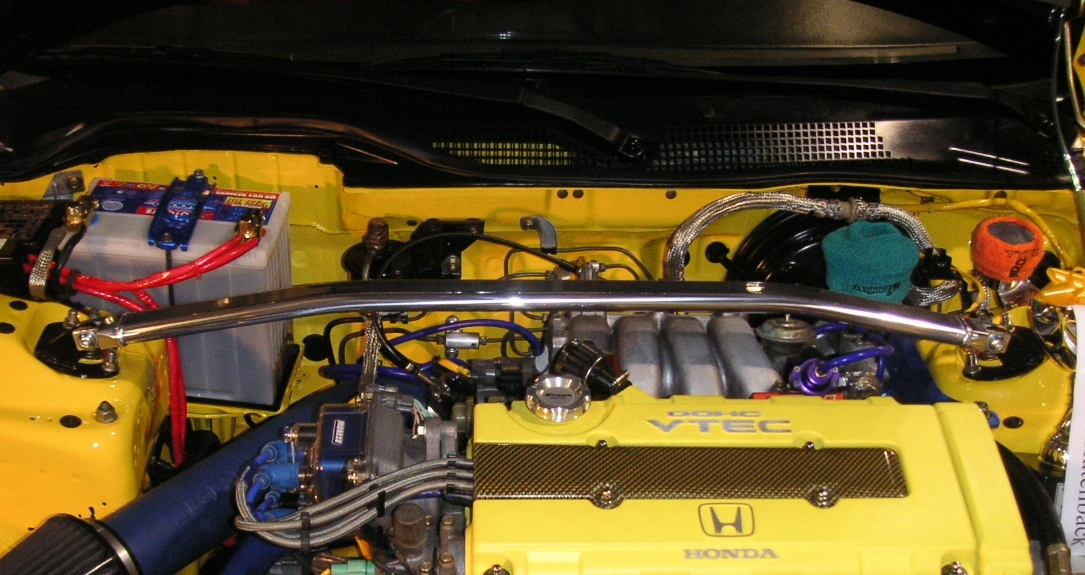
Front strut bar

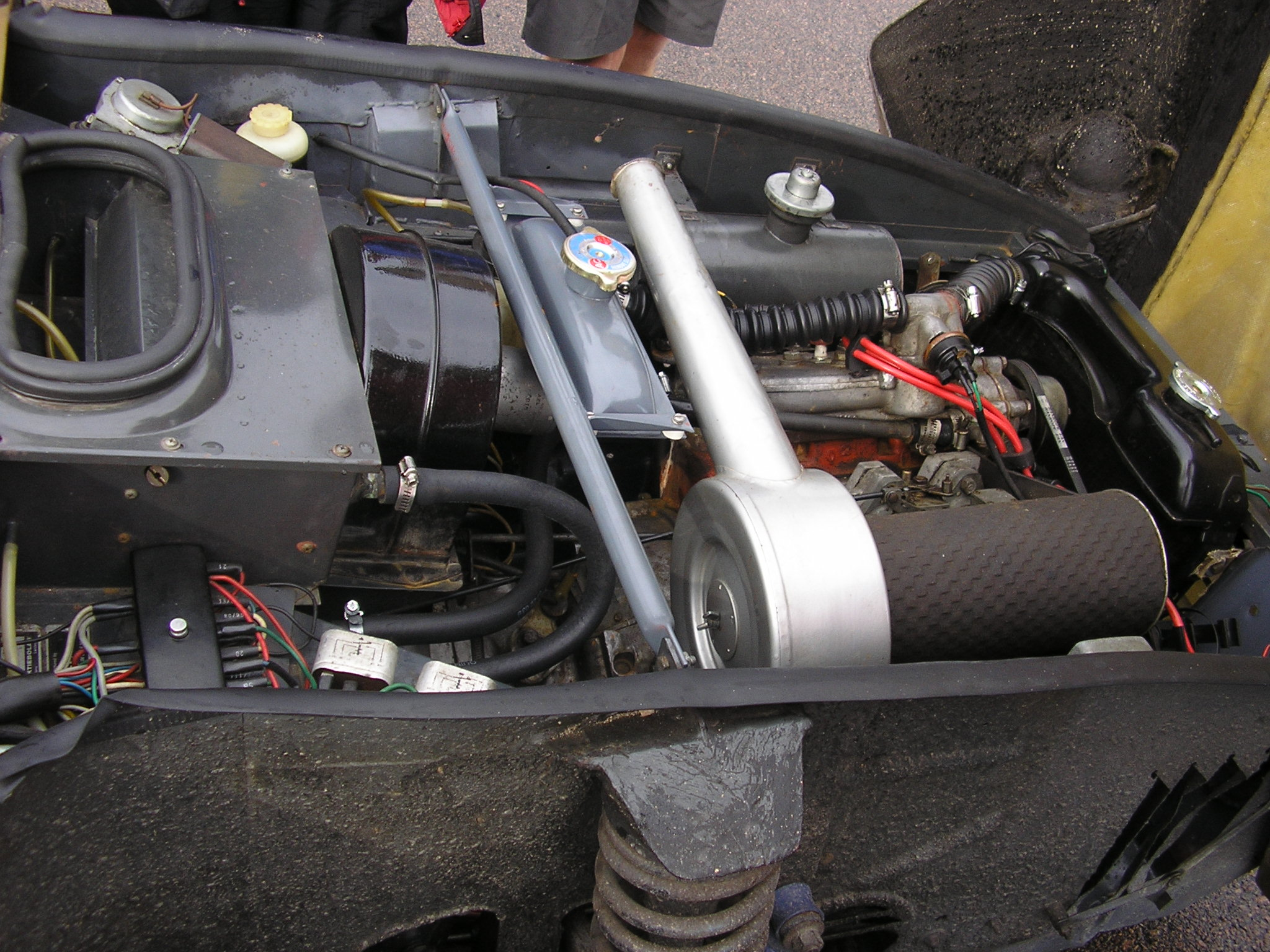
The strut bar also serves as mounting bracket for the overflow container of the mk2 Saab Sonett.

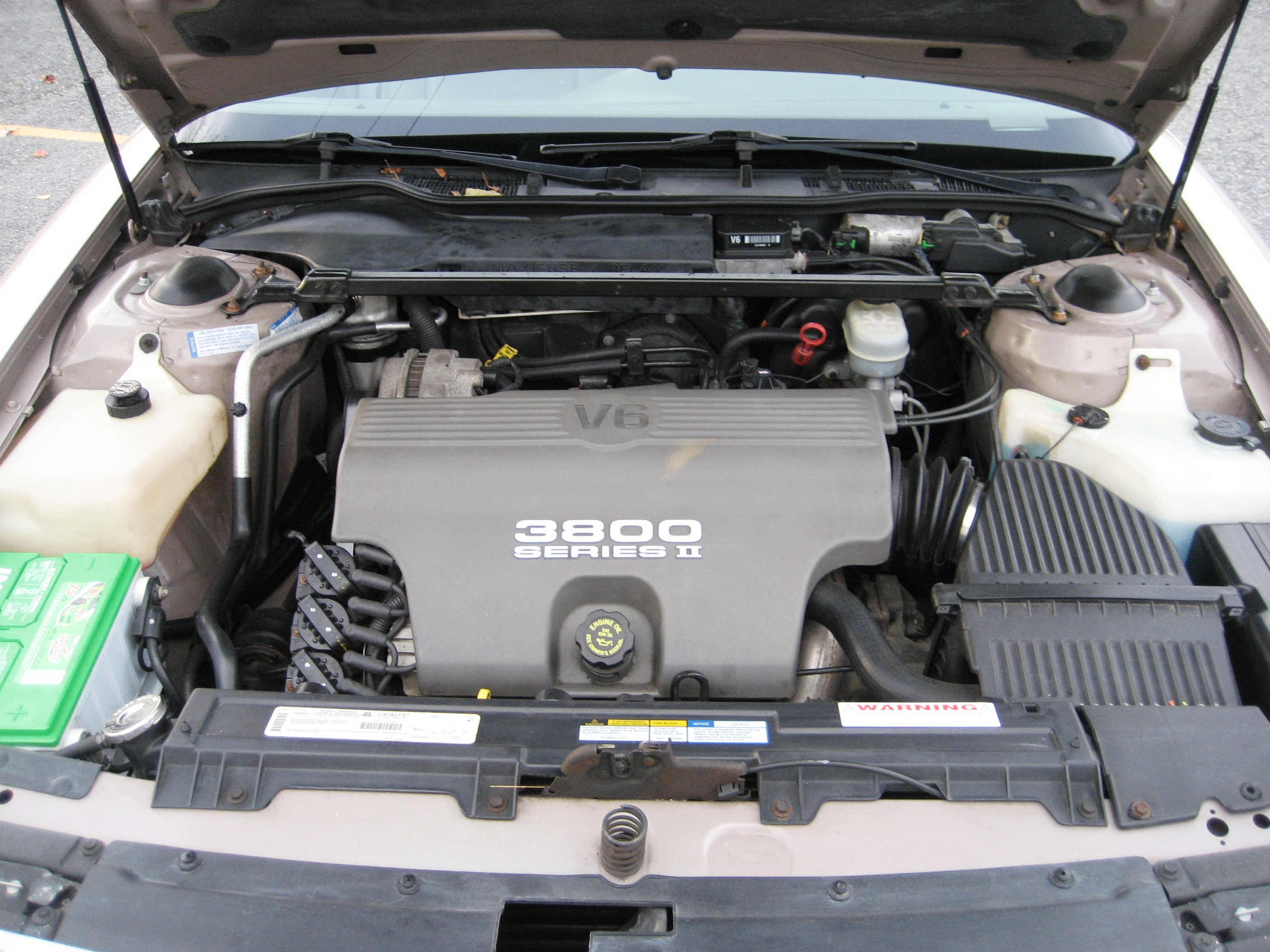
Oldsmobile Regency (H-Body) Factory STB

== See also ==
- Lower tie bar
