= Honda Ridgeline (first generation) =

First generation of Honda Ridgeline

Honda Ridgeline (YK1)
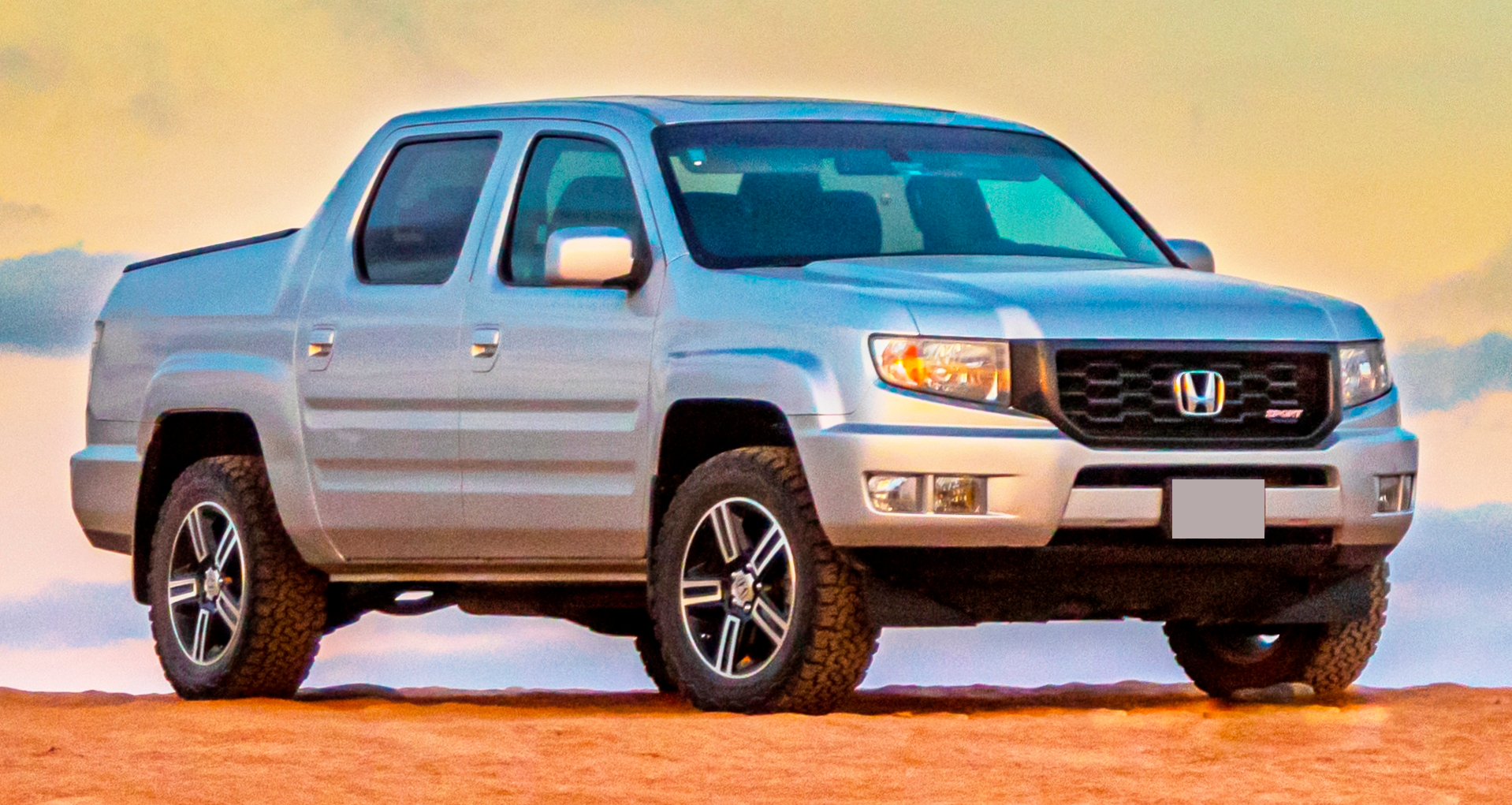
- 2012 Honda Ridgeline RTL (Mexico)

Overview
- Manufacturer: Honda
- Model code: YK1
- Production: Late 2004 – early 2015
- Model years: 2006–2014
- Assembly: Canada: Alliston (HCM, 2004–2009); United States: Lincoln, Alabama (HMA, 2008–2015)

Body and chassis
- Class: Mid-size pickup truck
- Body style: 4-door pickup
- Layout: Front-engine, four-wheel drive

Powertrain
- Engine: 3.5 L J35A9 V6 producing 247 hp (184 kW) and 245 lb⋅ft (332 N⋅m) (2006–2008); 3.5 L J35Z5 V6 producing 250 hp (190 kW) and 247 lb⋅ft (335 N⋅m) (2009–2014)
- Transmission: H5 BJFA 5–speed automatic (2006–2008); H5 PSFA 5–speed automatic (2009–2014)

Dimensions
- Wheelbase: 122 in (3,099 mm)
- Length: 2006–2008: 206.8 in (5,253 mm); 2009–2011: 207 in (5,258 mm); 2012–2014: 206.9 in (5,255 mm)
- Width: 77.8 in (1,976 mm)
- Height: 70.3 in (1,786 mm); 2012–2014 RTL: 71.2 in (1,808 mm)
- Curb weight: 2006–2008: 4,491–4,552 lb (2,037–2,065 kg); 2009–2011: 4,504–4,564 lb (2,043–2,070 kg); 2012–2014: 4,491–4,575 lb (2,037–2,075 kg)

Chronology
- Successor: Honda Ridgeline (second generation)

The first generation Honda Ridgeline is a mid-size pickup truck that was sold by Honda from early 2005 (marketed as a 2006 model year) through early 2015, mainly for the North American market. According to automotive journalists, the first generation Ridgeline has some noteworthy design features not found in its competition, including:

- Dual-action tailgate
- An in-bed trunk
- A half-ton (~500 kg) capacity composite bed
- An all-wheel drive system
- A fully independent suspension
- A large cabin for its class

According to Honda, the Ridgeline was not designed to steal sales from the more traditional trucks sold in North America, but was developed to "give the 18% of Honda owners who also own pickups a chance to make their garages a Honda-only parking area." According to the author of Driving Honda, the Ridgeline was one of Honda's more profitable vehicles despite its poor sales, with reported sales in over 20 countries.

== Design and specifications ==
From concept to production

Honda's Sport Utility Truck Concept (2004)

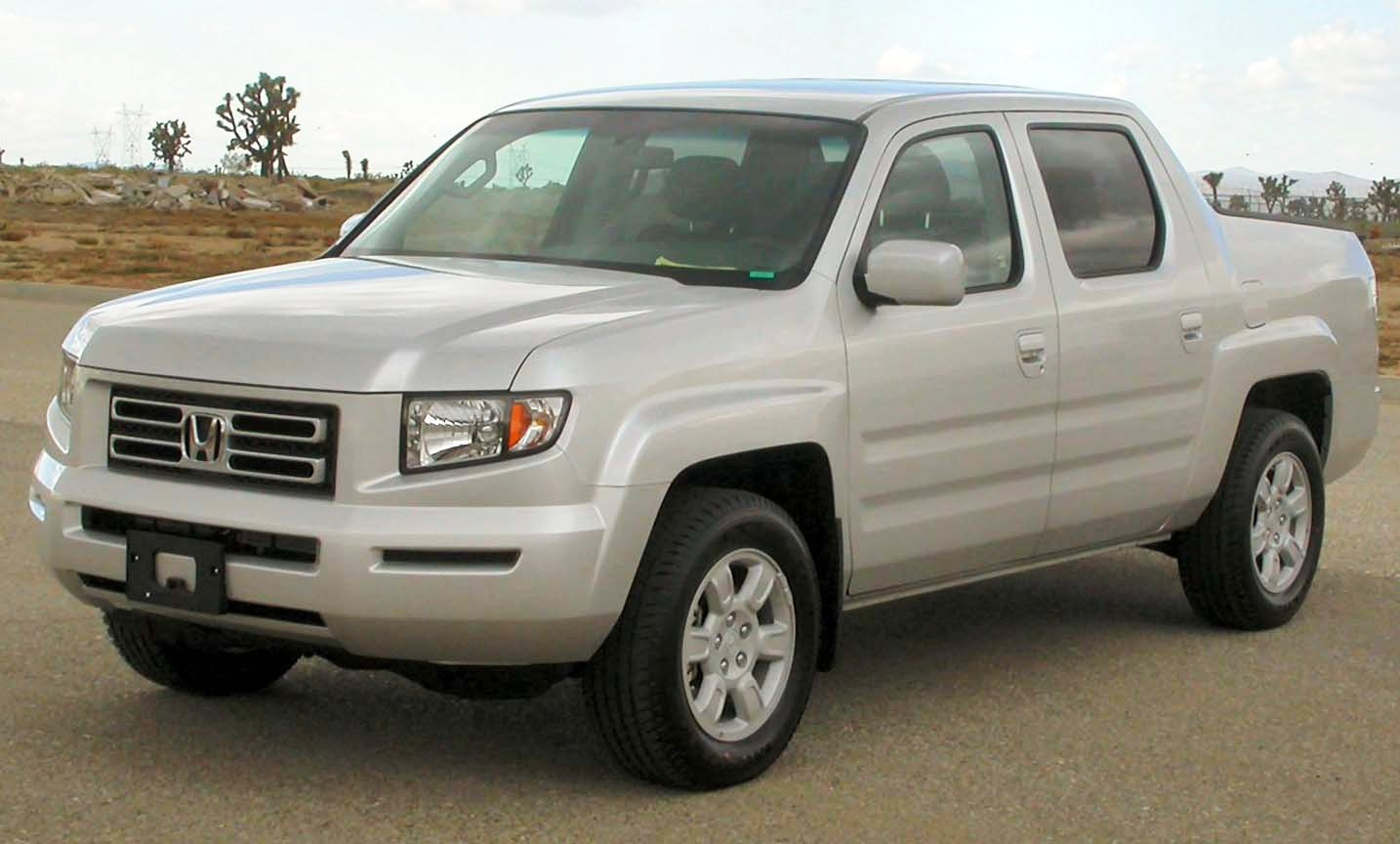
2006 Honda Ridgeline RTS

According to the author of The Car Design Yearbook, the Ridgeline was "Honda's first foray into the true heartland of the American automotive way of life—the pickup truck." It was designed and engineered by a 37-member engineering team from Honda Research and Development (R&D) Americas, led by Gary Flint. According to the author of Driving Honda, the automaker wanted to target buyers who were looking to transition out of sedans, minivans, and sport utility vehicles (SUV) into pickups. In 2001, the engineering team began experimenting with their first development mule, an extended version of a first generation Acura MDX with a competitor's pickup bed integrated into the rear structure, which they called "the Hondarado." After four years of development, the final design was revealed to the public as Honda's Sport Utility Truck Concept at the 2004 North American International Auto Show. Later that same year, Honda unveiled a revised version of their pickup concept at the Specialty Equipment Market Association (SEMA) Show and announced the official name of the vehicle, the Ridgeline. The production version of the Ridgeline was unveiled the following year at the 2005 North American International Auto Show.

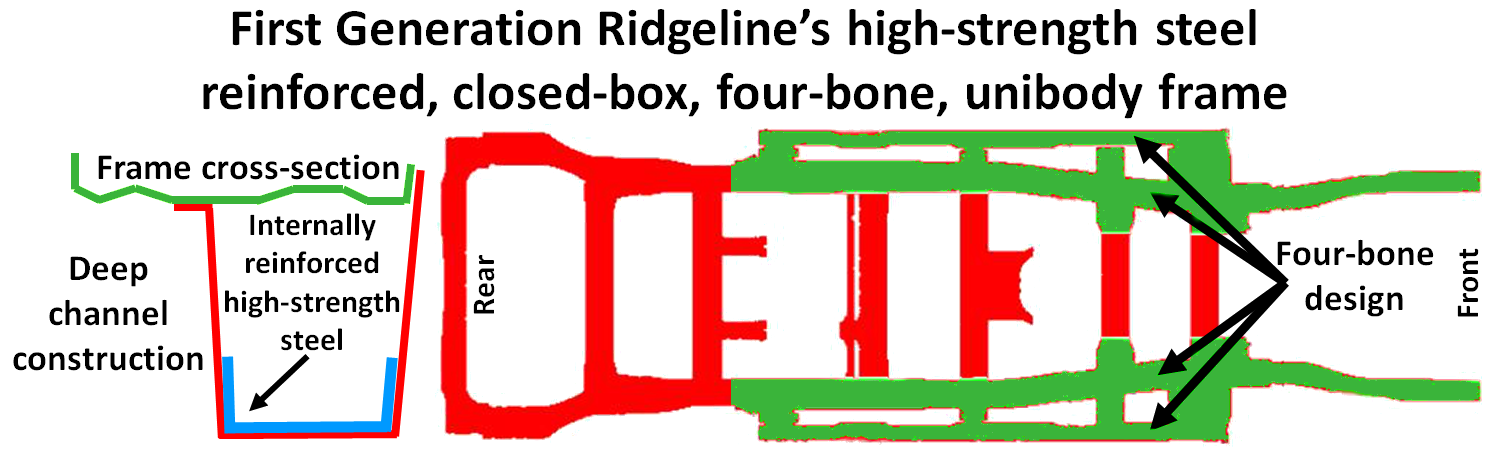

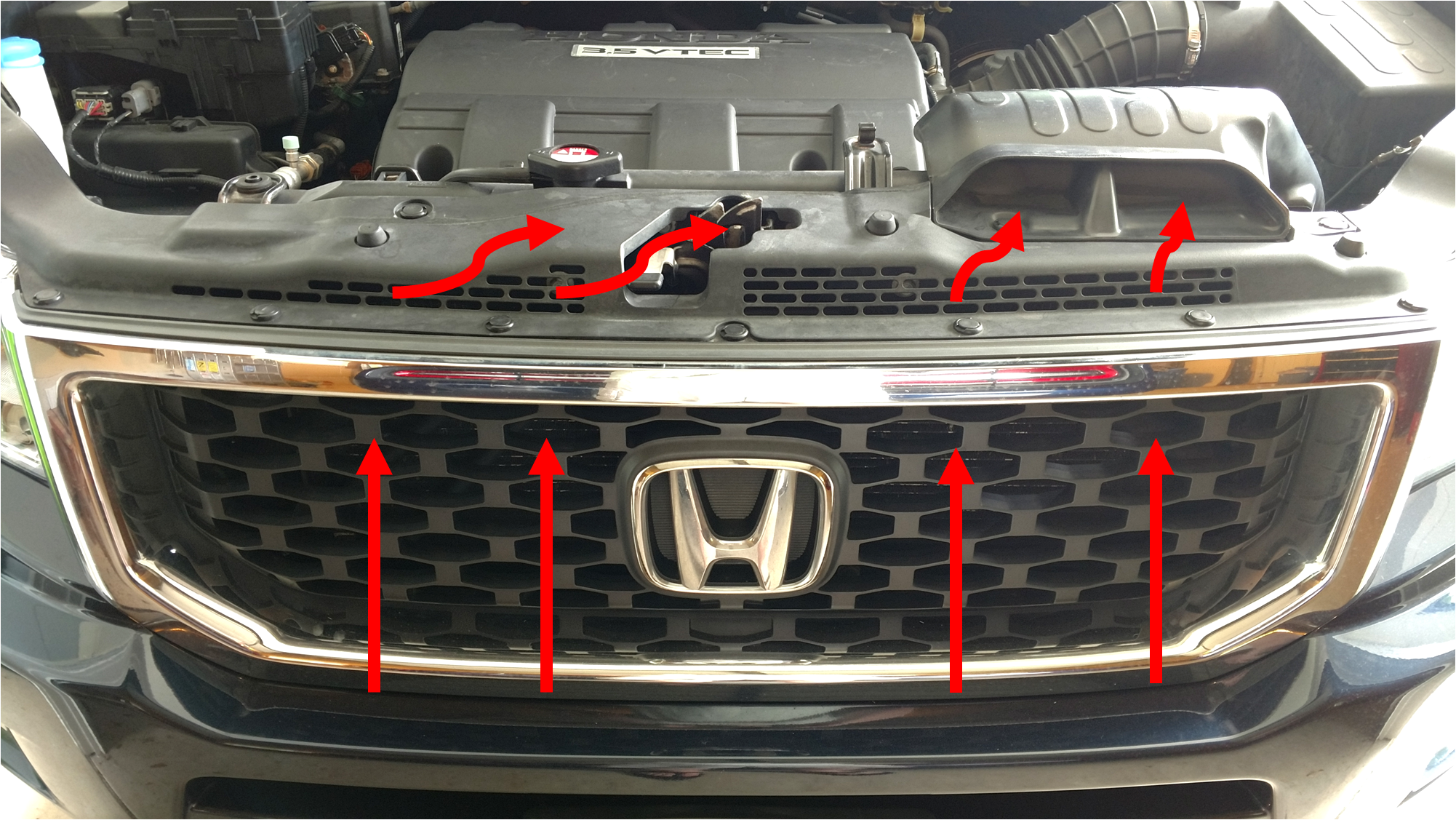
Illustration of how fresh air enters forward of the radiator and is directed to the airbox.

According to Honda, construction of the Ridgeline starts with a fully boxed "four bone" "ladder-like frame" using 44% high-strength steel and seven high-strength steel crossmembers. This was coupled to "a unique suspension design with custom components," sheetmetal not shared with any other Honda product, and a 95% unique interior. The ladder-like frame, powertrain configuration, and four-wheel independent suspension provided space for designers to build storage solutions in, around, and on top of the frame. Starting at the front of the Ridgeline, engineers stamped a steel hood that supports a cold air intake system for the engine that draws outside air from above and in front of the radiator to support torque production as well as water fording. This hood design also shields the windshield wipers from the environment which are also heated to improve winter performance. Honda also constructed large side-view mirrors to support better visibility while towing; due to their size, Honda incorporated small vortex generators on top of the mirrors to reduce air turbulence. In the crew-cab, the unibody frame allowed for the construction of a cabin with 112 cu ft (3,171 L) of passenger volume and a flat floor (i.e. no transmission hump). At the center of the truck, the C-pillar's buttress was specifically designed to help distribute large loads across the unibody frame and the cab so the truck could achieve its targeted payload and towing figures. Also, the C-pillar, rear roof section, and tailgate were designed to maintain good aerodynamics and reduce turbulence in the bed while maintaining driver visibility. This design helps shield the rear glass window so when it's opened at speed there is less buffeting or rainwater intrusion. The bed is built out of steel-reinforced sheet moulding composite (SMC)—developed by Continental Structural Plastics—which is dent resistant, corrosion resistant, ultraviolet light resistant, has a non-slip coating, and reduces weight by 30% over traditional sheet-metal. The SMC bed is supported by high-strength steel crossmembers (three under the bed and two in the rear cab wall) to safely secure and support heavy loads, even under conditions that would cause the SMC to fail or during collisions that would try to force a load into the cab.

=== Specifications ===
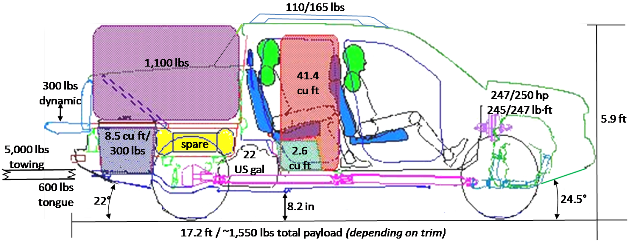

First generation Ridgeline bed layout (2014 RTL)

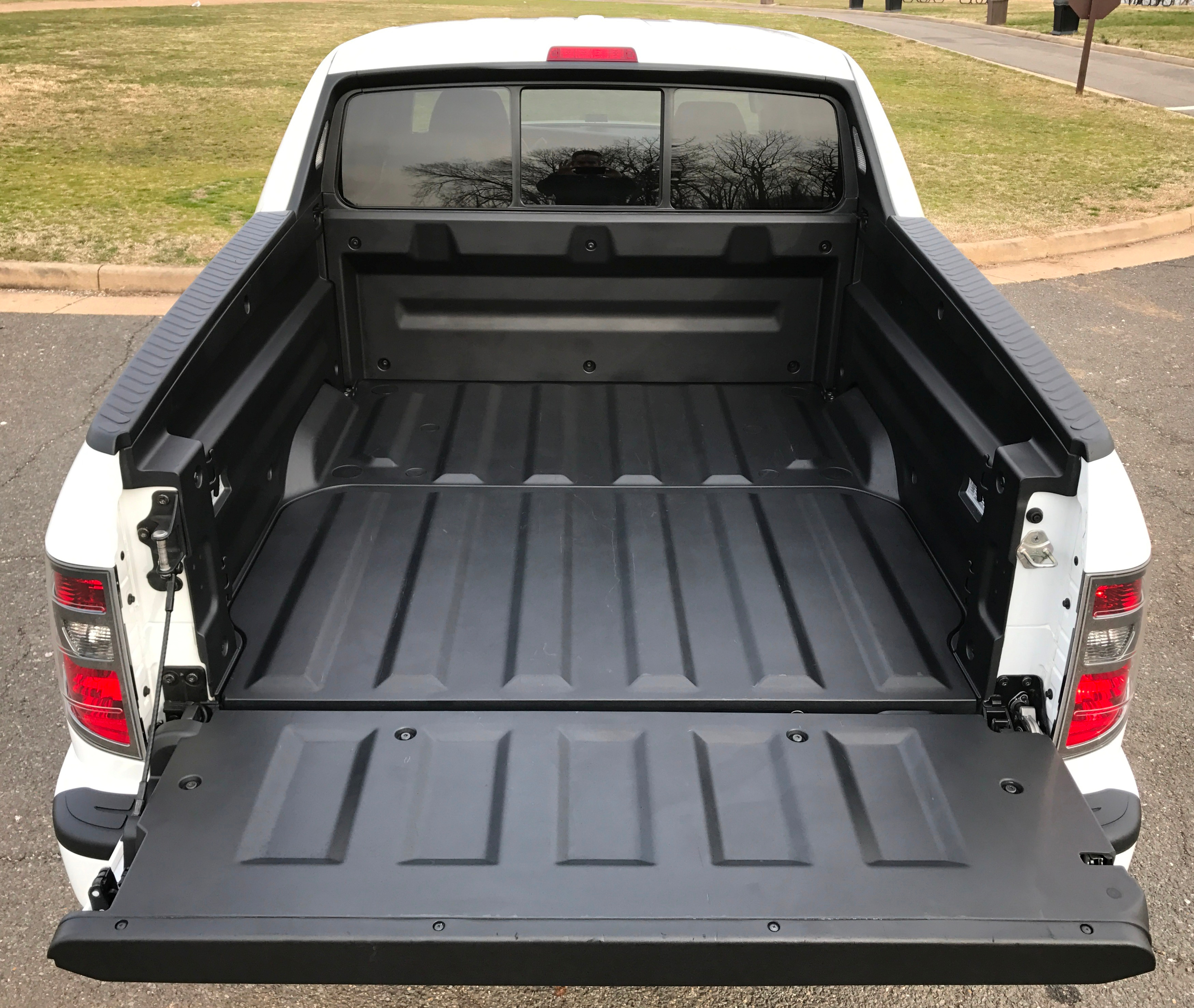
Bed with tailgate down

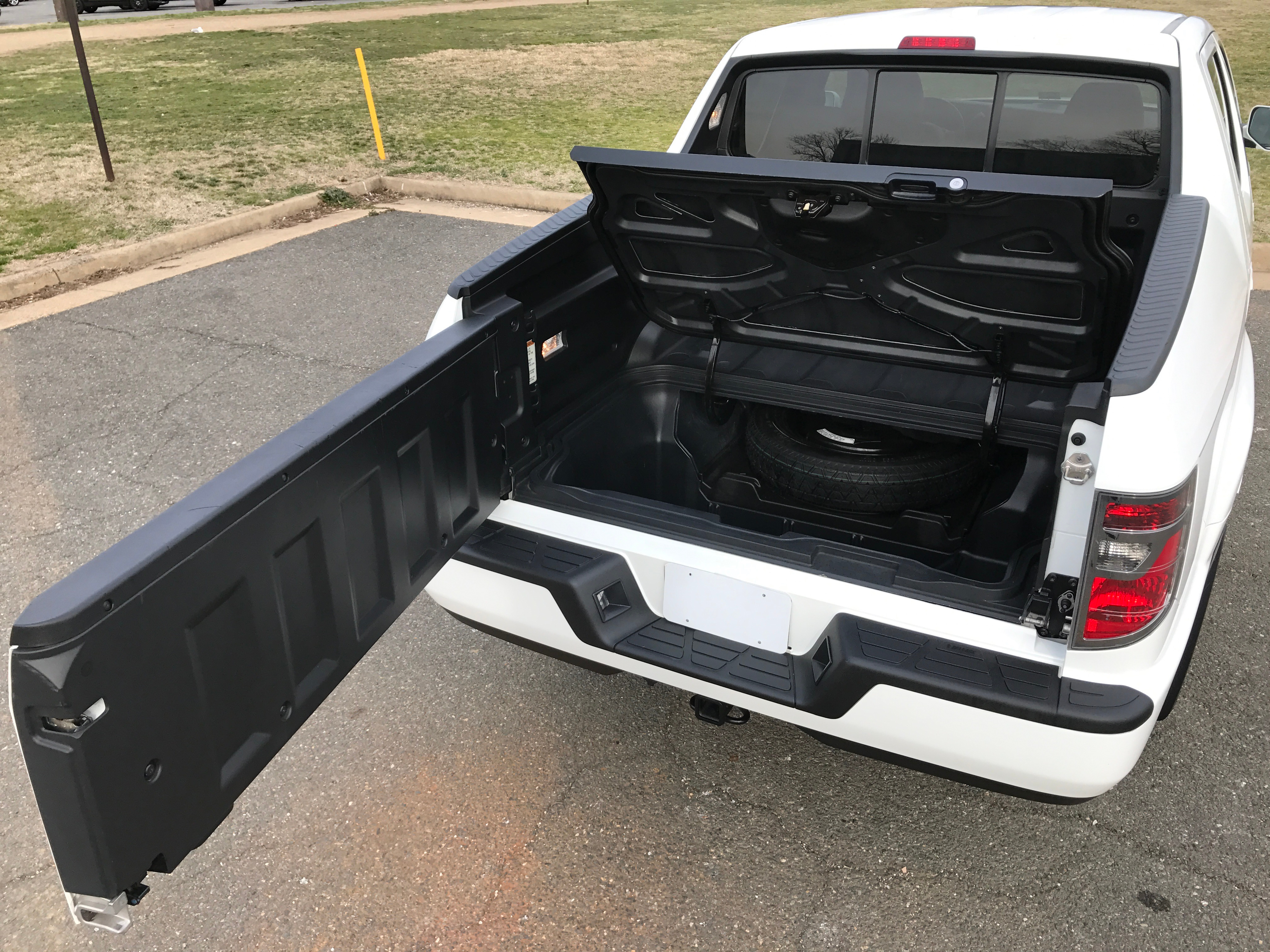
Bed with tailgate swung open 80° and In-Bed Trunk open

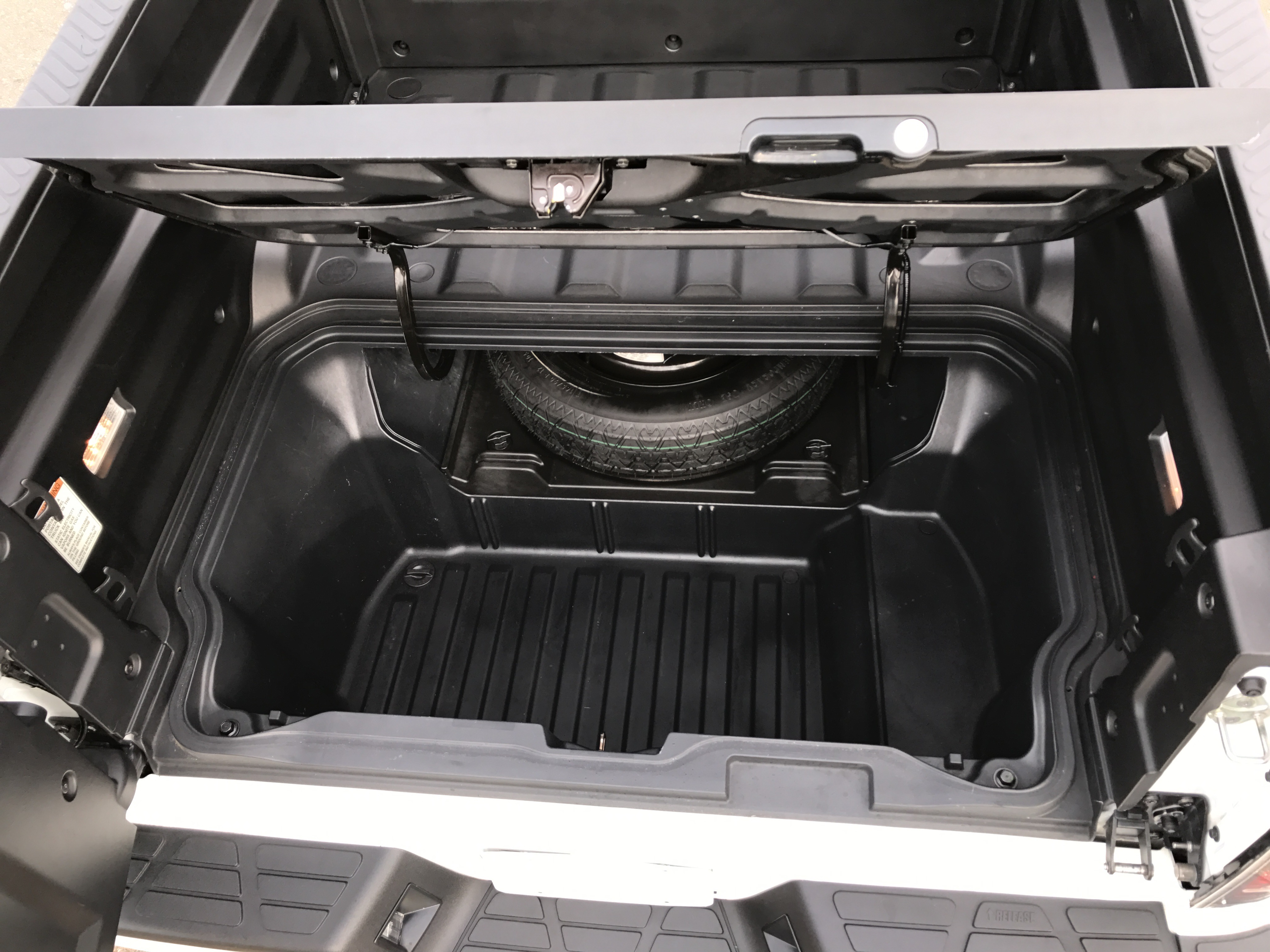
In–Bed Trunk and spare tire service tray with temporary spare

The first generation Ridgeline has a 5 ft (1.5 m) cargo bed which can be extended to 6.6 ft (2 m) with the tailgate down. The bed's width between the wheel-wells is 4.1 ft (1.2 m) and 4.6 ft (1.4 m) at its widest points. It includes the "industry's first" lockable, watertight, and drainable 8.5 cu ft (240.7 L) in-bed trunk at the rear of the bed. The cabin can accommodate five adults with 2.6 cu ft (73.6 L) of under-seat storage in the second row or 41.4 cu ft (1.2 m^{3}) when the rear 60/40 split bench seat's bottom cushions are folded up. It has 8.2 in (20.8 cm) of ground clearance with approach, departure, and breakover angles of 24.5º, 22º, and 21º respectively.

The first generation Ridgeline has a weight distribution of 58/42 (front/rear) with a total payload capacity ranging from 1,475 lb (669 kg) to 1,559 lb (707 kg), depending on trim level, with a gross vehicle weight rating (GVWR) of 6,050 lb (2,744 kg) and a gross combined weight rating (GCWR) of 10,085 lb (4,574 kg). The steel-reinforced SMC bed is designed to handle loads of up to 1,100 lb (499 kg) and has six (2006–2008 models) or eight (2009–2014 models) tie down cleats in a high/low configuration rated at 350 lb (159 kg) each. The Ridgeline's bed is also equipped with four bed lights—one integrated into each C-pillar and one in each side-panel at the rear of the bed—that is designed to provide a minimum of ten lux of illuminance throughout the bed. According to Honda, the bed's dimensions, equipment placement, and indentations—what Honda calls guides—were designed with the hauling of off-road motorcycles or all-terrain vehicles in mind. Additionally, the forward section of the passenger-side bed wall has a hidden auxiliary tire mount that can accommodate a compact or full-size spare tire for times when access to the spare tire service tray, via the in-bed trunk, is impractical. Inside the in-bed trunk are integrated cargo hooks and organizer slots to help manage up to 300 lb (136 kg) of material. The tailgate has a dual-action hinging system that allows it to be laid-down in the traditional manner or be swung open either 30º or 80º to the side. When laid-down, the tailgate's asymmetrical cantilevered design can support dynamic loads of up to 300 lb (136 kg). When equipped with a roof rack, the roof is designed to handle loads of 110 lb (50 kg) to 165 lb (75 kg), depending on model year.

Honda lists a 5,000 lb (2,268 kg) towing capacity for the Ridgeline while accommodating a 600 lb (272 kg) tongue weight and an additional 330 lb (150 kg) for people and gear. All models were equipped with Honda's dual-mode 130 ampere (A) alternator, were pre-wired for an electric trailer brake controller, and a seven-pin capable trailer wiring harness. Also, depending on trim level and model year, a class III tow hitch with a four-pin flat and seven-pin blade or just a seven-pin blade trailer connection was either standard equipment or dealer installed options.

The first generation Ridgeline has a four-wheel independent suspension using upright springs and dampers with MacPherson struts in front and a multi-link trailing arm with twin-tube gas filled hydraulic shocks in the rear providing 7.3 in (18.5 cm) front and 8.2 in (20.8 cm) rear of total wheel travel. It has a turning radius of 42.6 ft (13.0 m) using an 18.5 : 1 variable power-assisted rack-and-pinion steering. The Ridgeline has a traditional hydraulic braking system with four-wheel disc brakes using 12.6 in (32 cm) ventilated front discs with floating twin piston calipers and 13.1 in (33.3 cm) solid rear discs with floating single piston calipers and a "drum-in-hat" integrated emergency/parking brake. The disc brakes are controlled via a four-channel anti-lock braking system with electronic brakeforce distribution and emergency brake assist.

=== Powertrain ===
The first generation Ridgeline is powered by Honda's J-series engines, which consisted of transverse mounted 3,471 cc (212 cu in) 24-valve 60º V6 engines with VTEC and belt-driven SOHC. The engines consist of an aluminum block with thin-walled cast iron liners and exhaust manifolds that are cast directly into the aluminum cylinder heads. The engines also have 10 : 1 compression, an aluminum variable-length intake manifold and PGM-FI.

All first generation Ridgelines came equipped with a heavy-duty radiator, auxiliary transmission and power steering coolers, and dual 160 watt (W) radiator fans to support hauling and towing duties. The Ridgeline also came equipped with a variable torque management four-wheel drive (VTM-4) system—co-developed with BorgWarner—that provides front-wheel drive for dry-pavement cruising and engages all-wheel drive to improve acceleration, stability, maneuverability, and off-road performance. The VTM-4's electromagnetically driven clutch-operated differential can transfer up to 70% of available torque to the rear-axle when needed. The VTM-4 system can also be electronically locked providing maximum torque to the rear wheels for better handling of adverse terrain or to assist the driver in becoming unstuck. Additionally, the first generation Ridgeline came equipment with a four-channel electronic stability control system—what Honda calls Vehicle Stability Assist (VSA)—that is designed to enhance control during acceleration, cornering, and collision-avoidance maneuvers and can be manually disabled to prevent undesirable throttle intervention in off-road conditions.

All these components work together to respond to the Ridgeline's electronic throttle that is also linked to the VTM-4 and VSA systems. Honda's five–speed automatic transmission—also known as an automated manual transmission—used in the Ridgeline has a four–shaft, vs the traditional three, design with a flat three–stage torque converter and lock–up clutch that is managed by the PFM–FI's central processing unit. A direct-control real–time pressure management system coordinates engine and transmission operation to minimize driveline shocks and a grade logic controller prevents gear hunting when ascending hills or when more engine braking is required.

The first generation Ridgeline was built with a 22 US gal (83 L) fuel tank and is designed to run on unleaded gasoline with a minimum of 86 octane (2006 model year) or 87 octane (all other model years). However, when towing over 3,500 lb (1,588 kg), 91 octane unleaded gasoline is recommended. A powertrain control module and a block-mounted acoustic knock sensor work together to either retard or advance ignition timing to maximize engine performance with various octane gasolines.

Natural Resources Canada (NRCan) and US Environmental Protection Agency (EPA) fuel economy ratings for the first generation Ridgeline
Categories	Model Years			
Categories	2006–2008	2009–2011	2012–2013	2014
NRCan City	16.1 L/100 km	15.7 L/100 km	15.2 L/100 km	
NRCan Highway	11.9 L/100 km	11.5 L/100 km	11.3 L/100 km	
NRCan Combined	14.2 L/100 km	13.9 L/100 km	13.5 L/100 km	13.4 L/100 km
EPA City	15 mpg_{‑us}		16 mpg_{‑us}	
EPA Highway	20 mpg_{‑us}		21 mpg_{‑us}	
EPA Combined	17 mpg_{‑us}			

=== Interior, equipment, and trims ===
Interior of a 2009-2014 Honda Ridgeline RTL (US) with GPS navigation (2009 model depicted)
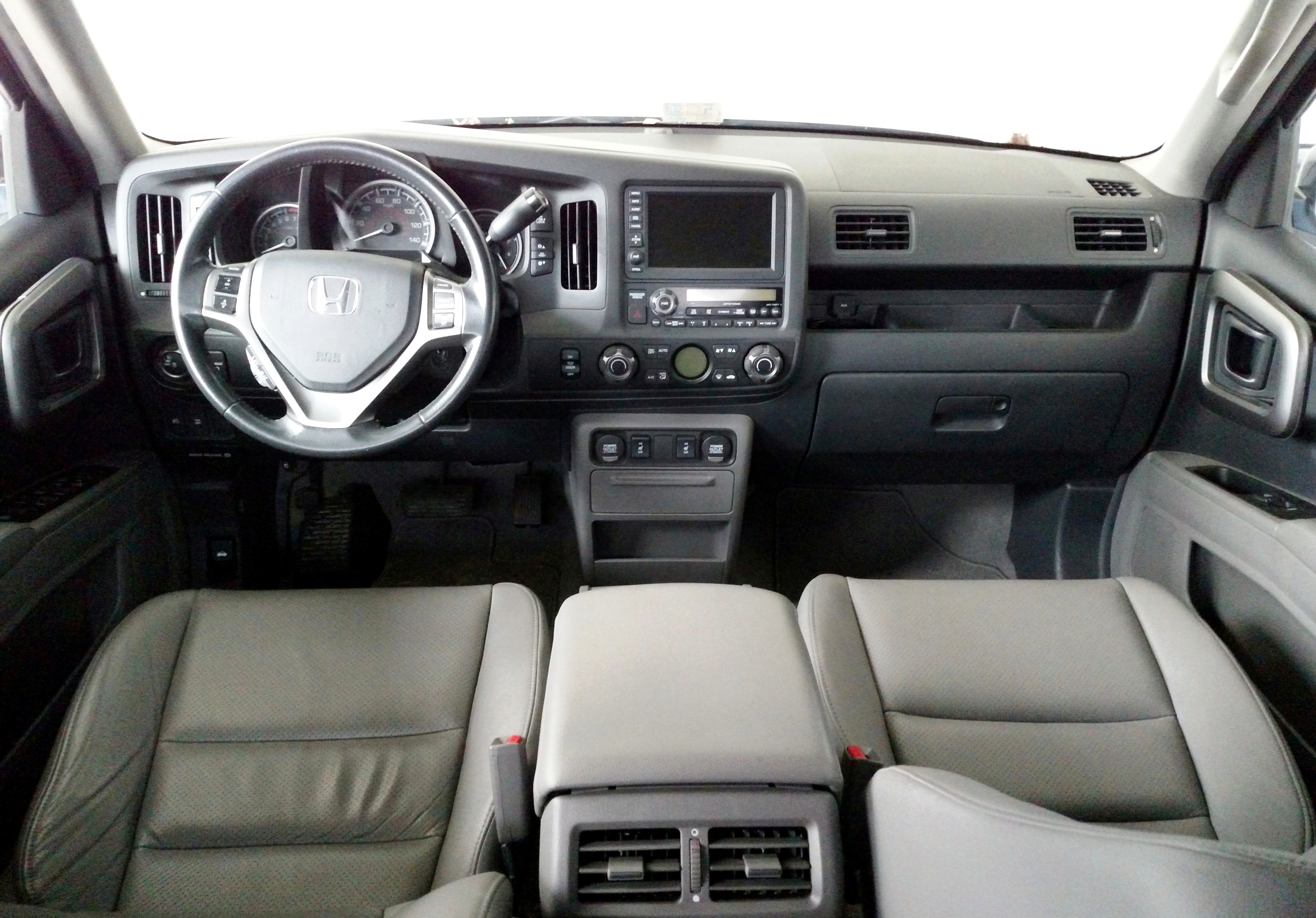

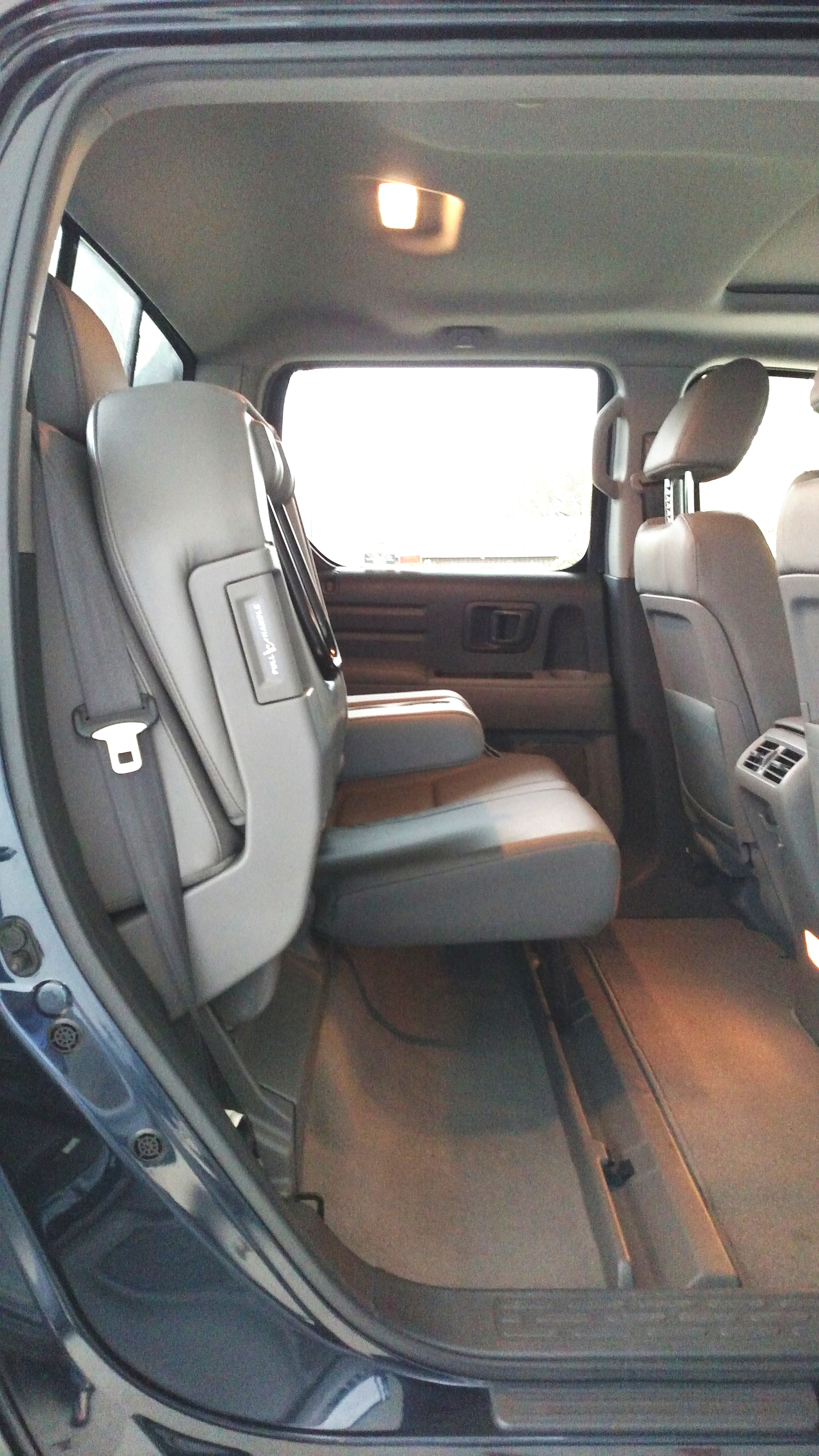
Note the 60/40 split rear-seat and flat load floor

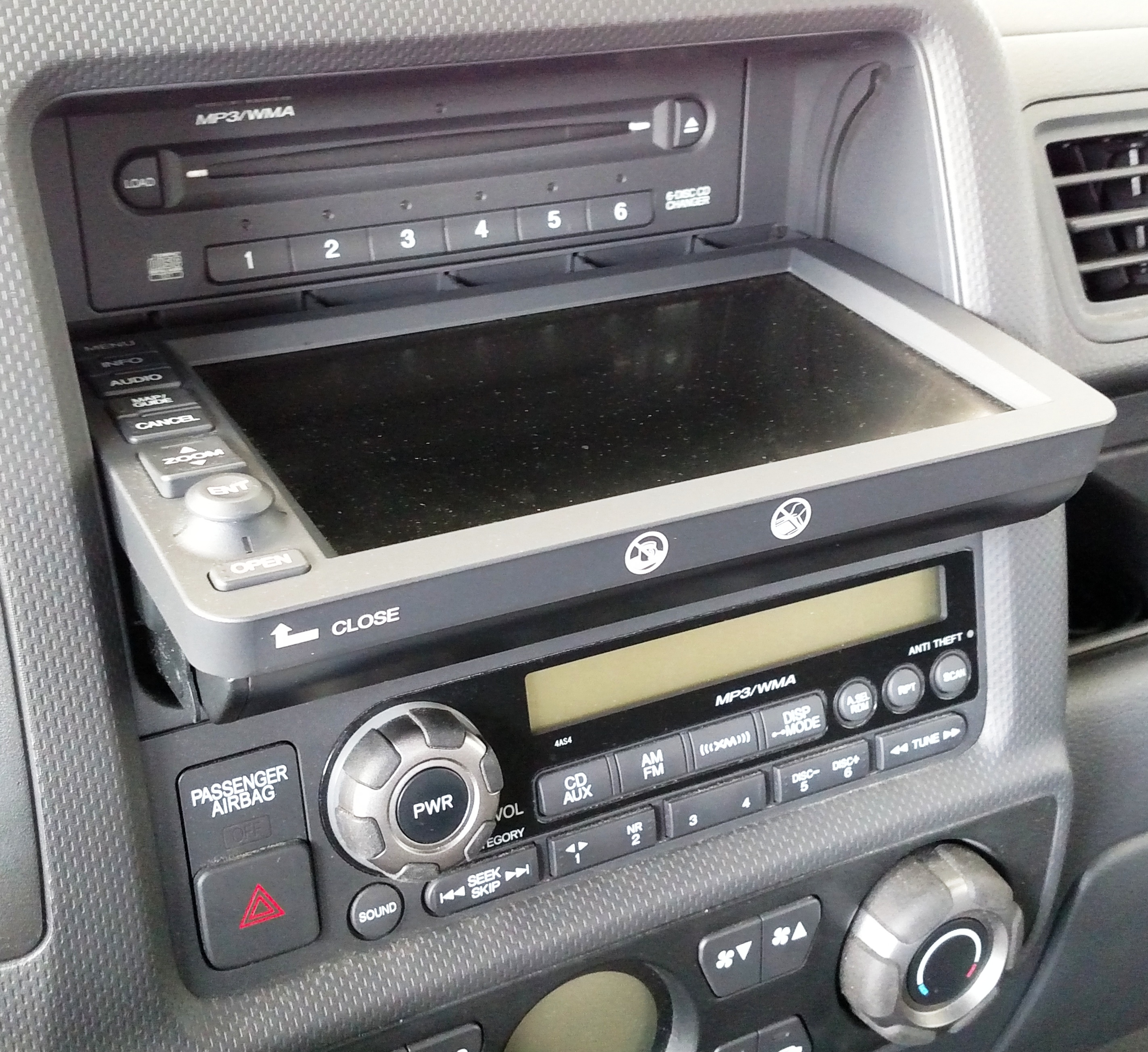
Ridgelines equipped with GPS navigation have a six-disc CD changer located behind the 8 in (20 cm) touchscreen, which pivots out of the way for access

Animation depicting the center console's features

In addition to the features described above, according to Car and Driver, the United States (US) version of the 2006 Ridgeline's base trim model came with standard equipment not offered in its competition's base trim mid-size trucks of the same model year. As you progress into more equivalent crew-cab, short-box, four-wheel drive mid-size trucks of that year, you still see features not found in the competition, such as:

- 8 in (20 cm) infotainment touchscreen navigation unit with a 160 W, seven-speaker, AM/FM/XM radio, and six-disc CD player
- Dual-zone climate control system with multiple front and rear independently controlled air vents
- Multi–function center console with telescoping armrest, three-tiered expandable storage with various organizers, two cup holders, and a 115 volt (V)/100 W alternating current (AC) power outlet inside
- Split 60/40 fold-up rear bench seat with fold-down center armrest, lower anchors and tethers for children (LATCH) system for three child safety seats with three adjustable head restraints, and a rear-passenger 12 V/10 A direct current (DC) outlet
- Four rear-passenger cup holders (one in each rear-door and two in the center armrest)
- Two shopping bag holders
- Power sliding rear-window

For the US market, the first generation Ridgeline was produced in six different trim levels through its lifetime, starting in 2006 with the base model RT, followed by the RTS, and the RTL. Additional trims—the RTX, Sport, and SE—were added and/or subtracted from the lineup over the first generation's lifespan. The base model RT trim came with cruise control, power windows and locks with remote, six-speaker 100 W AM/FM/CD audio system, and more. The RTX trim added a class III tow hitch, four and seven-pin trailer wiring harness, Hexagonal style black grille, and 17 in (43.2 cm) gray painted aluminum alloy rims. The Sport trim was similar to the RTX but had an exterior blackout treatment, fog lights, a saw-tooth style black grille, 18 in (45.7 cm) polished aluminum alloy rims with back trim, and added some audio system features but did not come with a trailer wiring harness. The RTS trim added interior amenities to the base model with an upgraded 160 W/seven-speaker/six-disc audio system, dual-zone automatic climate control, as well as 17 in (43.2 cm) polished aluminum alloy rims, and more with later models coming equipped with full towing equipment. The RTL trim was the leather bound top trim for most of the first generation Ridgeline's production with all of the amenities found in the other trims and added an optional moonroof, 8 in (20.3 cm) infotainment touchscreen navigation unit and XM Satellite Radio. The short lived SE trim took the RTL trim and made all of its optional equipment standard, added the Sport trim's exterior appearance as well as its blackout treatment, which continued onto the SE's interior.

For the Canadian market, the Ridgeline was produced in seven different trim levels throughout its production: DX, VP, LX, Sport, Special Edition, EX-L, and Touring. Although there were differences in packaging between the US and Canadian trims, the only technical differences were the use of daytime running lights on all trims and model years, metric system gauges, and bilingual (English and French) voice recognition and navigation system. The Canadian DX or VP trim were the base trim packages and were very similar to the RT. The LX trim was the next in the lineup, sitting around the RTX. The Canadian Sport trim was the third fanciest in the lineup and was very similar to the Sport trim sold in the US The Special Edition trim was next in the lineup; although it shared the SE's exterior components and blackout treatment, its features put it around the RTS trim. The EX-L or Touring trim were at the top of the lineup and were similar to the RTL and SE with a few exceptions.

For the Mexican market, only an RTL trim was available and had a few twists to its packaging that set it apart from its US and Canadian counterparts. The Mexican RTL came equipped very similarly to the Canadian EX-L However, unlike the EX-L, navigation was never a factory option.

For the Chilean market, the Ridgeline was sold in RT and RTL trims. The Chilean RT was a mix between the Canadian DX and VP trims while the Chilean RTL consisted of options found in the early model Canadian EX-L trim.

== Updates ==
From its introduction to its final production run, the first generation Ridgeline was offered in three to seven different exterior colors as well as one to three different interior colors depending on country, model year, and trim level. All of the exterior colors were monotone with some black and/or chrome trim. Interior colors—which rotated between olive, beige, gray, and black—were mated to specific exterior colors and trim levels. Below is a sortable table of all exterior colors the first generational Ridgeline came with by model year and trim level in the US and Canada.

Exterior paint name and code	2006	2007	2008	2009	2010	2011	2012	2013	2014
Formal Black (NH-707)		RT, LX, RTX, RTS, EX-L, and RTL	RT, LX, RTX, RTS, EX-L, and RTL	DX, VP, and EX-L					
Crystal Black Pearl (NH-731P)					RT, DX, VP, RTS, EX-L, and RTL	RT, DX, VP, RTS, EX-L, and RTL	RT, DX, VP, Sport, RTS, RTL, and Touring	RT, DX, VP, Sport, RTS, RTL, and Touring	RT, DX, Sport, RTS, Special Edition, RTL, Touring, and SE
Nighthawk Black Pearl (B-92P)	RT, LX, RTS, EX-L, and RTL			RT, DX, VP, RTS, EX-L, and RTL					
Bali Blue Pearl (B-552P)				RT, DX, VP, RTS, EX-L, and RTL	RT, VP, RTS, EX-L, and RTL	RT, VP, RTS, EX-L, and RTL	RT, VP, RTS, RTL, and Touring		
Obsidian Blue Pearl (B-588P)								RT, VP, RTS, RTL, and Touring	RT, RTS, RTL, and Touring
Steel Blue Metallic (B-533M)	RT, LX, RTS, EX-L, and RTL	RT, LX, RTX, RTS, EX-L, and RTL	RT, LX, RTX, RTS, EX-L, and RTL						
Dark Cherry Pearl (R-529P)		RT, LX, RTX, RTS, EX-L, and RTL	RT, LX, RTX, RTS, EX-L, and RTL	RT, DX, VP, RTS, EX-L, and RTL	RT, VP, RTS, EX-L, and RTL	RT, VP, RTS, EX-L, and RTL	RT, VP, RTS, RTL, and Touring	RT, VP, RTS, RTL, and Touring	RTS, RTL, and Touring
Redrock Pearl (R-519P)	RT, LX, RTS, EX-L, and RTL								
Amazon/Ammanite Green Metallic (G-521M)	LX, RTS, EX-L and RTL								
Aberdeen Green Metallic (G-525M)		LX, RTS, EX-L, and RTL							
Mocha Metallic (YR-573M)				VP, RTS, EX-L, and RTL	VP, RTS, EX-L, and RTL	RTS and RTL			
Polished Metal Metallic (NH-737M)					RT, DX, VP, RTS, EX-L, and RTL	RT, DX, VP, RTS, EX-L, and RTL	RT, DX, VP, RTS, RTL, and Touring	RT, DX, VP, RTS, RTL, and Touring	
Modern Steel Metallic (NH-797M)									RT, DX, RTS, RTL, and Touring
Nimbus Gray Metallic (NH-705M)		RT, LX, RTS, EX-L, and RTL	RT, LX, RTS, EX-L, and RTL						
Sterling Gray Metallic (NH-741M)				RT, DX, VP, RTS, EX-L, and RTL					
Billet Silver Metallic (NH-689M)	RT, LX, RTS, EX-L, and RTL	RT, LX, RTX, RTS, EX-L, and RTL	RT, LX, RTX, RTS, EX-L, and RTL	RT, DX, VP, RTS, EX-L, and RTL					
Alabaster Silver Metallic (NH-700M)					RT, DX, VP, RTS, EX-L, and RTL	RT, DX, VP, RTS, EX-L, and RTL	RT, DX, VP, Sport (US), RTS, RTL, and Touring	RT, VP, Sport, RTS, RTL, and Touring	RT, Sport, RTS, Special Edition, RTL, Touring, and SE
White/Taffeta White (NH-578)	RT, RTS, and RTL	RT, LX, RTX, RTS, EX-L, and RTL	RT, LX, RTX, RTS, EX-L, and RTL	RT, DX, VP, RTS, EX-L, and RTL	RT, DX, VP, RTS, EX-L, and RTL	RT, DX, VP, RTS, EX-L, and RTL	RT, DX, VP, Sport, RTS, RTL, and Touring	RT, DX, VP, Sport, RTS, RTL, and Touring	DX, Sport, Special Edition, RTL, SE, and Touring

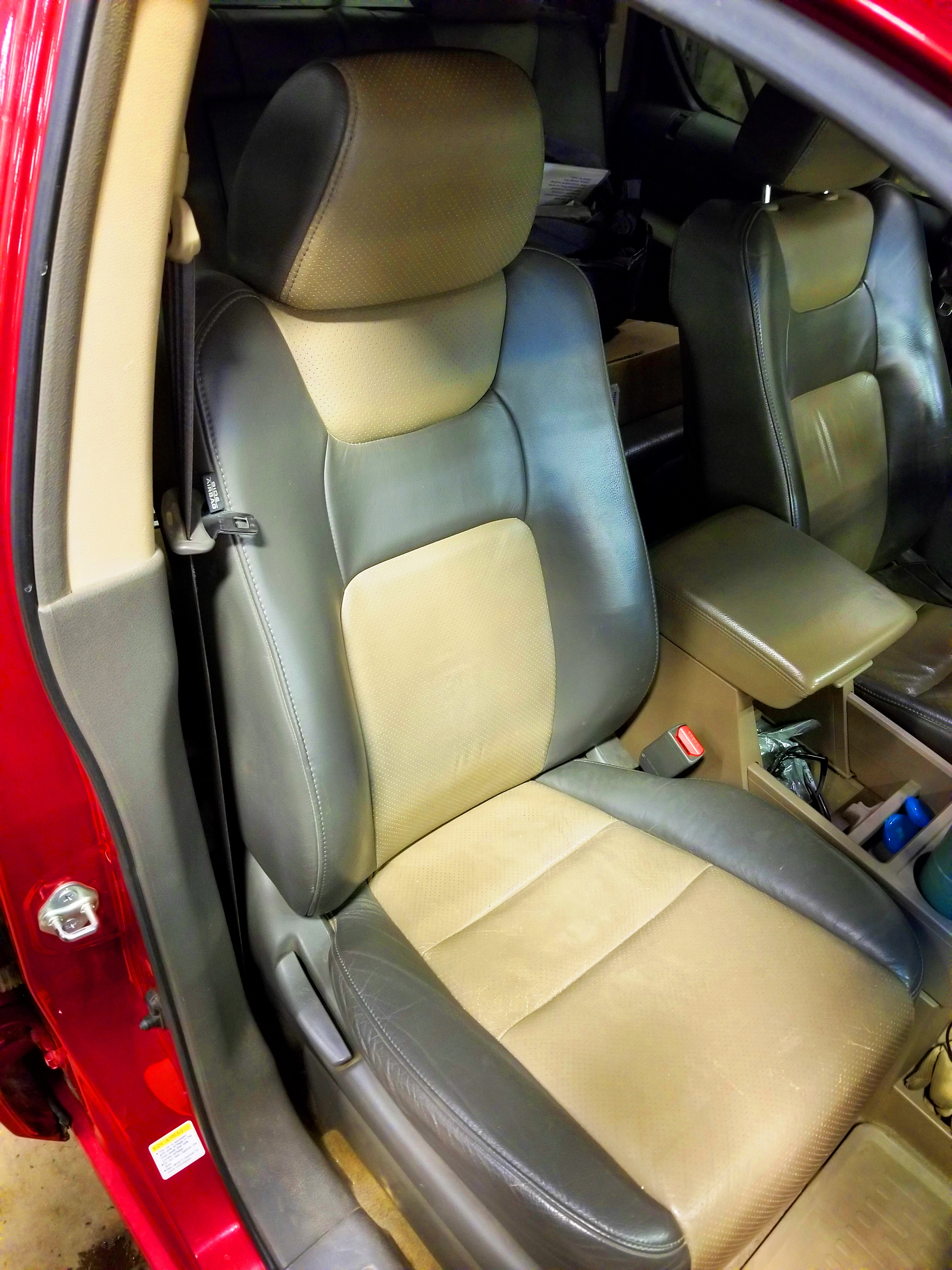
2006 Ridgeline RTL two-tone leather upholstery

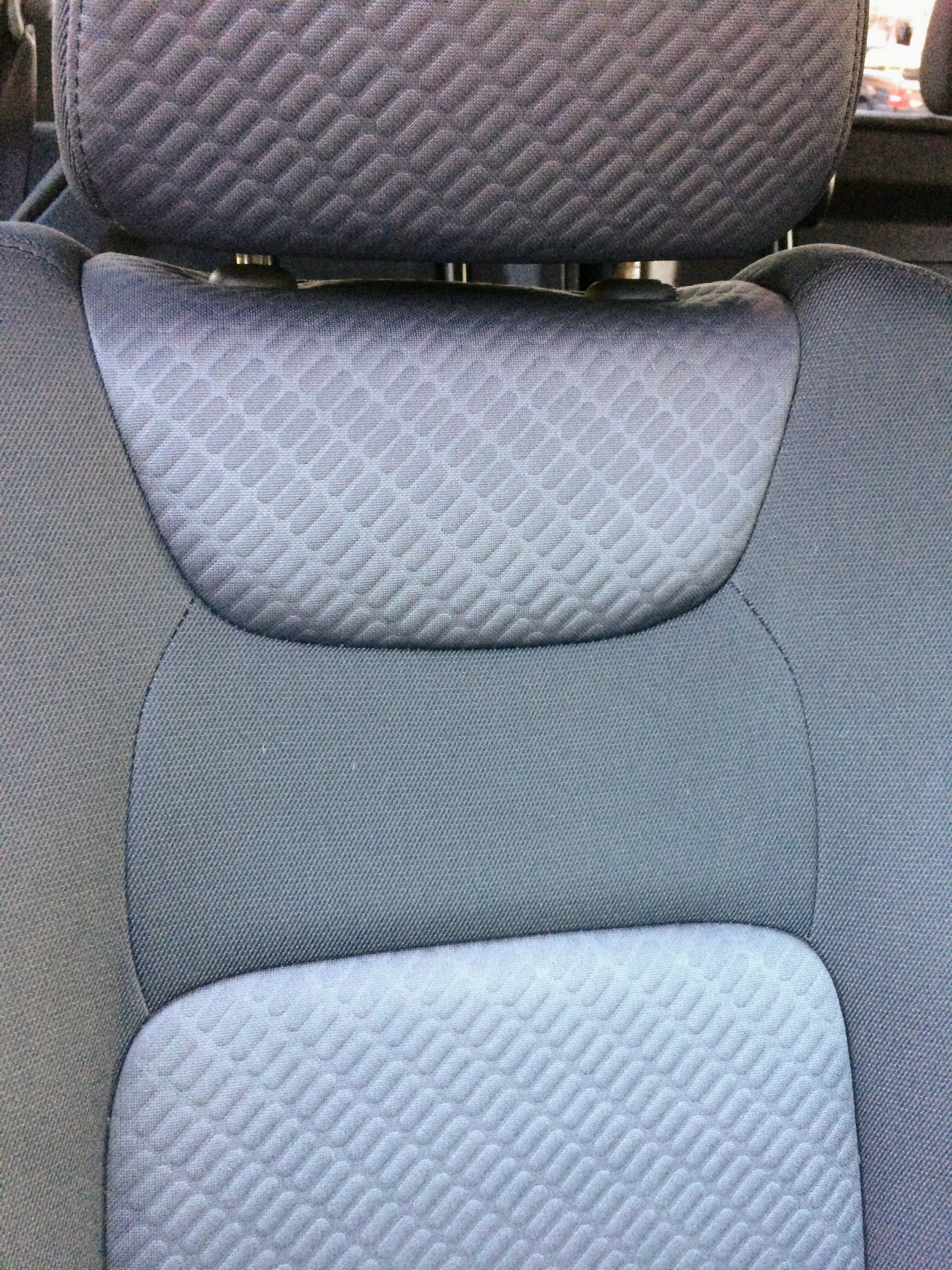
2006–2007 Ridgeline two-tone cloth upholstery (2006 RTS)

For the 2007 model year, the RTX trim package was introduced in the US market as a unique tow-ready version of the Ridgeline. Also the RTL trim package was modified making the moonroof and XM Satellite Radio options standard equipment and its two-tone leather upholstery was redone with new monotone leather. Honda also added a driver-side illuminated vanity mirror to all trim levels and removed the only interior color option available to buyers by deleting the olive interior choice from white painted Ridgelines, leaving only beige.

For the 2008 model year, the Ridgeline's interior was changed with the removal of their olive color, the replacement of two-tone fabric upholsteries with monotone versions, and the male voice on the RTL's navigation system was removed to increase space for more points of interest. Additionally, the RTS and RTL trims where outfitted with more polished versions of their alloy rims.

For the 2009 model year, the Ridgeline received its first refresh with over 50 different changes, including exterior and interior updates as well as drivetrain improvements. Some of the more noticeable changes were:

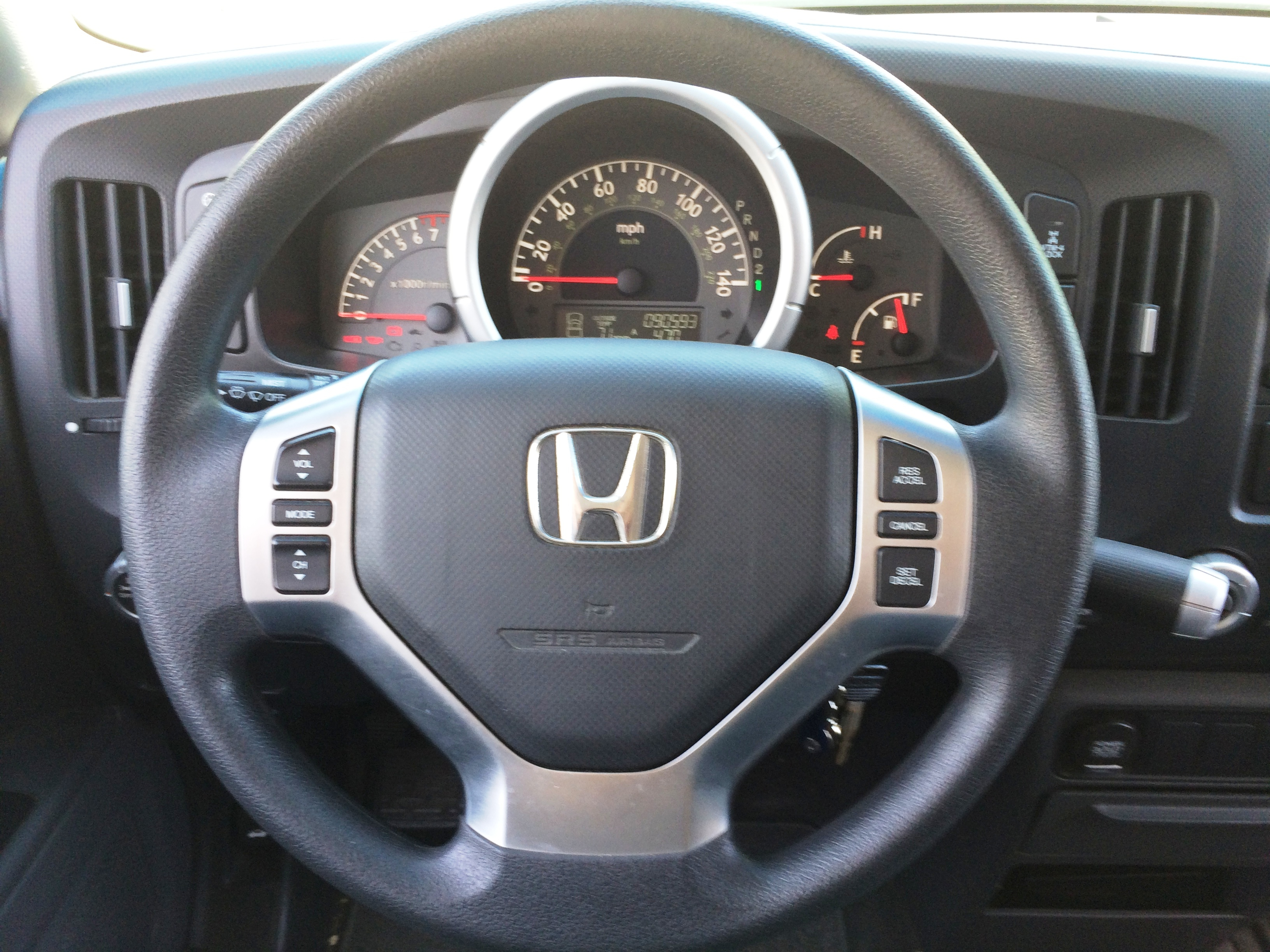
Instrument cluster and steering wheel of the 2006–2008 Ridgeline (2006 RTS)

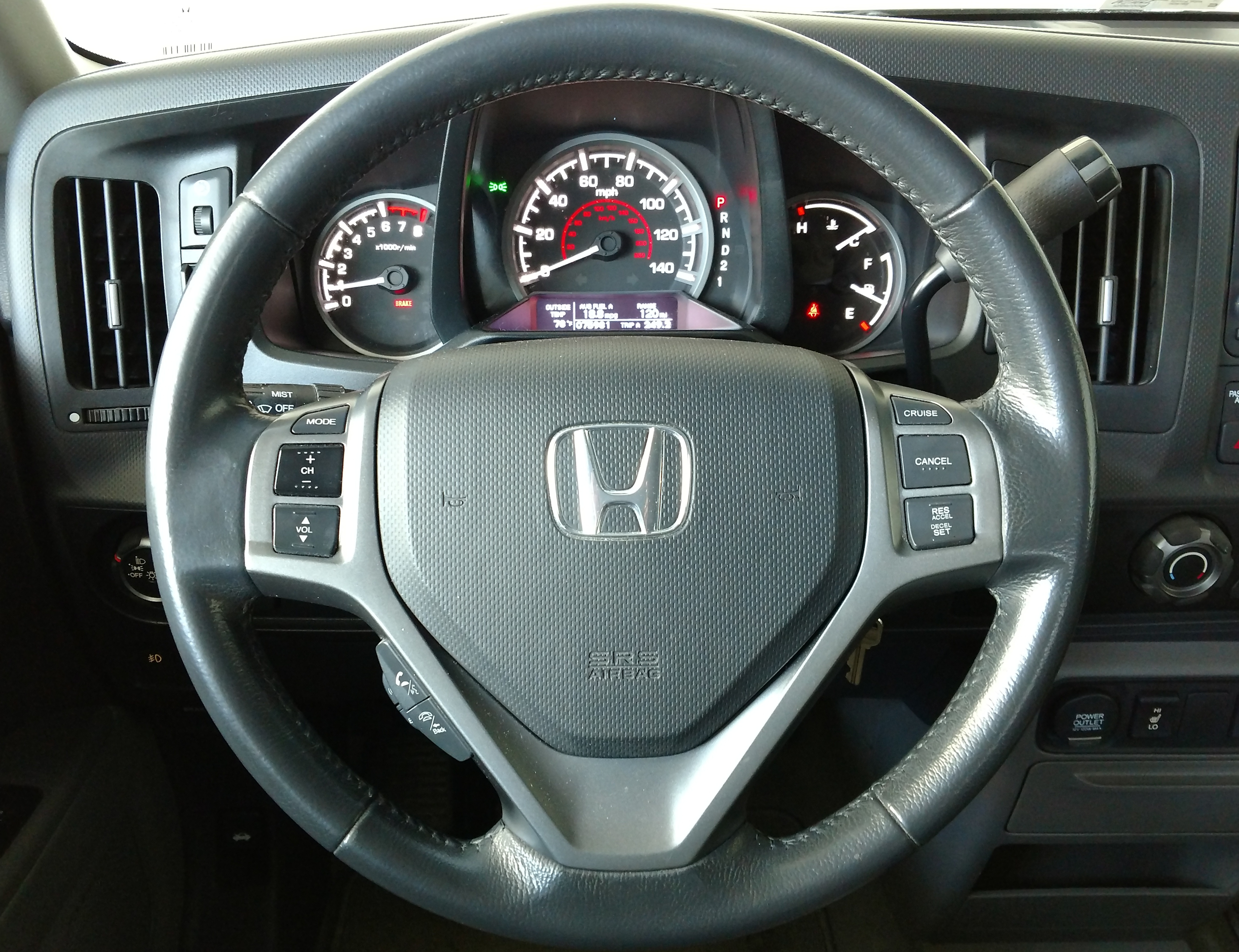
Instrument cluster and steering wheel of the 2009–2014 Ridgeline (2009 US RTL with navigation)

- New front-end with daytime running lights
- New solid-red taillights
- New rear step-bumper with integrated class III tow hitch
- Two additional bed cleats
- New instrument cluster and steering wheel—with all cruise control functions consolidated onto the steering wheel
- Multi-format—Pulse-Code Modulation (PCM), MPEG-1/2 audio layer III (MP3), and Windows Media Audio (WMA)—CD player
- Driver and front-passenger active head restraints and more...

Power and torque comparison between the J35A9 and the J35Z5 engines

A new V6 engine was introduced that produces up to 10 lb⋅ft (14 N⋅m) more torque at lower RPM than its predecessor with a slight horsepower increase of 3 hp (2.2 kW) at the top of its RPM band. Also, the H5 transmission was revised with the greatest difference found in third and fourth gears providing approximately 5% lower ratios. In the US, the RTX trim was removed from the lineup and the RTS trim gained a power-adjustable lumbar, an auxiliary 3.5mm tip-ring-sleeve (TRS) stereo input jack, and a seven-pin trailer wiring harness while losing dual-zone climate control synchronization. The US RTL trim gained a seven-pin trailer wiring harness, 18 in (45.7 cm) machine finished alloy rims, fog lights, and a 115 V/100 W AC inverter; if equipped with navigation, the US RTL also received a rearview camera displayed on the navigation screen, Class 2 Bluetooth with Honda's HandsFreeLink system and a multi-data/multilingual information display. For Canadians, a new lineup of trim levels were introduced that more closely resembled the US—moving from the LX and EX–L to the DX, VP, and EX–L trim packages—with the top trim receiving XM Satellite Radio for the first time.

For the 2010 and 2011 model years, with the exception of some exterior color changes, Honda made no updates to the Ridgeline.

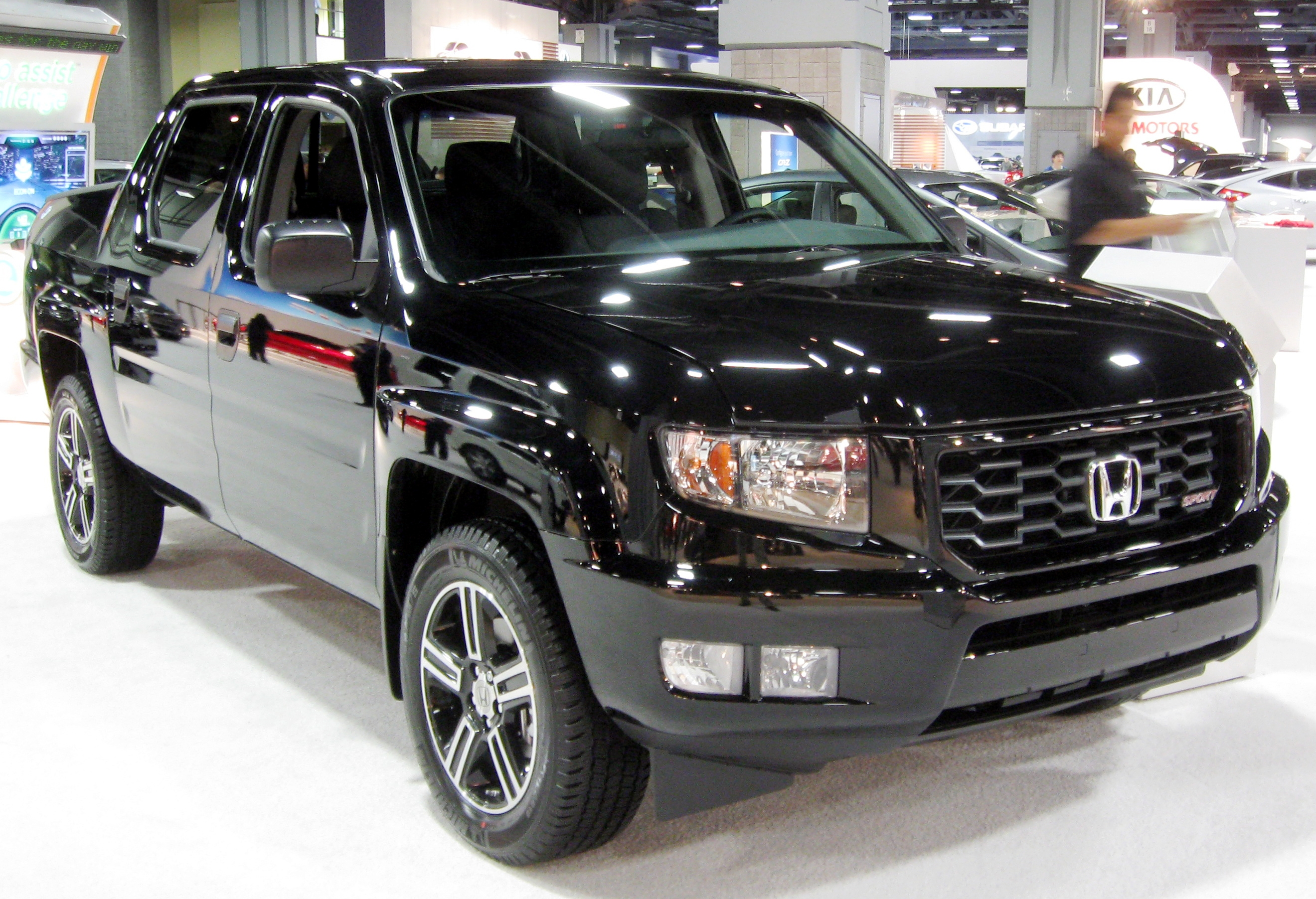
Fairings were added to the 2012–2014 Ridgeline's front air dam to help improve fuel economy (2012 Sport)

For the 2012 model year, Honda put the Ridgeline through another refresh. Honda introduced a new Sport trim for the US and Canadian markets with audio system updates such as: an auxiliary 3.5mm TRS stereo input jack, steering-wheel mounted audio controls, and a blackout exterior package highlighted with black accented 18 in (45.7 cm) alloy rims and a red "SPORT" grille badge. Also, the Canadian EX-L trim was replaced with a new Touring package. Additionally, a new grille was introduced for all but the Sport trim. Also, new taillights were introduced. For Mexico, their RTL trim received the US and Canadian Sport trim's exterior package while retaining its Canadian EX-L interior. All versions received aerodynamic improvements to the body and friction reduction measures were made to the engine, which improved city and highway fuel economy by 1 mpg_{‑us} and 0.5 to 0.2 L/100 km, according to EPA and NRCan testing respectively.

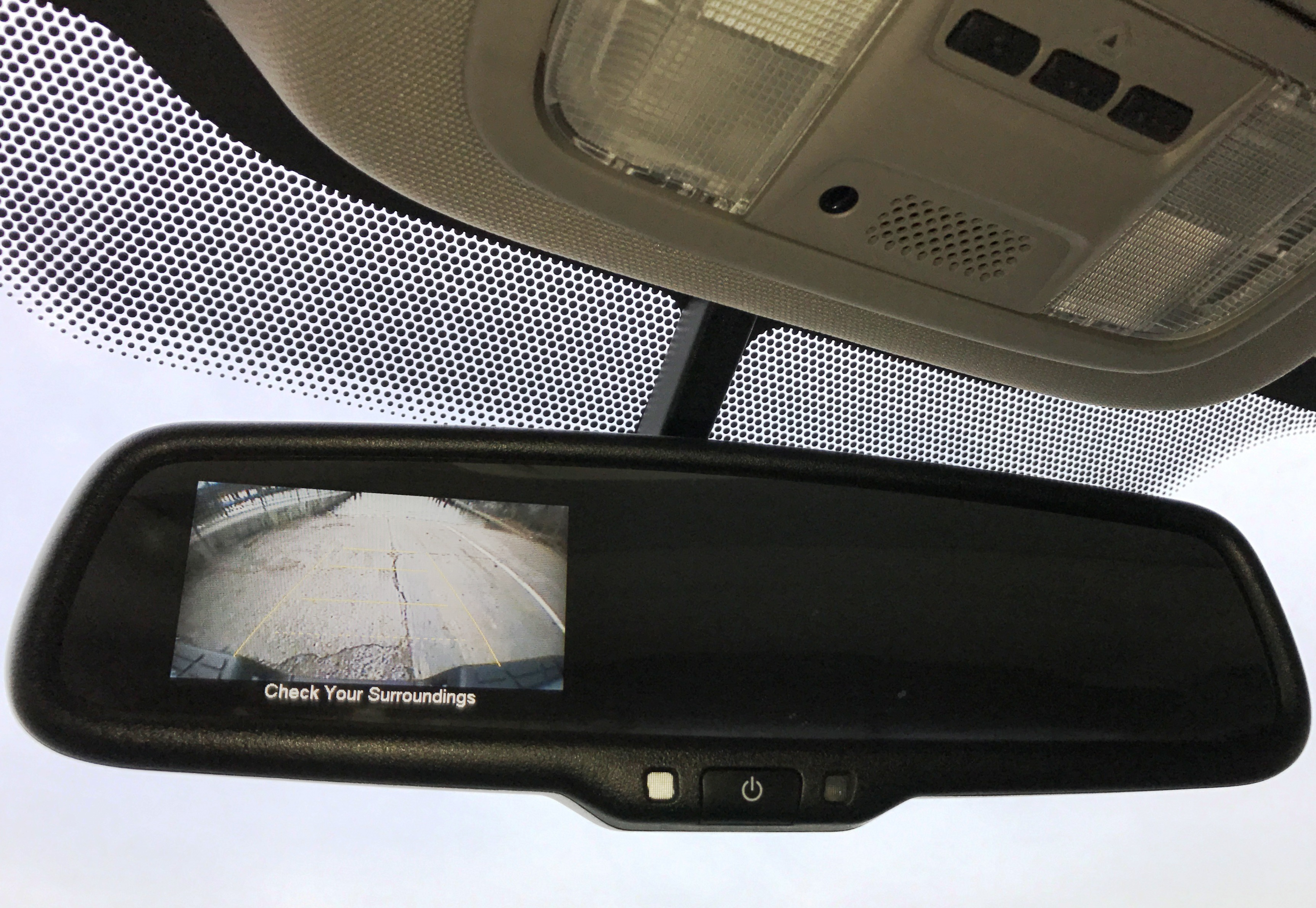
2013–2014 Ridgeline rearview mirror backup camera with distance guidelines (2014 RTL)

For the 2013 model year, all Ridgelines, if not already equipped, were outfitted with a backup camera that's displayed in the rearview mirror with integrated distance guidelines of 1.7 ft (0.5 m), 3.3 ft (1 m), 6.6 ft (2 m), and 9.8 ft (3 m). With this addition, the digital compass in the RTL trim's rearview mirror was deleted. Pictorial evidence suggest the Chilean market received the 2012 updated taillights as well as the 2009 18 in (45.7 cm) alloy rims for their RTL trim.

For the 2014 model year, Honda removed the VP trim from the Canadian lineup and added a new Special Edition package. In the US, the SE trim was introduced surpassing the RTL as the top trim package. Both the Canadian Special Edition and the US SE can be identified by their unique 18 in (45.7 cm) polished alloy rims with black trim and a "SPECIAL EDITION" tailgate badge.

Changes to the first generation Ridgeline's exterior over time

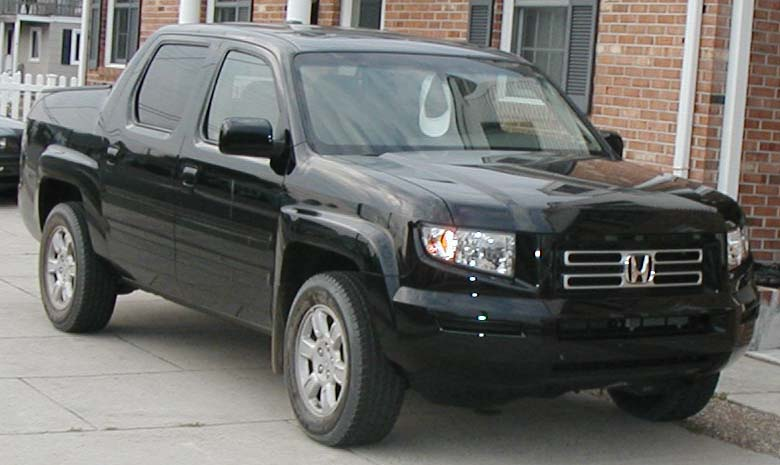
2006–2007 RTS, RTL, and EX-L

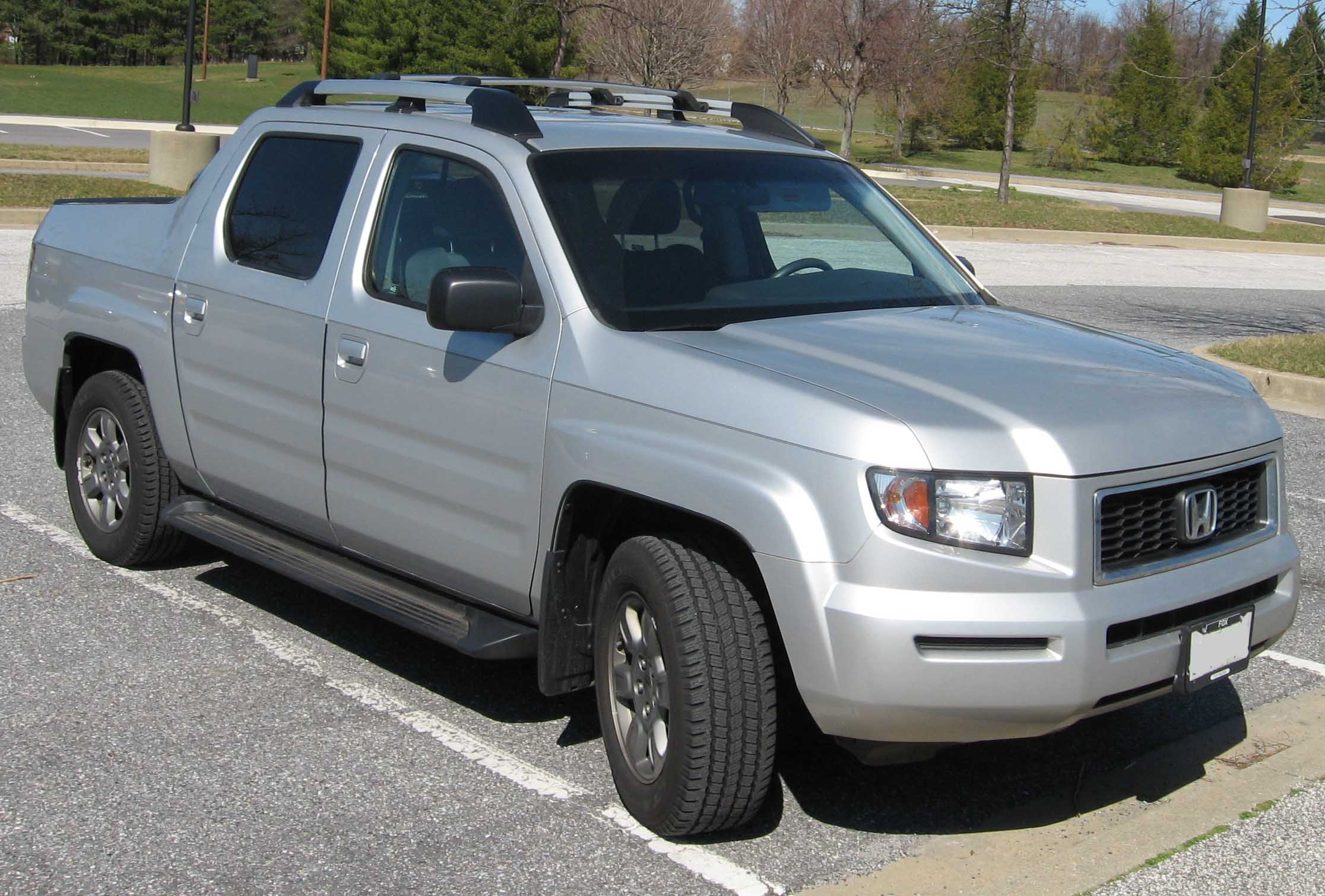
2007–2008 RTX (with OEM accessory roof rack and running boards)

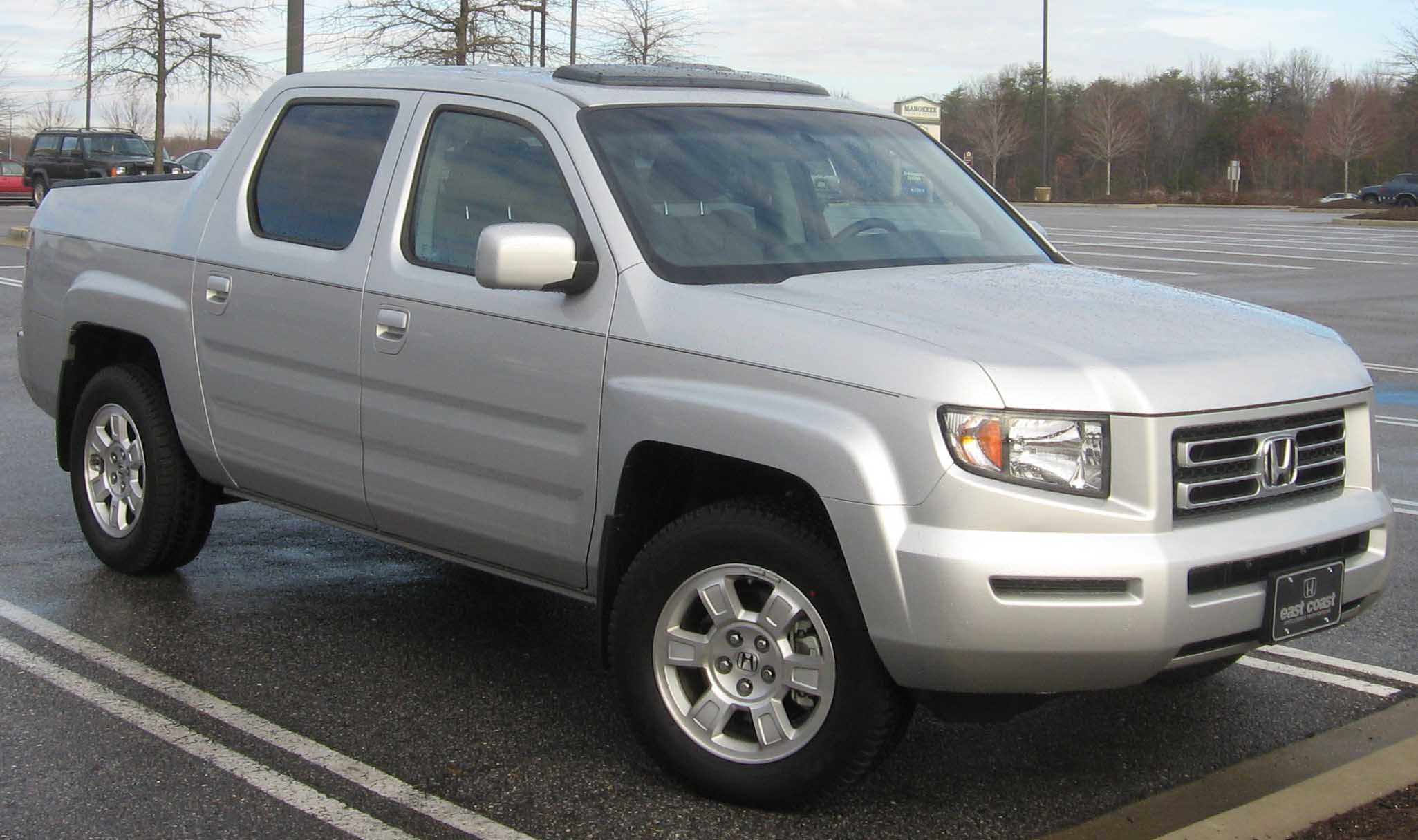
2008 RTL and EX-L (with OEM accessory moonroof visor)

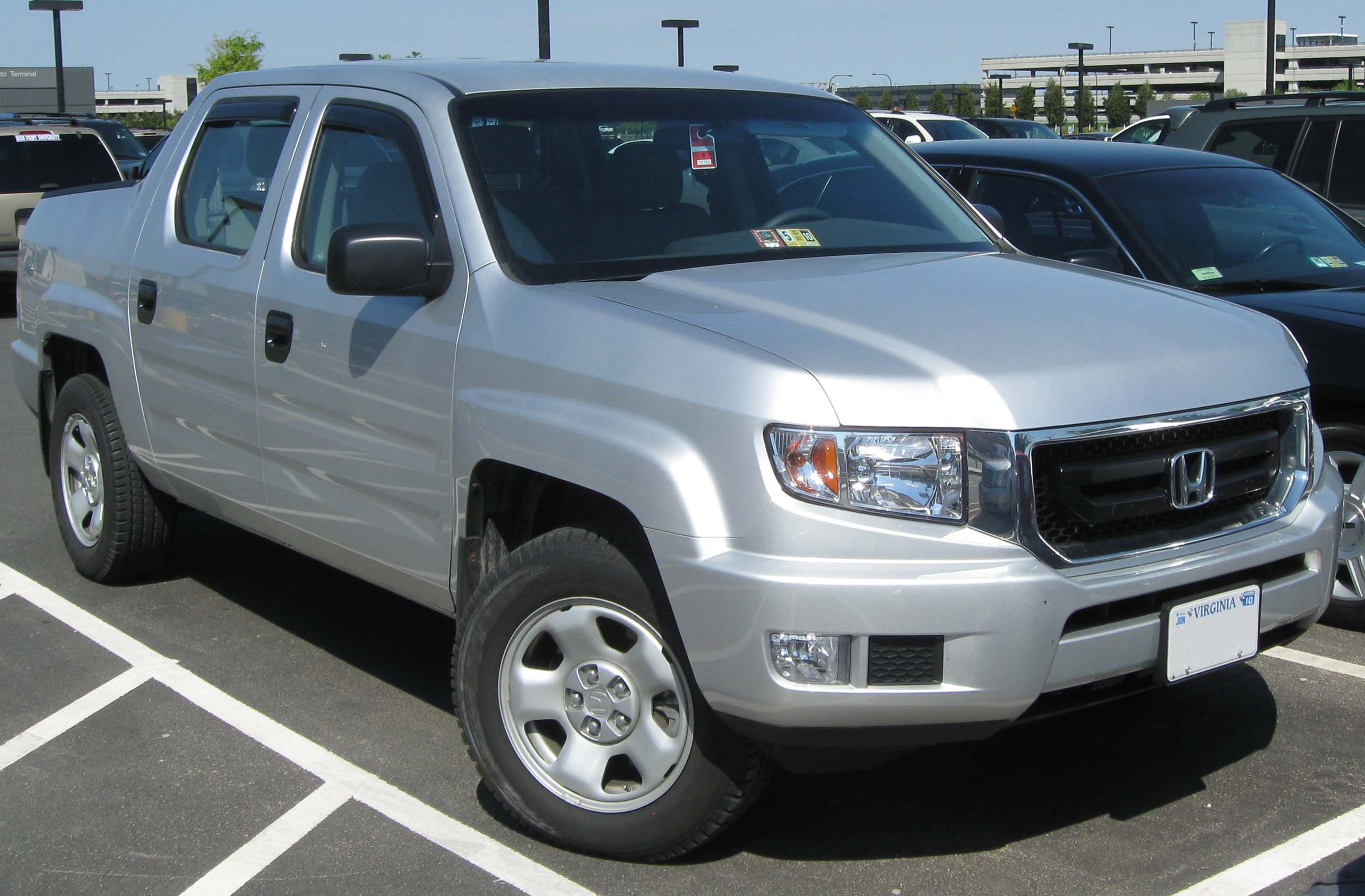
2009–2011 US RT and DX

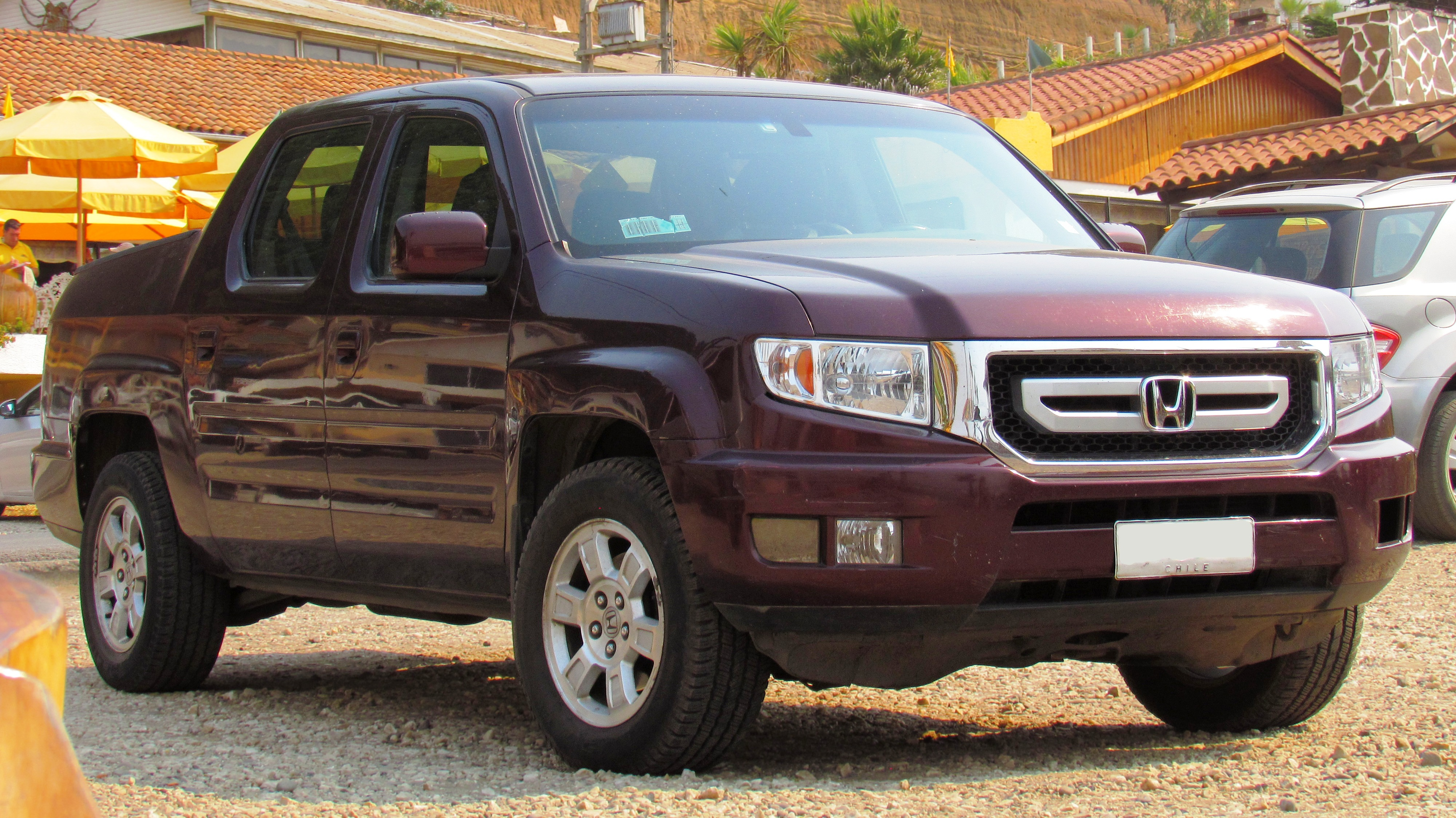
2009–2011 Chilean RTL, RTS (with OEM accessory fog lights), and VP

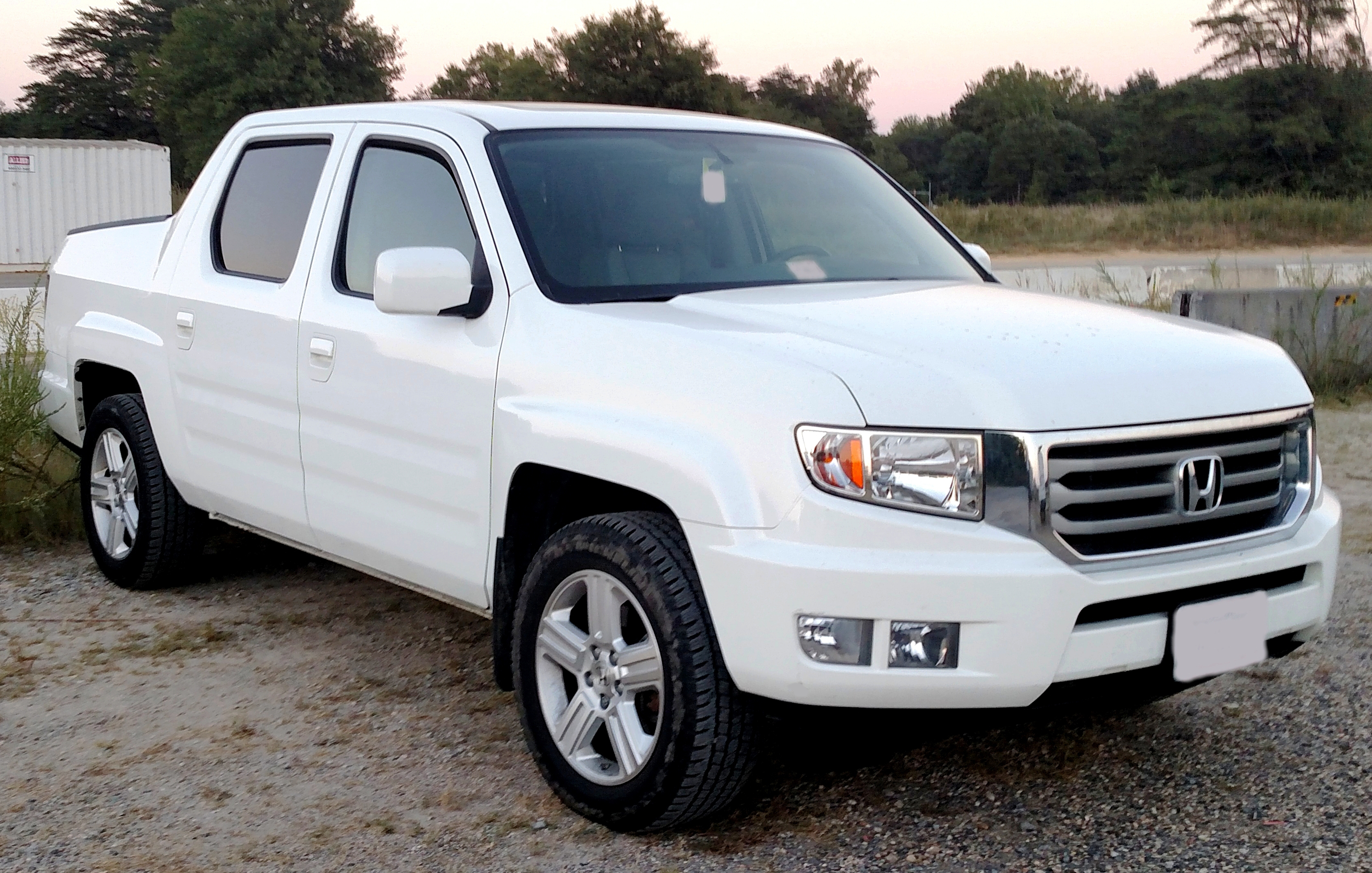
2012–2014 US RTL and Touring
2013–2014 Chilean RTL

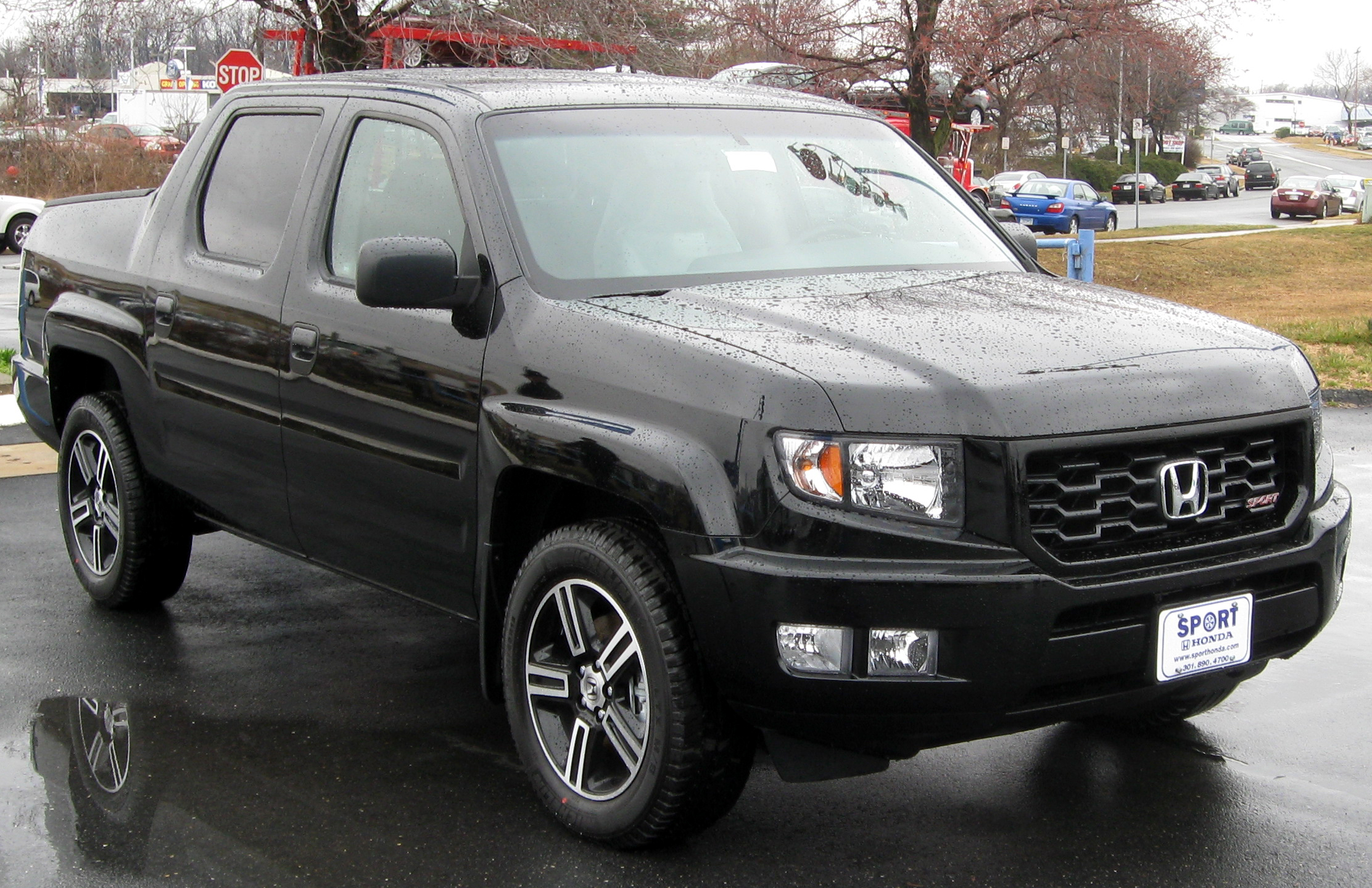
2012–2014 Sport and Mexican RTL

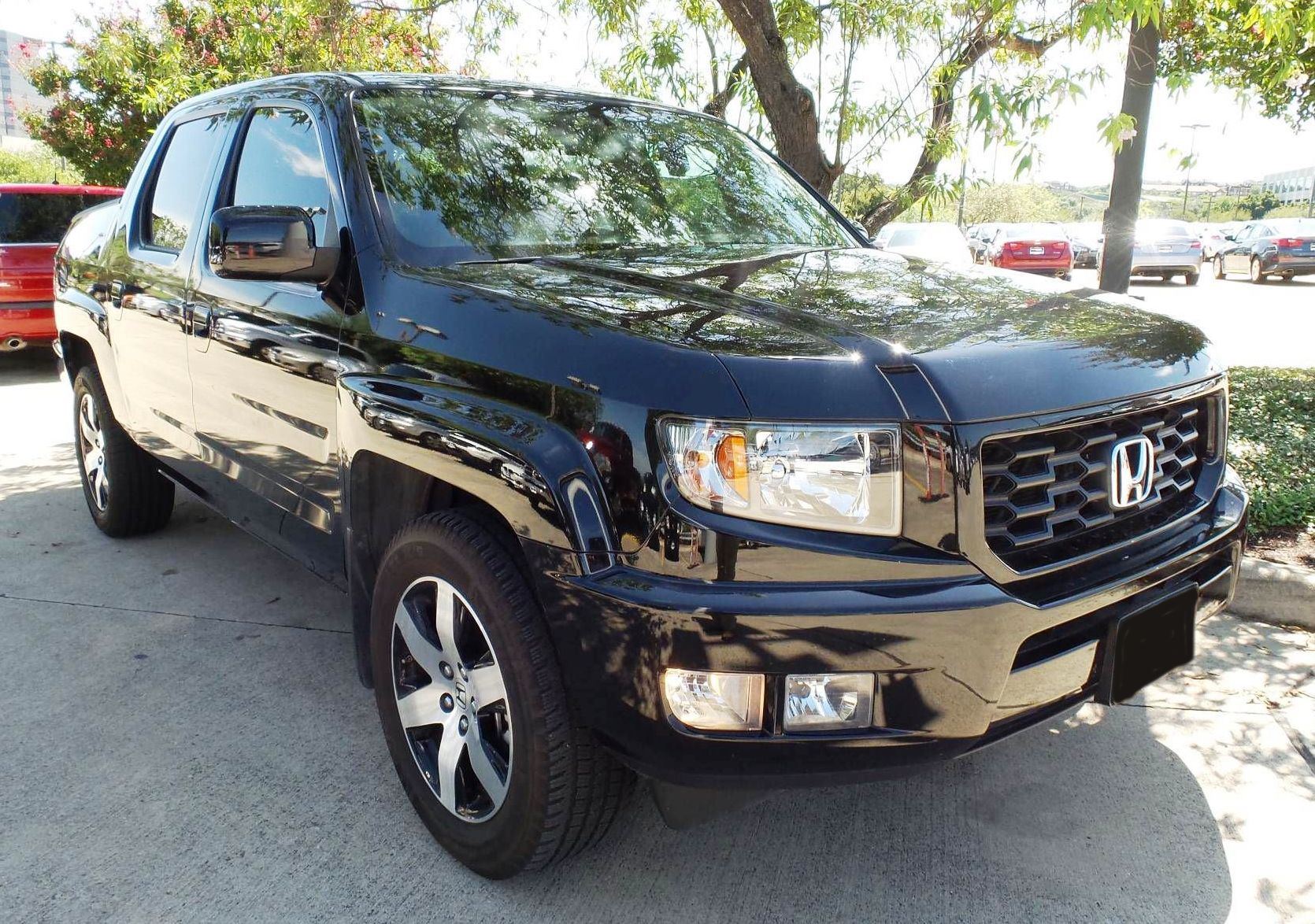
2014 SE and Special Edition

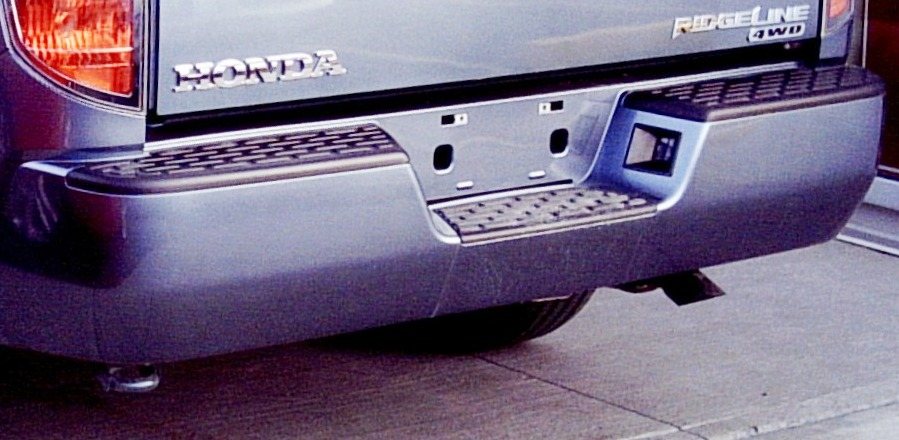
2006–2008 rear bumper with standard left-rear recovery hook

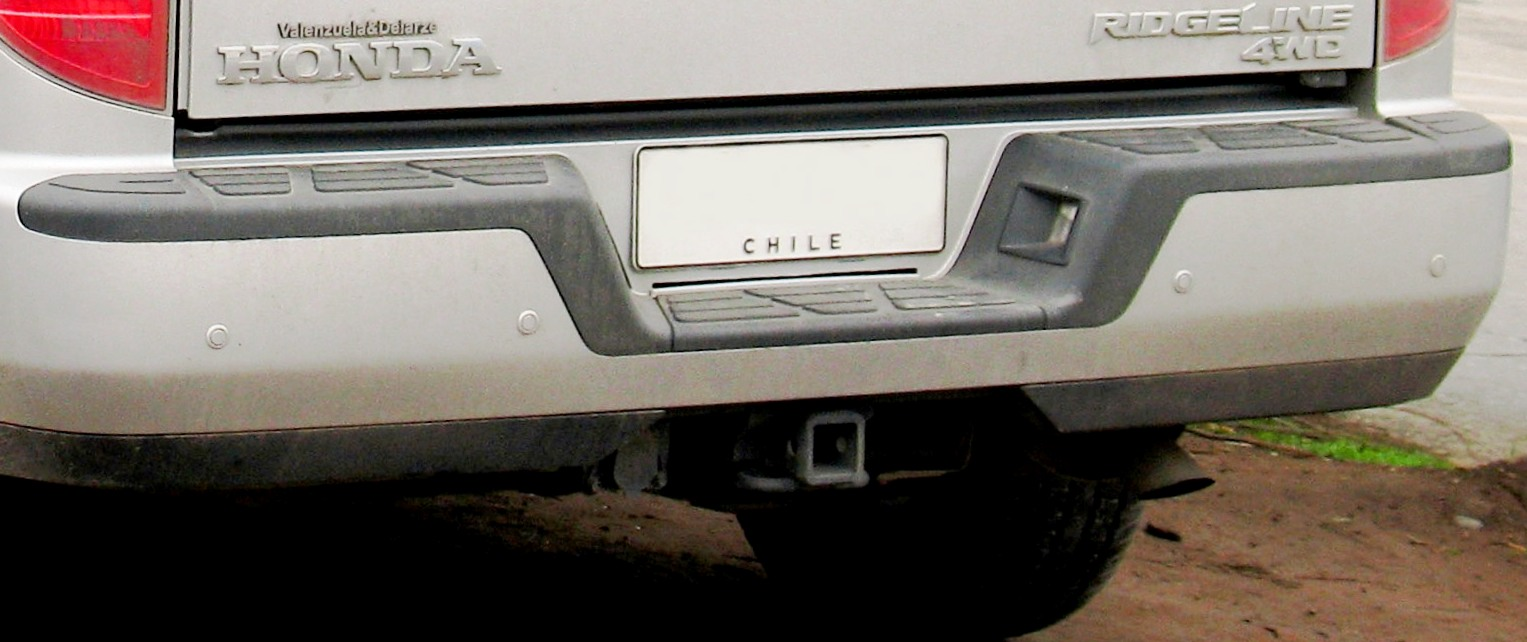
2009–2014 rear bumper with standard class III tow hitch and—on the RTS trim and up—a seven-pin wiring harnesses (with OEM accessory back-up sensors)

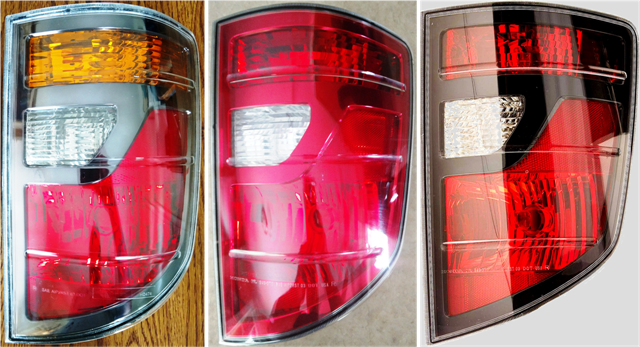
Taillight design changes from left to right: 2006–2008, 2009–2011, and 2012–2014 model years

== Safety ==
NHTSA safety ratings for the Honda Ridgeline:
Overall	5/5 stars
Frontal Driver	5/5 stars
Frontal Passenger	5/5 stars
Side Driver	5/5 stars
Side Passenger	5/5 stars
Rollover (14.3%)	4/5 stars

NHTSA front and side-impact tests of the Gen1 Ridgeline at 35 mph (56 km/h) and 38.5 mph (62 km/h), respectively (2006 RTS)

The Ridgeline is the first four-door pickup truck to earn the National Highway Traffic Safety Administration's (NHTSA) five-star safety rating for both front and side impact crash test performance and has the highest rollover resistance of any pickup NHTSA ever tested at 14.3%. Also, the Insurance Institute for Highway Safety (IIHS) tested the Ridgeline and awarded the 2009, 2012, and 2013 model years with its "Top Safety Pick" award.

== Comparisons ==
According to MSN Autos, when the first generation Ridgeline's advertised interior, passenger volume, and total payload is compared with the other mid-size trucks of its era—the Toyota Tacoma, Nissan Frontier, Suzuki Equator, Dodge Dakota, Ford Explorer Sport Trac, Ford Ranger, and GM's Colorado/Canyon—the Ridgeline has more amenities, greater interior space, and greater hauling capacity than its competition. However, when comparing the manufacturers' tow ratings the Ridgeline is at the bottom of its class. Excluding these extremes, the first generation Ridgeline tends to fall in the middle of these mid-size trucks' published specifications.

In 2012, PickupTrucks.com conducted a mid-size truck challenge with six of the eight trucks listed above—minus the Dakota and Sport Trac—and the Ridgeline. With the exception of a 2011 super-cab Ranger, all test vehicles were 2012 models and all had V6 engines except the Colorado with its LH8. The head-to-head comparisons focused on numerous attributes including objective tests on 0-60 mph (97 km/h), 60–0, and quarter-mile (0.4 km) times with maximum payloads as well as empty beds, dynamometer tests, and real-world fuel economy comparisons. Subjective tests included expert driver impressions, best value estimates, and an off-road course. All tests and evaluations were conducted at the same place and time to minimize environmental impacts. Of the seven mid-size trucks tested, the Ridgeline ranked third overall. Of the objective tests, the Ridgeline had the highest scores for payload and real-world fuel economy while ranking lowest in torque delivery at the wheels; otherwise, the Ridgeline ranked in the middle of the other objective tests. Of the subjective tests, the Ridgeline was judged second in expert impressions, third in best value, and last in the off-road course.

== Reception and sales ==
According to Automotive Design & Production, Honda was slow to enter the minivan and SUV markets, so "given that track record it is no surprise that Honda has just now [2005] gotten around to building a pickup truck." According to Bloomberg News, Honda hoped buyers would find it an attractive alternative to large SUVs and conventional pickup trucks.

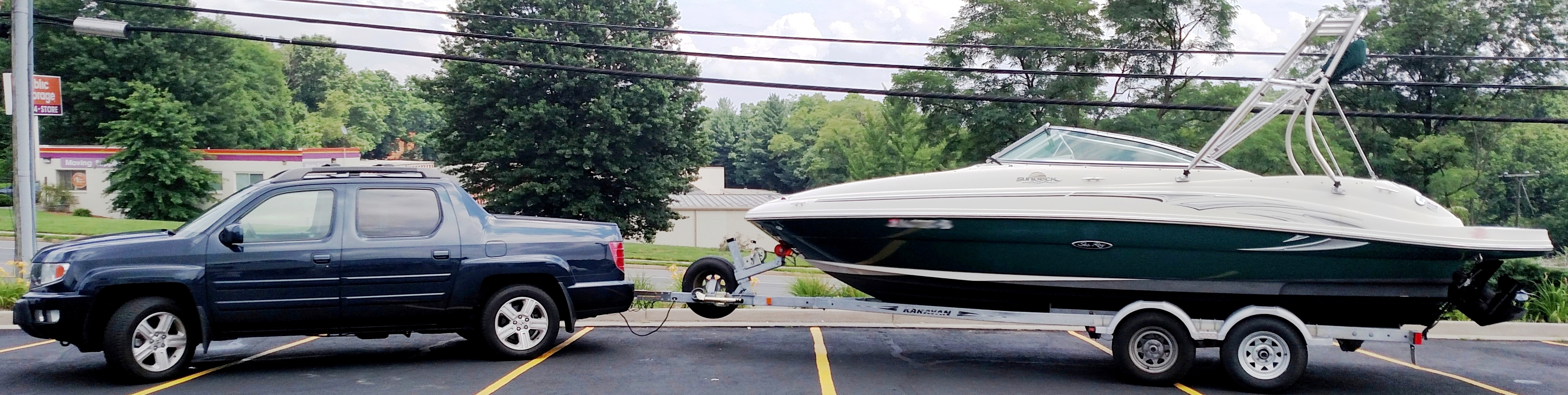
2009 Ridgeline RTL—with OEM roof rack, body-side molding, splash guards, and brush guard—towing a 2005 Sea Ray 220 Sundeck sport boat with wakeboard tower

2012 Ridgeline RTL (Mexican version) offroading in West Baja California Sur

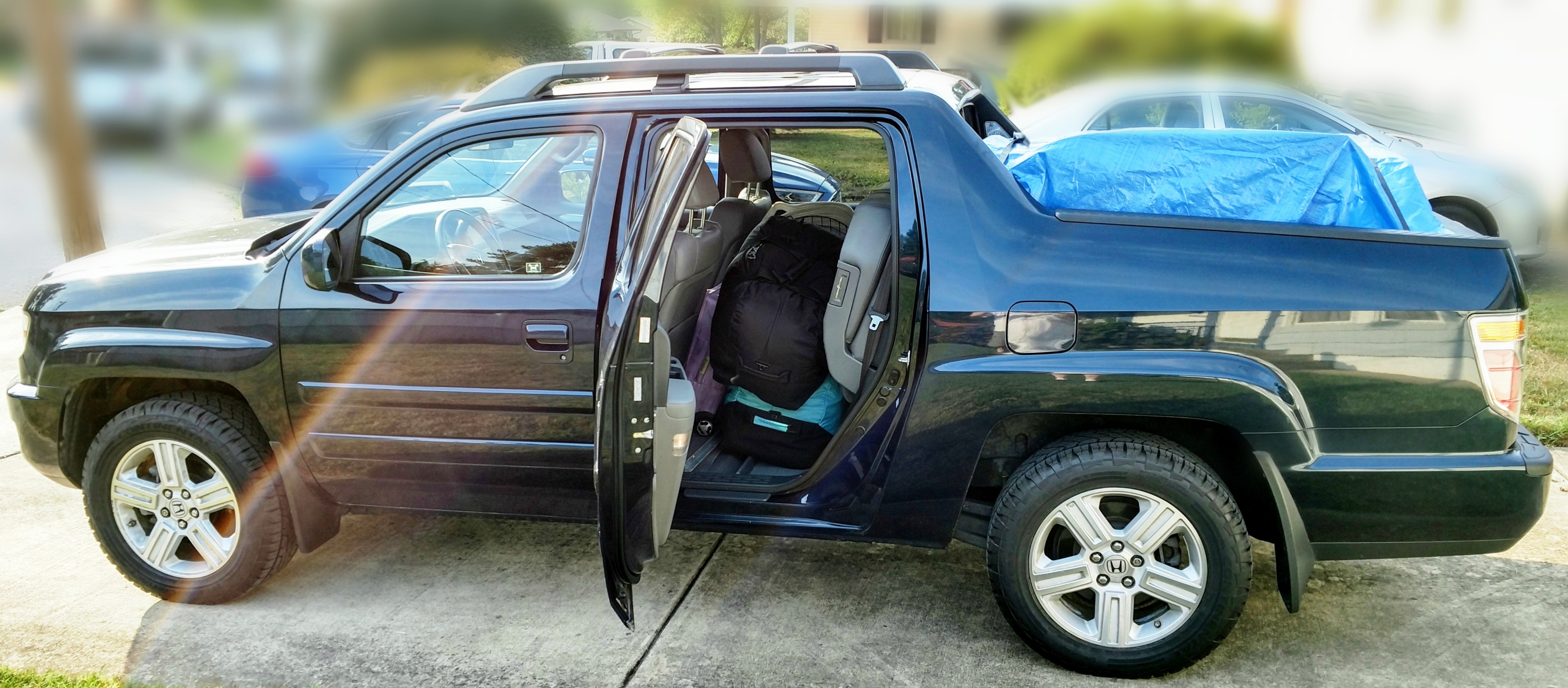
2009 Ridgeline RTL with rear seats stowed hauling cargo in second row and in bed

Some in the automotive press that have studied the Ridgeline, such as PickupTrucks.com, consider it "one of those odd vehicles." They wrote, "The Ridgeline can't really do what most people who like trucks need it to do." While AutoTrader.com wrote, "Sure, some homeowners and weekend warriors may actually need a 10,000-lb towing capacity, but the Honda Ridgeline is probably just right for most." Motor Trend conducted a long-term road test of the 2006 Ridgeline and stated that they "fully expected the hard-cores to be outraged" suggesting they would proclaim "It's a modified minivan," it "didn't qualify as a truck because of its unibody chassis and transverse-mounted engine," and that "it looks funny." After a year in their long-term fleet, Motor Trend stated "the Ridgeline has ultimately made a few converts among our car-loving staff, some of whom would never consider themselves fans of anything with a pickup bed." They wrapped up their long-term review by stating that whatever their next long-term vehicle is, "it's likely not to be as versatile as the Ridgeline. We'll miss this urban-suburban and mountain Swiss Army knife for sure." Others in the automotive press, such as The Driver's Seat TV, had similar views and also call the Ridgeline, "the Swiss Army knife of trucks." They also called the Ridgeline "the anti-truck"—due to Honda's lack of following the rules—and summarized their view by saying "the Ridgeline scores high on practicality but very low on image."

According to the Chicago Sun-Times, "Since its March [2005] debut, Honda's first pickup for the US market is slow to gain traction. Nissan's full-size Titan pickup also has fallen short of sales targets in this all-American segment, which...is proving tough for outsiders to crack." According to Bloomberg Business, early slow sales can partly be attributed to the expense of the vehicle, which some considered "over-priced." Consequently, dealers began to discount the truck and sales increased. Additionally, Honda gave the Ridgeline a facelift for 2009 and again in 2012, but sales remained "lackluster," according to AutoBlog.com. During the time period of the Great Recession, Automobile Magazine wrote that Ridgeline sales "dropped by half from 2008 to 2010 and then fell another 40%" in 2011, possibly due, in part, to parts shortages created by the 2011 Tōhoku earthquake and tsunami. Soon after, Honda posted "an open letter from the company's head of truck product planning, denying rumors that the Ridgeline would be dropped and insisting that a pickup truck will remain part of the company's portfolio."

First generation Honda Ridgeline sales and production
Calendar year	Sales		Production
Calendar year	USA	CAN	Production
2004			199
2005	42,593	3,512	60,679
2006	50,193	4,988	56,866
2007	42,795	4,519	55,150
2008	33,875	3,987	25,264
2009	16,464	3,546	16,180
2010	16,142	3,200	20,180
2011	9,759	1,713	13,356
2012	14,068	2,226	21,361
2013	17,723	2,122	19,557
2014	13,389	1,803	10,015
2015	520	229	154
2016	3	8	
Total sold in USA and CAN= 289,377 Other countries/miscellaneous= 9,585 Total production= 298,962

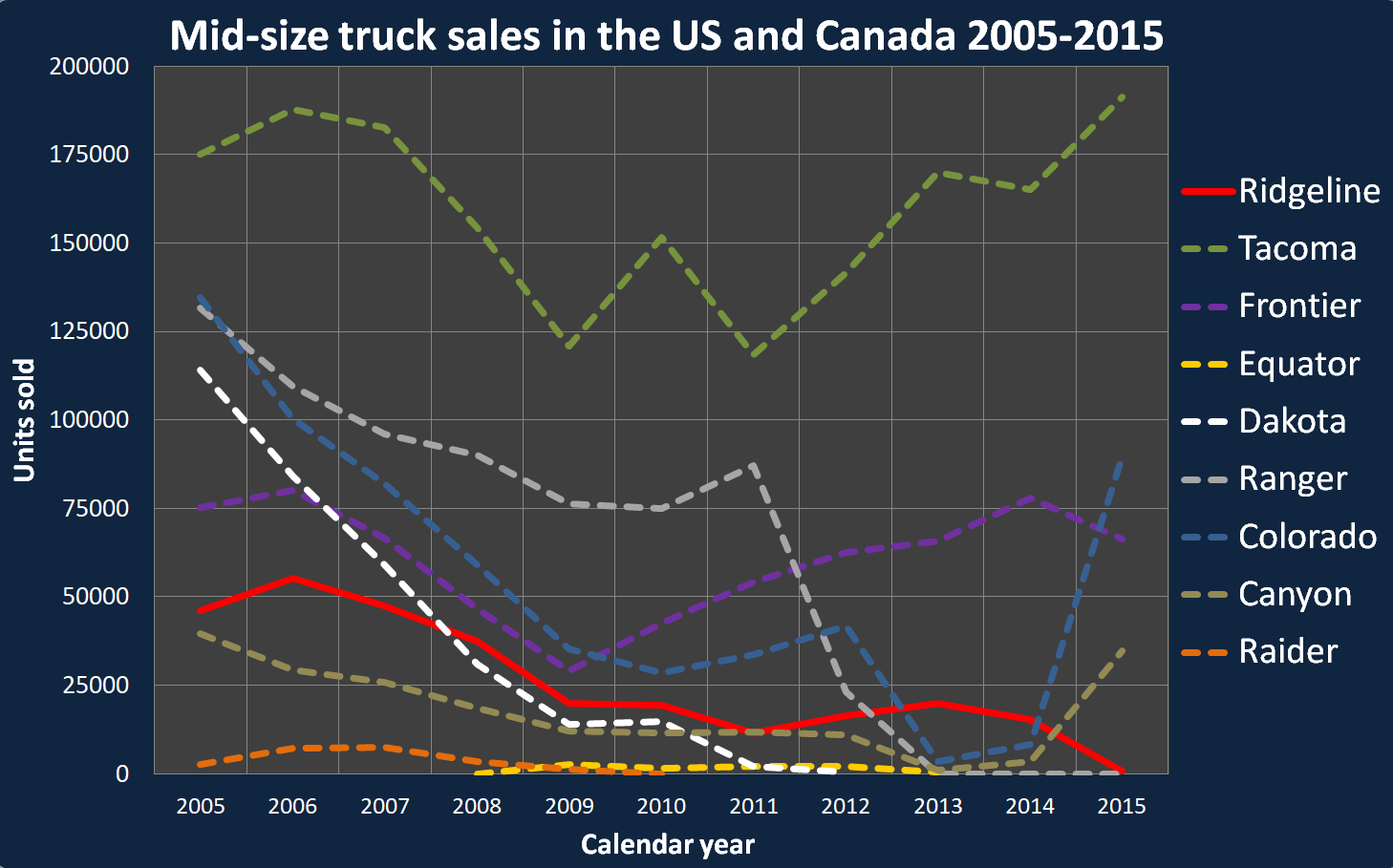

The first generation Ridgeline ended production in early 2015. According to Auto Trader, the automaker planned to continue production until the second generation Ridgeline was introduced; however, "slow sales of the truck have prompted the automaker to pull it sooner than expected." Despite this, the Ridgeline was one of Honda's more profitable vehicles due in large part to the company's frugal nature that allowed them to develop and deploy the Ridgeline for under $250 million (USD), half of what General Motors would normally invest.

== Gallery ==
First generation Honda Ridgeline
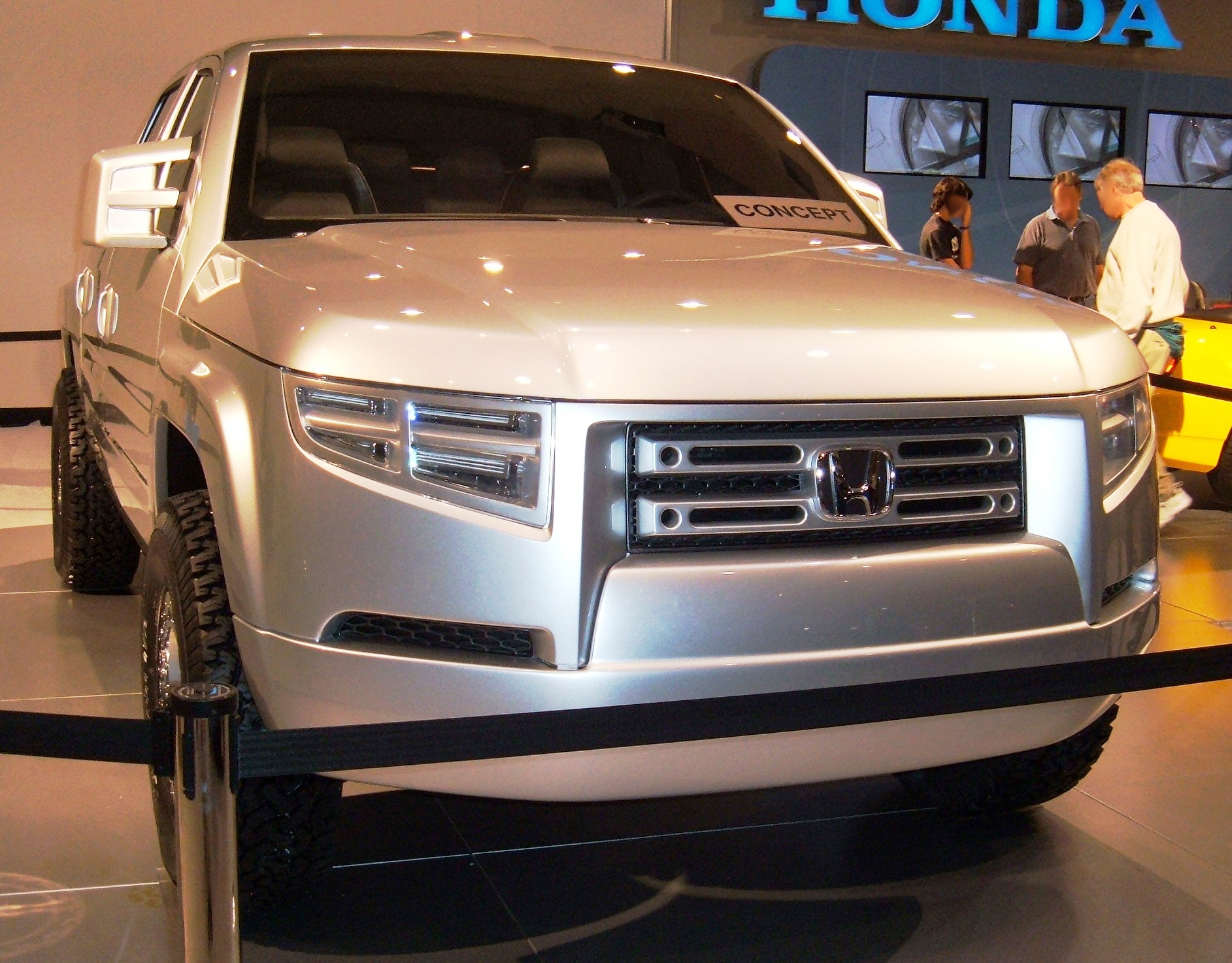
Honda's Sport Utility Concept #2, as shown at the 2004 San Francisco International Auto Show

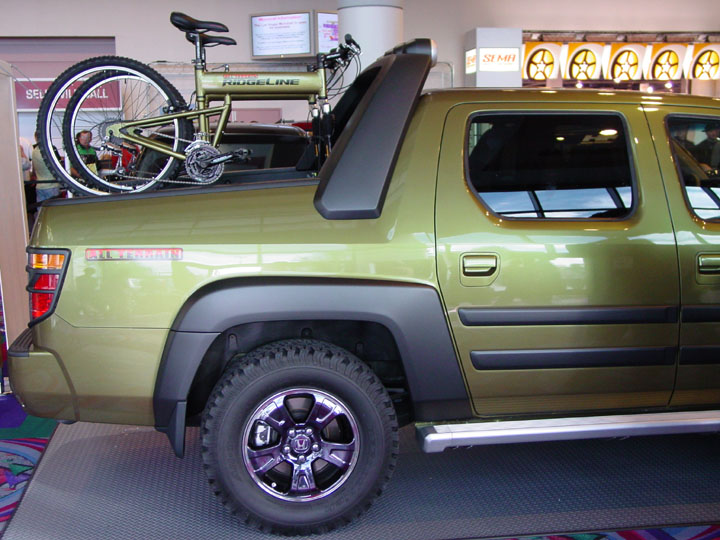
2006 Ridgeline with prototype OEM accessories on display at the 2005 SEMA Show

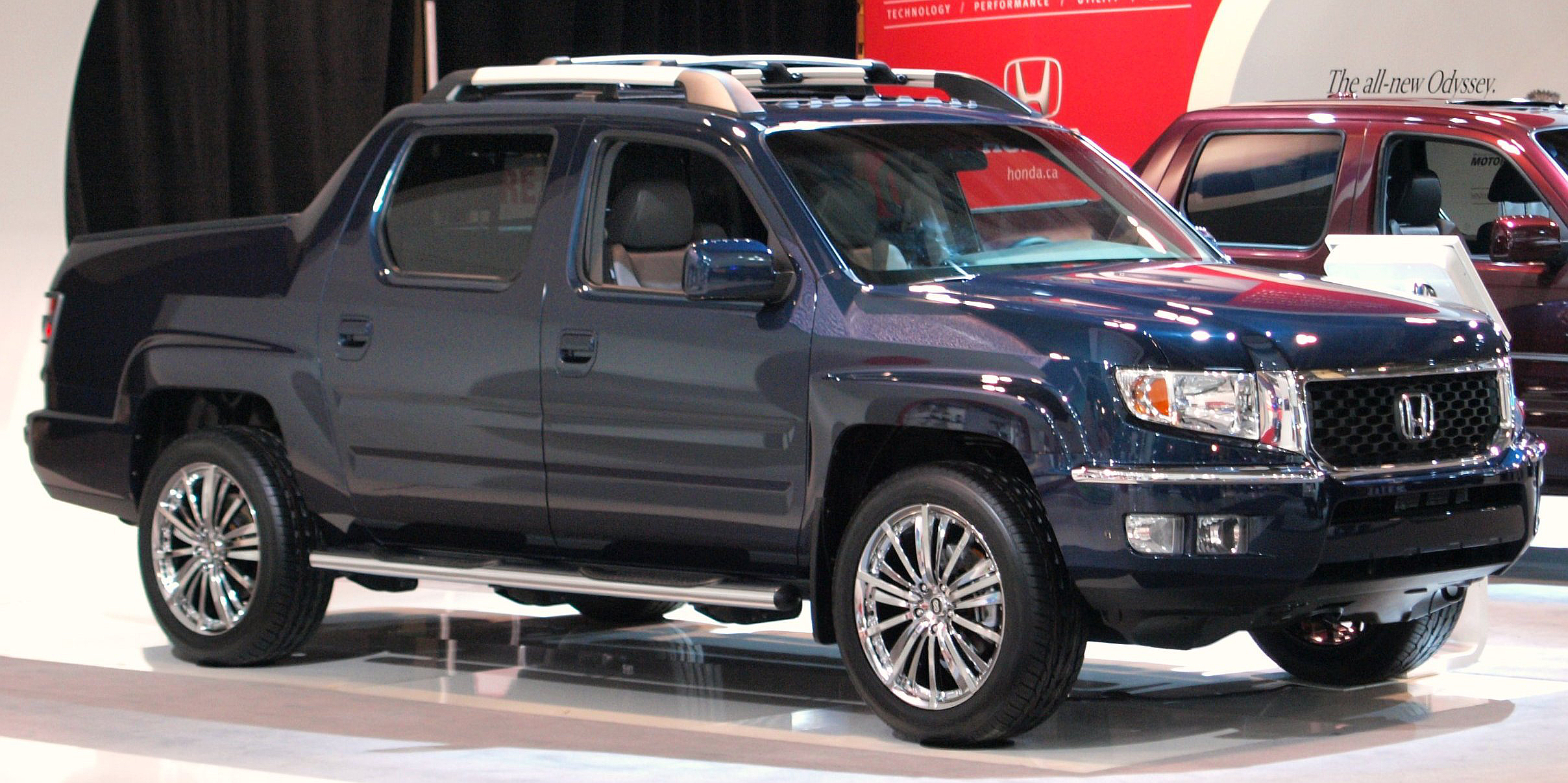
2011 Ridgeline EX–L with OEM accessory sport grille, chrome bumper trim, chrome side steps, body side protectors, taillight garnish, roof rack, and aftermarket rims (Canadian model)

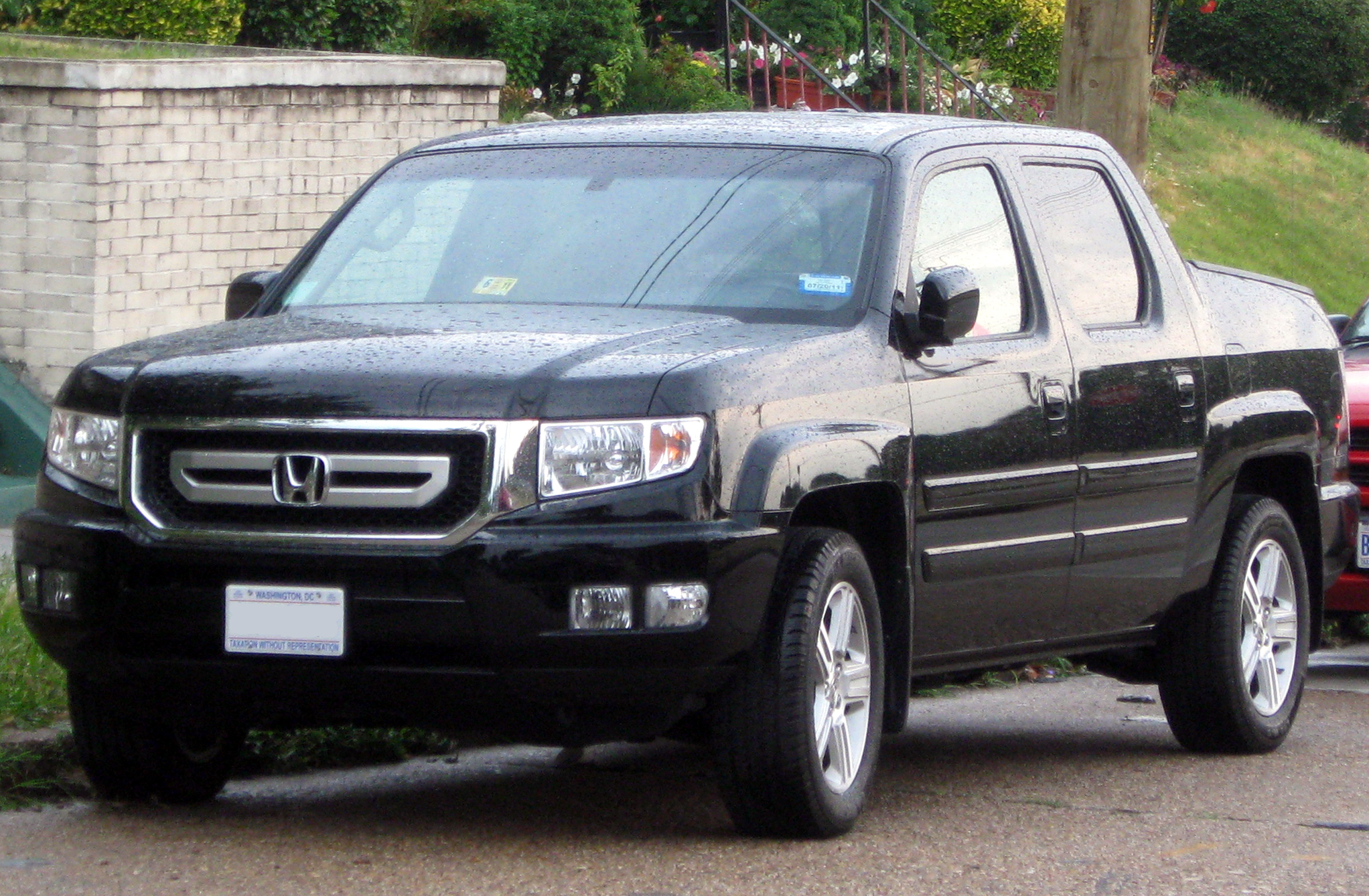
2011 Ridgeline RTL

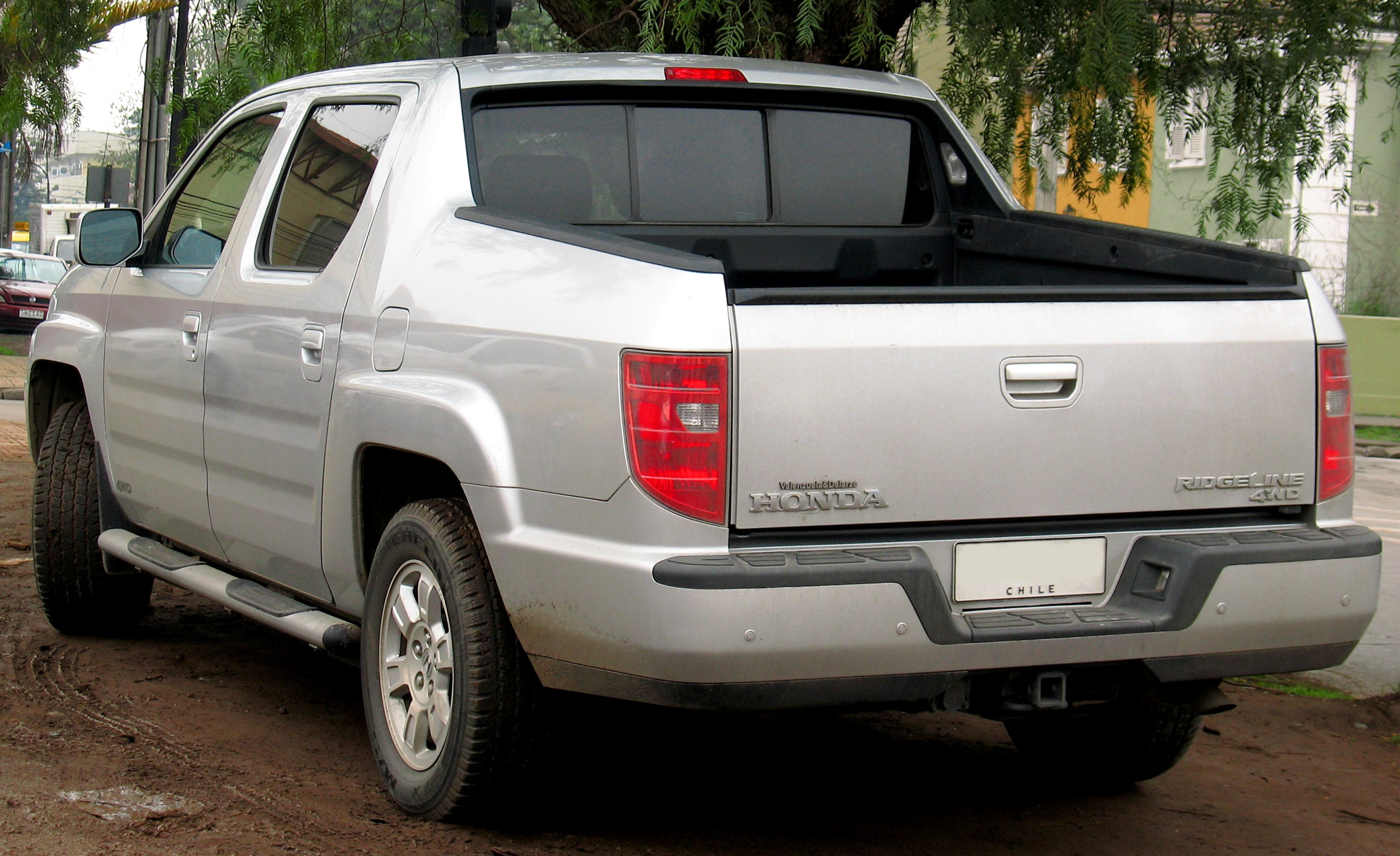
2011 Ridgeline RTL, with OEM accessory side-steps and backup sensors (Chilean model)

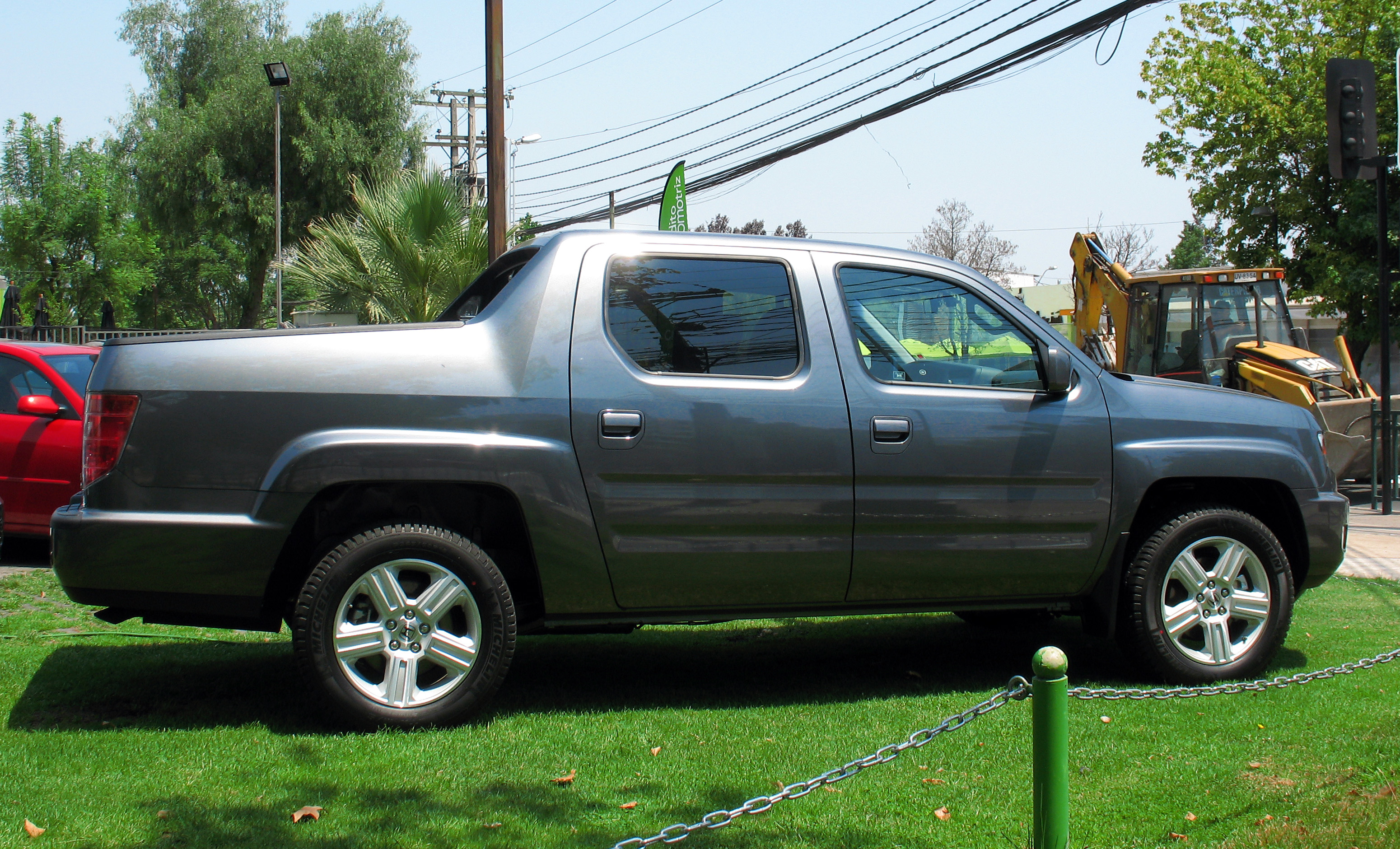
2010 Ridgeline RTL, unladen

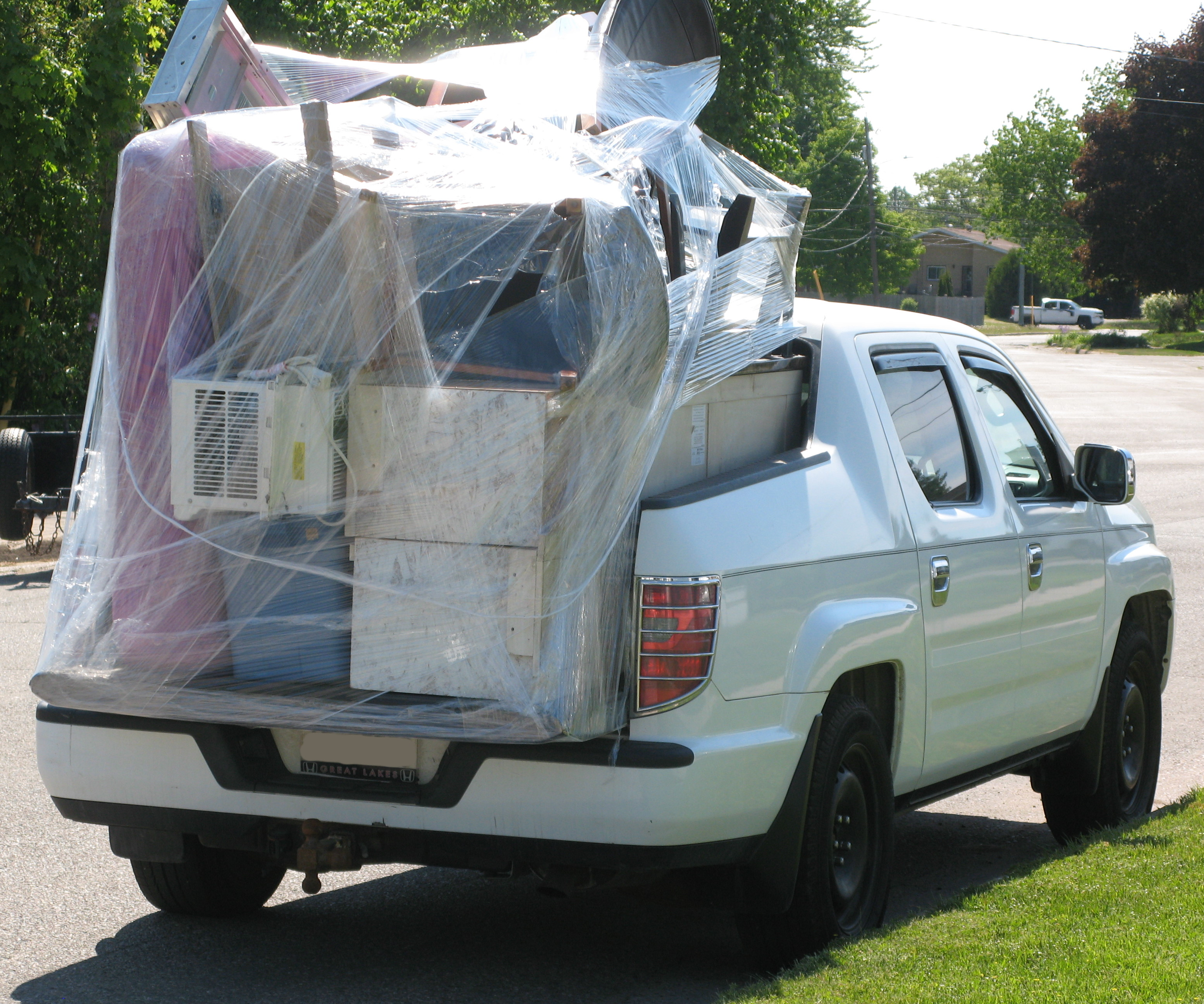
2011 Ridgeline hauling cargo in the extended bed (tailgate down) with aftermarket exterior accessories (Canadian model)

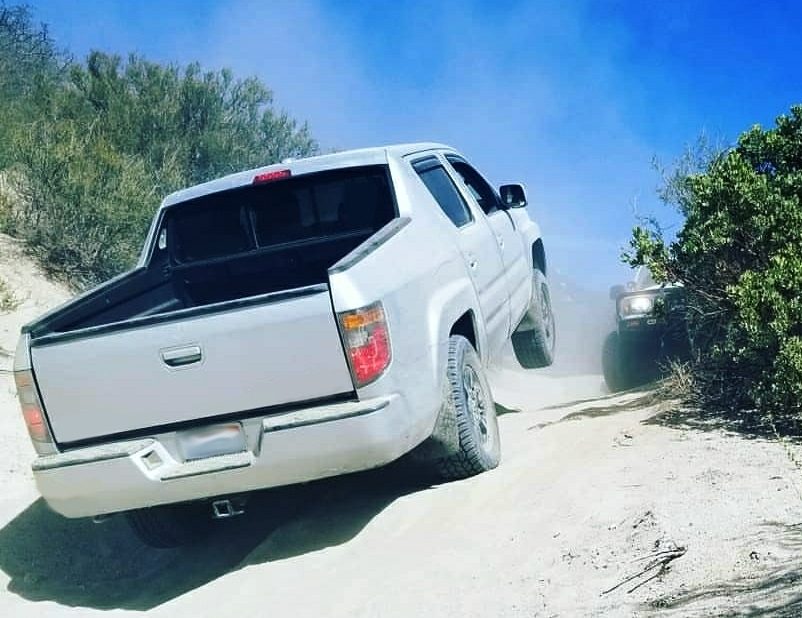
2006 Ridgeline RTL with all-terrain tires climbing steep hill off-road

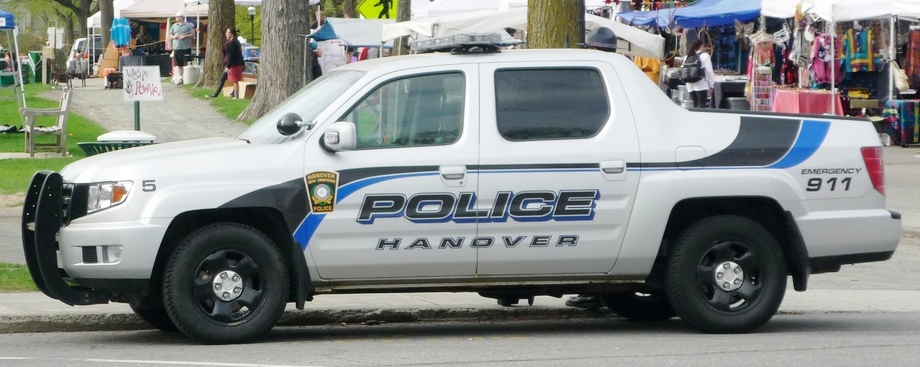
Custom 2009 Ridgeline RTS, used by the Hanover, New Hampshire police department as a police cruiser

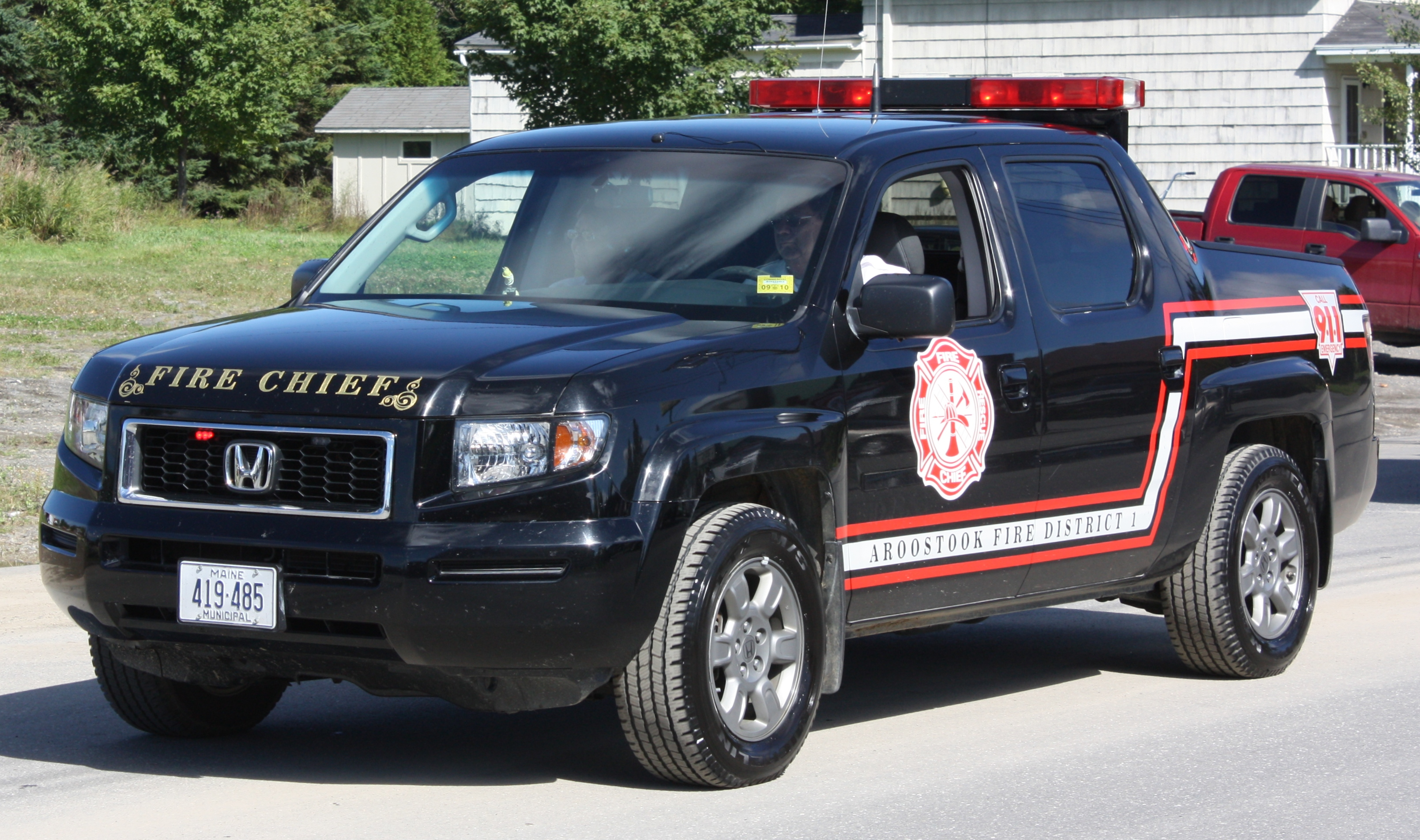
Custom 2007 Ridgeline RTX, used by the Aroostook County (Maine) Fire District 1 as "Chief 1" emergency response vehicle

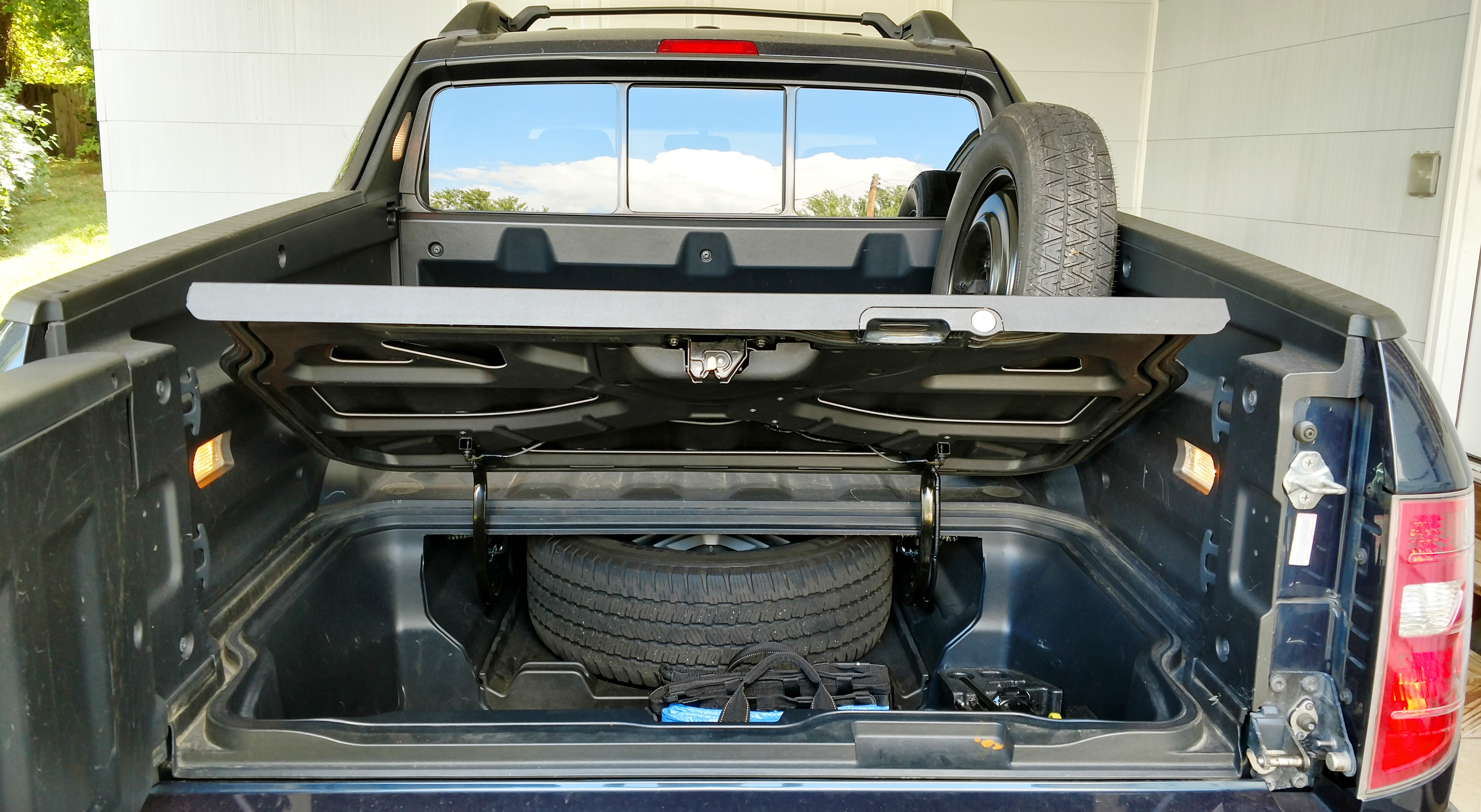
2009 Ridgeline RTL with full-size spare in spare tire service tray and temporary tire mounted on OEM bed wall mount

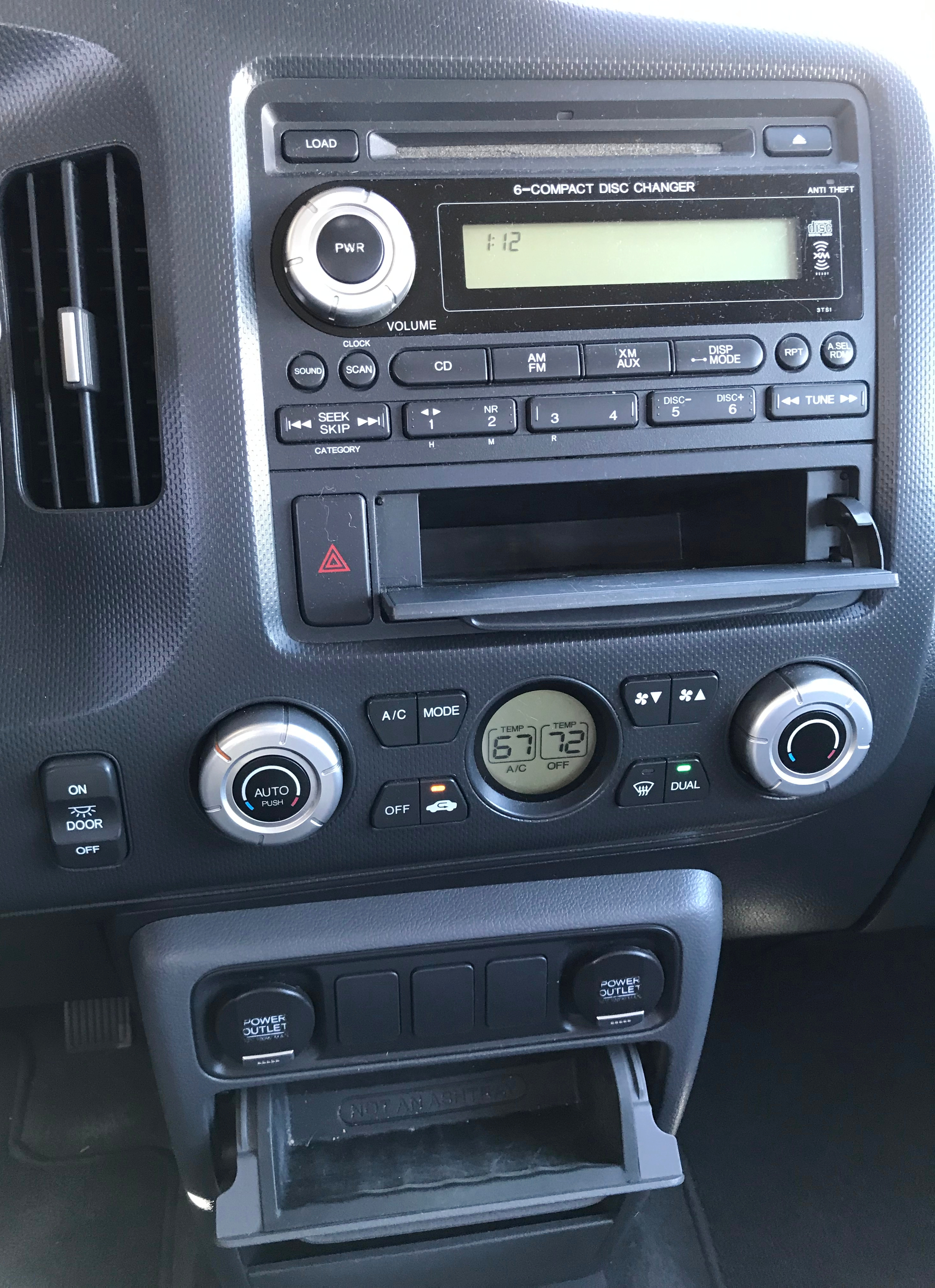
2006 Ridgeline RTS center dash with six–disc head unit, storage compartments, dual-zone climate controls, and power outlets

== Awards ==
- North American Car, Utility, and Truck of the Year for 2006
- Canadian Car of the Year and Best New Pickup for 2006
- Motor Trend 2006 Truck of the Year
- Car and Driver #1 mid-size truck for 2006,
- Autobytel 2006 Truck of the Year
- Sobre Ruedas ("On Wheels," a Latin American automotive magazine) 2005 Best Pick-up Truck
- J.D. Power and Associates Automotive Performance, Execution, And Layout (APEAL) Award for 2006–2008
- Popular Mechanics 2006 Automotive Excellence Award for functionality
- Society of Plastics Engineers 2006 Grand Award for the composite in-bed trunk
- NHTSA first four-door pickup to earn five-star safety rating
- IIHS Top Safety Pick award for 2009, 2012, and 2013
- SCORE Baja off-road race winner in the Stock Mini Class in 2008 and 2010
