= List of Honda transmissions =

Honda has long built nearly all of its own automobile transmissions, unlike many other automobile manufacturers which often source transmissions from external sources. The most notable exception was in 2014, when Honda decided to forgo an in-house designed transmission and chose the ZF 9HP transmission for their Acura TLX V6 model, later extending the offering of the ZF transmission to the Acura MDX, Odyssey, Pilot and Ridgeline. However, there have been reports of problems with ZF transmissions and Acura recalled its 2015 TLX models. ZF has attributed most of these problems to software issues.

== Automatic/Semi-automatic transmissions ==
Most of Honda's automatic transmissions are unusual in that they do not use planetary gears like nearly all other makers, however, Honda has recently introduced (2017) an all-new, in-house designed 10-speed automatic that uses planetary gears. Honda's older transmissions such as the Hondamatic semi-automatic transmission and its successors use traditional, individual gears on parallel axes like a manual transmission, with each gear ratio engaged by a separate hydraulic clutch pack. This design is also noteworthy because it preserves engine braking by eliminating a sprag between first and second gears. Instead of a sprag or roller clutch, Honda's older transmissions rely on pressure circuits to modulate line pressure to change gears.

Honda was forced to invent their new system due to the vast array of patents on automatic transmission technology held by BorgWarner and others.

Honda initially chose to integrate the transmission and engine block for its first application (in the N600) as in the Mini. The Hondamatic incorporated a lockup function, which Honda called a third ratio, and had manual gear selection. The company's early transmissions also used a patented torque converter which used stator force to reduce hydraulic losses by using a reaction arm to increase the hydraulic pressure when the stator was stalled. The reaction arm acted directly on the regulator valve; this meant that increased pressure was available to the clutch plates when torque multiplication was greatest. The stator was equipped with a sprag clutch enabling it to freewheel when required. The N360/N600 controlled gear changes by balancing a throttle valve and a centrifugal valve. These "opposing" pressures caused the gear changes through the free-floating gear change valves.

On October 18, 1967, the N360 AT model with the lock-up function was unveiled at the London Auto Show.(ref Honda Worldwide) It is not now clear if the lockup function made it into production; it was not fitted to the N600AT for Europe.

The typical torque converter of the time was about 11.5in. long and the torque multiplication ratio was about 1.5 to 1. The N360/N600 torque converter was about 5.5in. long and achieved a torque multiplication of over 2.2 to 1.

The first Civic was equipped with a manually changed hydraulically engaged two-speed transmission with a torque converter. This torque converter was nominally about 7in. and achieved a torque multiplication of c2.7 to 1. It also used the reaction arm on the stator as in the N360/N600 to increase hydraulic pressure. It was initially announced in Europe as an automatic as the staff at Honda in Europe assumed that it would like the N600 to be fully automatic. This was quickly changed to "Hondamatic". This gearbox was a separate unit and used ATF - Automatic Transmission Fluid.

The company's naming scheme is also confusing, as it is specific to a single model of the vehicle and some identifiers are reused. Below is a list of Honda automatic transmissions:

- 1973–1979 H2 — 2-speed
  - Honda Civic, Honda Accord, Honda Prelude
- 1979–1985 H3 — 3-speed
  - Honda Civic, Honda Accord, Honda Prelude, Honda CRX, Triumph Acclaim
- 1983–1991 H4 — 4-speed (a.k.a. AS/AK/F4/CA/P1/K4/L4/PY8A/ML4A/MY8A)
  - Honda Civic, Honda Accord, Honda Prelude, Honda CRX, Honda/Acura Integra
- 1986–1990 G4 — 4-speed (a.k.a. L5/PL5X)
  - Honda/Acura Legend
- 1989–1991 Civic AWD — 4-speed (a.k.a. MPSA/S5)
  - Honda Civic AWD
- 1990–1997 — 4-speed (a.k.a. A6VA/AOYA/APX4/APXA/BOYA/MP1A/MP1B/MPJA/MPOA/MPWA/MPXA/PX4B)
  - Honda Accord, Honda Prelude, Honda Odyssey/Isuzu Oasis, Acura CL
- 1990–2000 Integra — 4-speed (a.k.a. MP7A/MPRA/RO/S4XA/SKWA/SP7A)
  - Acura Integra
- 1991–1998 Vigor — 4-speed (a.k.a. M1WA/MPWA)
  - Acura Vigor, Acura TL
- 1991–2003 MPYA — 4-speed (a.k.a. MPYA/M5DA/M5HA/MPYA)
  - Acura Legend, Acura TL, Acura RL
- 1992–2004 S24A — 4-speed (also A24A/A2YA/A4RA/B46A/B4RA/B7ZA/BDRA/BMXA/M24A/M4RA/M4TA/MCVA/MDLA/MDMA/MRVA/S4RA/SLXA)
  - Civic, del Sol, CR-V (until 2001)
- 1995–2002 B7XA — 4-speed (a.k.a. B7TA/B7VA/B7YA/M7ZA/MPZA)
  - Honda Accord, Acura CL, Honda Odyssey/Isuzu Oasis, Acura TL
- 2003–2006(some 2007) MZKA — 4-speed, FWD & AWD (a.k.a. BZKA for FWD, MZKA for AWD)
  - Honda Element
- 2007–2011 MNZA — 5-speed, FWD & AWD (a.k.a. BZNA for AWD, MNZA for FWD)
  - Honda Element
- 1996–2003 Multimatic — CVT (also M4VA/MLYA/SLYA)
  - Honda Civic HX CVT, Honda City
- 1997–2002 M6HA — 4-speed (also B6VA/BAXA/MAXA/MDWA/MGRA)
  - Honda Prelude, Acura CL, Honda Accord, Honda Odyssey/Isuzu Oasis
- 2000–2013 H5 — 5-speed (also B7WA/BAYA/BCLA/BGFA/BGHA/BYBA/BWEA/M7WA/MAYA/MCLA/MDKA/MGFA/MGHA/MRMA)
  - Acura TL, Acura CL, Acura MDX, Acura RSX, Acura RDX, Honda Odyssey, Honda Accord, Saturn Vue, Honda Ridgeline (2006–2014)
- 2010– H6 — 6-speed BYKA (also MT4A/M7PA/M8EA/MMHA/MMGA)
  - Acura MDX (2010–14), Acura ZDX, Acura RL (2011–2012), Acura TL (2012–2014), Acura RDX (2nd Gen), Acura RLX (non-hybrid, 2014–2017), Honda Pilot (2016–2020), Honda Ridgeline (2017–2019), Honda Odyssey (2011–2017), Honda Accord (2014-2019 v6), Honda Crosstour (2013-2015 v6)
- 2012–2014 B5RA — 5-speed (also M5LA)
  - CR-V 4WD
- 2014– ZF 9HP transmission — 9-speed
  - Acura TLX (V6), Honda Pilot (effective 2016 in some trims), Honda Odyssey, Acura MDX, Honda Passport, Honda Ridgeline (2020–present), Honda CR-V i-DTEC (Diesel Engine), Honda Civic i-DTEC (Diesel Engine)
- 2017– Honda 10-speed automatic — 10-speed with Sequential SportShift Paddle Shifters
  - Honda Odyssey, Honda Accord 2.0T, Acura RDX (3rd Gen), Acura TLX (2nd Gen), Acura RLX (non-hybrid, 2018–2020), Acura MDX (4th Gen)

== Dual-clutch transmission ==
- 2014– 8DCT 8-speed dual clutch automatic transmission with torque converter
  - Acura TLX (I4), Acura ILX, Acura CDX, Honda Spirior (2.4L)
- 2014– 7-speed dual clutch Sequential SportShift hybrid-integrated automatic transmission (Heavy Duty)
  - Acura RLX (Hybrid), Acura MDX (Hybrid)
- 2015– 7-speed dual clutch hybrid integrated automatic transmission (Light Duty)
  - Honda Fit/Fit Shuttle Hybrid (2015-2020), Honda Freed (Second Generation), Acura CDX, Honda Vezel Hybrid
- 2016– 9-speed dual clutch automatic transmission
  - Acura NSX/Honda NSX

== Continuously Variable Transmissions ==
- MultiMatic CVT (1996)– Uses a starter clutch and a high "first" gear.
  - 1996-2000 Honda Civic HX
  - 2001-2005 Honda Civic HX
  - Honda Fit (first generation, JDM)
  - 1999 Honda Insight (Paired with IMA hybrid system)
  - 2003 Honda Civic Hybrid
- IMA Hybrid CVT (2006)– 9% wider spread than its predecessor with greater durability
  - 2006-2011 Honda Civic Hybrid
  - 2010-2013 Honda Fit Hybrid
  - 2012-2015 Honda Civic Hybrid
  - Honda Freed Hybrid
  - 2012-2013 Acura ILX Hybrid
  - Honda Insight (second generation)
- Honda EarthDreams CVT (2013)– first introduced in the 9th generation Accord 4 cylinder, now used in virtually all gasoline Hondas.
  - 2013- Honda Accord
  - 2014- Honda Civic
  - 2015-2020 Honda Fit
  - 2015-2016 Honda CR-V (select markets)
  - 2017- Honda CR-V
  - 2023- Acura Integra
  - 2025- Acura ADX

== Manual transmissions ==
- 1979-1982 GK — 5-speed
  - Honda Prelude 1.8
- 1986-1987 A2K5/A2K6 — 5-speed
  - Honda Prelude 2.0 Si
- 1986 A1B2
  - Honda Prelude DX Carb
- 1986-1987 A2Q5 — 5-speed
  - Honda Accord FI
- 1986-1987 A2Q6 — 5-speed
  - Honda Accord carb
- 1988 E2Q5 — 5-speed
  - Honda Accord FI
- 1988 E2Q6 — 5-speed
  - Honda Accord carb
- 1988-1991 L3 — 5-speed
  - Honda Civic
  - Honda CRX
- 1988-1989 D2J5 — 5-speed
  - Honda Prelude Si
- 1989 E2R5 — 5-speed
  - Honda Accord FI
- 1989 E2R6 — 5-speed
  - Honda Accord carb
- 1990-1991 D2A4 — 5-speed
  - Honda Prelude 2.0Si, Si, SR
- 1992-1995 S20 A000 — 5-speed
  - Honda Civic CX, VX
- 1993 — 6-speed
  - Honda/Acura Legend (Second Generation)
    - 1—3.250
    - 2—1.761
    - 3—1.066
    - 4—0.852
    - 5—0.702
    - R—3.153
  - Honda Civic DX, LX
    - 1—3.250
    - 2—1.761
    - 3—1.172
    - 4—0.909
    - 5—0.702
    - R—3.153
- 1992-1995 S20 B000 — 5-speed
  - Honda Civic EX, Si
    - 1—3.250
    - 2—1.900
    - 3—1.250
    - 4—0.909
    - 5—0.702
    - R—3.153
- 1996-2006 SEV — 5-speed?
  - Honda HR-V
- 1997 S8G — 5-speed
  - Honda Integra (Japanese Domestic Market, ZC)
  - Honda CR-X del Sol Si & ESi (late model with D16Y8 engine)
- 1997-1999 S20 B000 — 5-speed
  - Honda Civic coupe EX
- 1998 S40 (E5F and P4A may be casting codes) — 5-speed
  - Honda Civic LX
- 2003 YZC6 — 6-speed
  - Acura CL Type-S
  - Acura TL Type-S
- 2004-2007 ATC6 — 6-speed
  - Honda Accord 3.0L
- 2007-2008 SMJM — 5-speed
  - Honda Fit
- 2009-2014 SP4M — 5-speed
  - Honda Fit
- 2015-2017 S7A7 — 6-speed
  - Acura ILX
  - Honda Fit
  - Accord Sport
