= Honda G4 transmission =

G4

Overview
- Manufacturer: Honda
- Production: 1986–1990

Body and chassis
- Class: 4-speed transverse automatic transmission

Chronology
- Successor: MPYA

The G4 was a strengthened version of Honda's first 4-speed automatic transmission, the H4. Introduced in 1986 on the new flagship Honda/Acura Legend, it was replaced by the updated MPYA.

Applications:

- 1986–1987 Acura Legend (G4)
- 1988–1989 Acura Legend (L5)
- 1990 Acura Legend (PL5X)

== See also ==
- List of Honda transmissions
