= Honda CM450A =

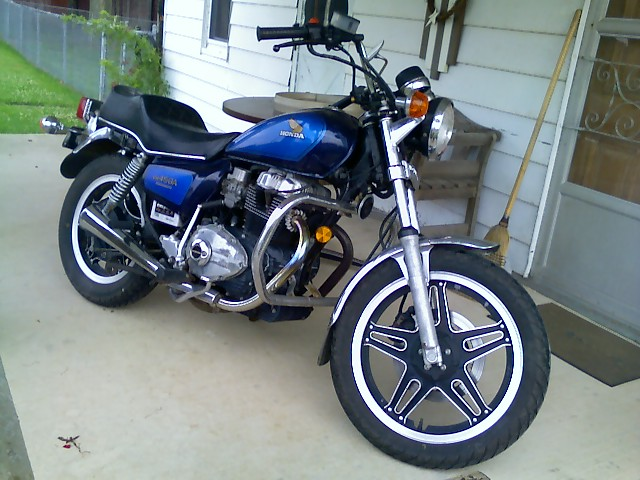
- 1982 CM450A Hondamatic
- Manufacturer: Honda
- Production: 1982–1983
- Class: Standard
- Engine: 447 cc (27.3 cu in), four-stroke, SOHC, parallel-twin
- Ignition type: Electric and kick start
- Brakes: Front: disc Rear: drum

The Honda CM450A is a motorcycle made by Honda in 1982 and 1983. It was based on the CB400 and CM400 models (1978–1981), especially the CM400A Hondamatic (1980–1981). It had a 447 cc (27.3 cu in) SOHC parallel twin engine with two carburetors and a two-speed transmission with a torque converter. It was not a full automatic, however, because the rider had to manually shift between low and high. It is called automatic because there is no clutch required due to the torque converter, and shared the Hondamatic trade name with Honda cars that had true automatic transmissions. The chain-driven CM450A had a top speed of 90 miles per hour (140 km/h) and weighed 413 pounds (187 kg). Both models had a front disc brake and a rear drum brake. The suspension consisted of two shock absorbers at the rear and telescoping shock-absorbing front forks. The fuel tank had a 3.4 US gallons (13 L; 2.8 imp gal) capacity. The exhaust was routed through a separate pipe and baffle on each side of the motorcycle, although both exhaust pipes shared a plenum under the motor. It had an electric start with a kick start as well.
