= Hondamatic =

Automatic transmission

H2

Overview
- Manufacturer: Honda
- Production: 1973–1988

Body and chassis
- Class: 2/3-speed transverse semi-automatic transmission

Chronology
- Successor: H3

See also list of Honda transmissions for other Hondamatics

The Hondamatic (also called the H2) was Honda's first semi-automatic transmission. It was produced from 1973 through 1988. The Hondamatic name continued to be used on fully-automatic transmissions from Honda.

== Design and Application ==
The original Hondamatic, like all following Honda automatics, featured gears on parallel axes rather than planetary gears like most other automatic transmissions. The two gears for each ratio - one driving and the other driven - are in constant mesh and each ratio is engaged by a dedicated clutch connected to one of the ratio's two gears. The clutches are hydraulically controlled, applying oil pressure to the desired "gear". Shifting between forward gears was done by simply sliding the gear selector (actually a hydraulic valve) from 1 to 2. It did not automatically shift, but because of the torque converter, could be driven entirely in second gear. The Honda automobile torque converter had a lockup, leading the company to sell the original Hondamatic (which had just two forward gear ratios) as a three-speed. The true three-speed H3 was launched in 1979. In 1982 Honda introduced a four-speed fully-automatic (called Hondamatic Full-Auto), followed by a fully-automatic three-speed in 1983. The semi-automatic version continued to be available in Honda's smaller cars, where it was gradually replaced by conventional automatics. With the 1988 remake of the Honda Acty/Street, the last Hondamatic was discontinued.

Applications:

- 1973–1983 Honda Civic
- 1976–1983 Honda Accord
- 1979–1982 Honda Prelude
- 1982–1986 Honda City AA
- 1982–1988 Honda Acty/Street

== History ==
Honda could not make a conventional planetary gearset automatic transmission without infringing on any patents. Honda eventually asked Borg-Warner to design a prototype transmission for their upcoming vehicles. However, Borg-Warner declined. This was due to Borg-Warner not having transmission specifications that were efficient enough for such a small engine like the 500cc Honda S500 and one that was able to be reliable at a maximum engine speed of 8000rpm. This led Honda to design its own transmission. They purchased a transmission from Borg-Warner for the purpose of developing an original transmission design. They tested their newly developed automatic transmission on the L700. When testing and refinements had been made, Honda sold their first automatic transmission in the N360.

== Motorcycle ==
The Hondamatic was later used in Honda's 400, 450 and 750 cc motorcycles. In this application, it was not a true automatic transmission, as the driver had to manually select one of the two gears. The transmission of the 750 Hondamatics incorporated two hydraulically controlled clutches (one for each gear), with the foot-operated gear selector operating the hydraulic valve. The 400/450 Hondamatics, however, have no clutches at all. The foot-operated gear selector physically moves a gear with "dogs" to change gear engagement, the same as on a non-Hondamatic motorcycle transmission.

Applications:

- CB750A (1976–1978)
- CB400A Hawk Hondamatic (1978-1980)
- CM400A Hondamatic (1979–1981)
- CM450A Hondamatic (1982–1983)

== Scooter, ATV, and power equipment ==
Honda also applies the Hondamatic name to a hydraulic piston-based continuously variable transmission used in motorscooters, all-terrain vehicles, and other types of power equipment.

The principle is that of a continuously variable transmission. There is a common notion that this transmission gave rise to the "Hondamatic"—the automatic gearbox found on the brand’s motorcycles in the 1970s. However, the account published by Honda itself tells a different story. The mechanism was not an in-house invention; rather, Honda purchased the patent rights from the Italian inventor Giovanni Badalini—who had filed a patent for his continuously variable system in 1957—and subsequently refined it for use in the M80 and M85 Honda models.

Applications

- TRX500FA (2001–2011)
- TRX400FA (2004–2007)

== See also ==
- List of Honda transmissions
