= Honda C engine =

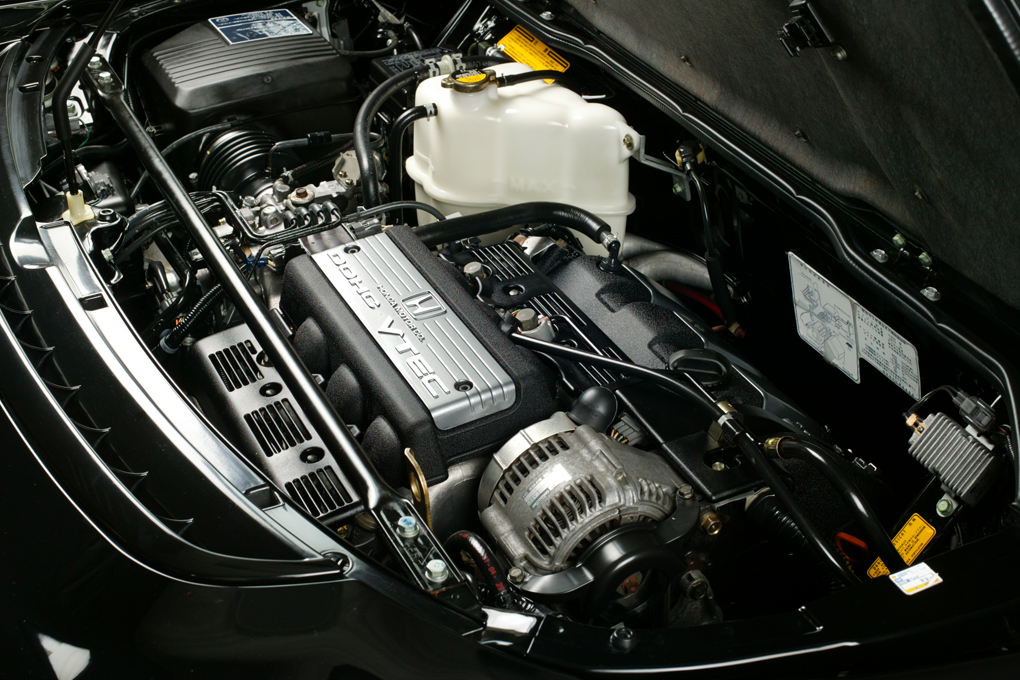

Overview
- Manufacturer: Honda
- Production: 1985–2005

Layout
- Configuration: 90° V6
- Displacement: 2.0 L (1,996 cc); 2.5 L (2,494 cc); 2.7 L (2,675 cc); 3.0 L (2,977 cc); 3.2 L (3,179 cc); 3.5 L (3,473 cc)
- Cylinder bore: 82 mm (3.23 in); 84 mm (3.31 in); 87 mm (3.43 in); 90 mm (3.54 in); 93 mm (3.66 in)
- Piston stroke: 63 mm (2.48 in); 75 mm (2.95 in); 78 mm (3.07 in); 91 mm (3.58 in)
- Cylinder block material: Aluminum
- Cylinder head material: Aluminum
- Valvetrain: SOHC & DOHC 4 valves x cyl. (VTEC only in DOHC engines)
- Compression ratio: 9.0:1, 9.6:1, 10.2:1

Combustion
- Turbocharger: Variable geometry (some versions)
- Fuel system: Fuel injection
- Management: Electronic Control Unit
- Fuel type: Gasoline
- Cooling system: Water-cooled

Output
- Power output: 145–294 PS (107–216 kW; 143–290 bhp)
- Torque output: 167–314 N⋅m; 123–231 lbf⋅ft (17–32 kg⋅m)

Chronology
- Successor: Honda J engine

Honda's first production V6 was the C series; it was produced in displacements from 2.0 to 3.5 liters. The C engine was produced in various forms for over 20 years (1985–2005), having first been used in the KA series Legend model, and its British sister car the Rover 800-series (and Sterling). It was the second mass-produced Japanese V6 engine, introduced two years after the Nissan VG engine.

All C engines share in common a 90-degree V-angle from bank to bank, common cylinder block bore centers, and four valves per cylinder. It is an all-aluminum design, and uses timing belt-driven single or dual overhead camshafts; the water pump is also driven by the timing belt.

All C engines use an interference design; if the timing belt fails, any open valves will clash into the pistons, and severe engine damage will occur.

The engine family can be broken down into three sub families:

- C20A, C20AT, C25A and C27A (transversely mounted)
- C30A and C32B (transversely mounted rear)
- C32A, C35A, and C35B (one-off) (longitudinally mounted)

As a general rule, interchange of parts will not work between these sub groups.

== C20A ==
SOHC 1,996 cc (2.0 L)

- 145 PS (107 kW; 143 hp) at 6,500 rpm
- 167 N⋅m; 123 lbf⋅ft (17 kg⋅m) at 5,500 rpm

Japan only;

- 1985–1988 Honda Legend
- Experimental HP-X (Honda Pininfarina Xperimental) (used a DOHC version of the C20A)

The variable length intake manifold used six individual small-bore intake runners below 3,500 rpm for each cylinder and added an additional six individual larger bore intake runners at higher RPMs.

The C20AT was a turbocharged version, called the "Wing Turbo", producing 188 bhp (140 kW; 191 PS) and 241 N⋅m; 178 lbf⋅ft (24.6 kg⋅m).

Japan only:

- 1989 Honda Legend

Honda replaced the variable length intake manifold with a variable geometry turbocharger to the C20A engine used in the Japanese Domestic Market Legend. The turbo with intercooler-equipped engine was the C20AT engine and are extremely rare. Honda pioneered variable-geometry turbo chargers. The "Wing Turbo", as Honda called them, were controlled by an 8-bit processor ECU and they were constantly adjusting. Basically, at low speeds the wings surrounding the turbine wheel inside the compressor housing on the intake side would be nearly closed to speed and direct exhaust pressure precisely on the turbine wheel. At 2000 rpm, the wings would fluctuate and it would act like a much larger turbo to increase fuel economy as needed. This car was quick and powerful, but the price premium over the slightly longer and wider Legend with the 2.7 L (2,675 cc) naturally aspirated V6 was too much for most, so the car disappeared. This was one of the only production Hondas ever turbocharged from the factory (excluding turbo engines of kei car for the Japan domestic market), along with the K23A1 straight-4 engine used in the Acura RDX and the ER straight-4 engine used in the first generation Honda City until model year 2017, when most of their model lines had the option of the 1.5L turbocharged engine.

== C25A ==
SOHC (2.5 L) V6 24 valves, 9.0:1 compression

Japan

- 165 PS (121 kW; 163 hp) at 6,000 rpm
- 211 N⋅m; 156 lbf⋅ft (21.5 kg⋅m) at 4,500 rpm

North America

- 151 bhp (113 kW; 153 PS) at 5,800 rpm
- 213 N⋅m; 157 lbf⋅ft (21.7 kg⋅m) at 4,500 rpm

Applications:

- 1985–1987 Honda Legend
- 1986–1987 Acura Legend
- 1986–1988 Rover 825
- 1987–1988 Sterling 825i

The engine utilized a 90 degree V-angle to the crankshaft in preference to the taller but more common 60 degree design, with a compression ratio of 9.0:1. The crankshaft had crankpins offset 30 degrees to provide a low profile engine that fires smoothly and evenly. The block and cross flow pent roof cylinder heads with 24 valves are die-cast from aluminum alloy and the cylinder bores are lined with cast iron. The exhaust system uses equal length exhaust pipes connected to the Exhaust manifold to minimize scavenging resistance and maximum total exhaust efficiency. An external high capacity water cooled oil cooler and filter maintain an efficient oil temperature.

== C27A ==
The SOHC C27A is a 2.7 L version, with the major upgrade being the addition of a variable length intake manifold, producing up to 132 kW (179 PS; 177 bhp)

Applications; non-North America:

- C27A2 - 1988–1990 Honda Legend Coupe, 176 bhp (131 kW; 178 PS) (non catalyst) UK and Europe
- C27A2 - 1988–1990 Honda Legend Saloon, 176 bhp (131 kW; 178 PS) (non catalyst) UK and Europe
- C27A2 - 1987–1991 Rover 827/Sterling/Vitesse, 177 bhp (132 kW; 179 PS) (non catalyst) UK and Europe
- C27A1 - 1991 Rover 827/Sterling/Vitesse, 168 bhp (125 kW; 170 PS) (catalyst) UK and Europe
- C27A1 - 1991–1995 Rover 827/Sterling/Coupe, 168 bhp (125 kW; 170 PS) (catalyst) UK and Europe

Applications; North America:

- C27A1 - 1987–1990 Acura Legend Coupe, 161 bhp (120 kW; 163 PS) (catalyst)
- C27A1 - 1988–1990 Acura Legend, 161 bhp (120 kW; 163 PS) (catalyst)
- C27A1 - 1988–1991 Sterling 827, 168 bhp (125 kW; 170 PS) (catalyst)
- C27A4 - 1995–1997 Honda Accord, 170 bhp (127 kW; 172 PS) (catalyst) For this particular vehicle the engine was updated with a more efficient intake manifold.

== C30A ==
The DOHC VTEC C30A is a 2,977 cc (3.0 L) version, producing 270 bhp (274 PS; 201 kW) at 7,300 rpm and 284 N⋅m; 210 lbf⋅ft (29 kg⋅m) of torque at 6,500 rpm, with a 10.2:1 compression ratio. The engine has a bore and stroke of 90mm x 78mm, making the engine highly over square, which facilitates a shift in power to the higher end of the rpm range. It utilizes a crankshaft with offset crankpins to achieve an evenly spaced firing interval of 120°, something typically unattainable with a 90° cylinder bank angle. Honda selected the 90° V6 as the NSX's optimal engine choice, striking a balance between packaging, complexity, and lowering the car's center of gravity. The engine was the second Honda engine ever to utilize Honda's proprietary VTEC variable valve timing system in an automotive application after the B16A, which adjusts cam lift depending on engine RPM and throttle position. VTEC allows the C30A to produce a high maximum power level while maintaining a relatively flat torque curve. C30A was also equipped with Variable Volume Induction System (VVIS), which used a primary and a secondary intake plenum. Secondary intake plenum engages at 4800 rpm to improve engines breathing ability and broadens torque curve.

The C30A also made use of titanium connecting rods, which was another first in a mass-production vehicle. The lightweight rods allowed a higher RPM to be achieved while maintaining the strength of traditional steel rods. The C30A block is an open-deck design made from an aluminum alloy with cylinders sleeved in ductile iron. The heads are 4 valves per cylinder (24 valves per engine total), twin-cam design and contain the VTEC mechanism, which is actuated by oil pressure. For maximum performance, the C30A uses a direct ignition system, with individual ignition coils positioned directly over each cylinder spark plug.

With its DOHC layout and its lightweight rotating assembly, the C30A is capable of reliable high RPM operation, but due to its complexity, cost, and use of exotic materials, the C30A was used exclusively on Honda's NSX car. For NSXs equipped with a 4-speed automatic transmission, Honda used a slightly less powerful version of the C30A, with less aggressive cam timing and producing 252 bhp (188 kW; 255 PS).

Though never mass produced, a heavily upgraded version of the engine was briefly used in GT-spec NSXs for the 2004 JGTC racing series by the Team Honda Racing satellite team. This engine was extensively modified by Mugen and was the first turbocharged Honda engine used in the series: prior GT-spec NSXs used a variant of the naturally aspirated C32B engine. Though the exact performance figures were kept secret, it is rumored to output more than 500 bhp (373 kW).

Applications:

- 1991–1996 Honda NSX (5-Speed Manual Transmission)
- 1991–2005 Honda NSX (4-Speed Automatic Transmission)
- 1994–1996 Honda NSX Le Mans
- 2004 Honda NSX-GT Super GT

== C32A ==
The C32A is a 3,206 cc (3.2 L) version. The SOHC depending on model year, produces 200 hp (203 PS; 149 kW) or 230 hp (172 kW).

Applications;

- C32A - SOHC USDM - 200 hp (203 PS; 149 kW) and 284 N⋅m; 210 lbf⋅ft (29 kg⋅m)
  - 1991–1995 Acura Legend sedan
  - 1991–1992 Acura Legend coupé
  - 1994–1999 Daewoo Arcadia
- C32A1 - Also known as the "Type-II"; uses a higher flowing intake manifold and slightly more aggressive camshaft - SOHC USDM - 230 hp (233 PS; 172 kW) at 6200 rpm and 279 N⋅m; 206 lbf⋅ft (28.5 kg⋅m) at 5000 rpm.
  - 1994–1995 Acura Legend GS sedan
  - 1993–1995 Acura Legend LS and L coupe
- C32A5 - SOHC JDM - 200 hp (203 PS; 149 kW) and 284 N⋅m; 210 lbf⋅ft (29 kg⋅m)
  - 1995–1998 Honda Inspire/Honda Saber
- C32A6 - SOHC USDM - 200 hp (203 PS; 149 kW) and 284 N⋅m; 210 lbf⋅ft (29 kg⋅m)
  - 1996–1998 Acura 3.2TL

== C32B ==
The C32B is a highly tuned DOHC V6 used in the Honda NSX, which produces 290 bhp (294 PS; 216 kW) at 7,100 rpm and 304 N⋅m; 224 lbf⋅ft (31 kg⋅m) at 5,500 rpm of torque, retaining the 10.2:1 compression ratio from the C30A. The engine is essentially an update to the C30A and does not share commonality with the C32A. Honda increased displacement to 3,179 cc (3.2 L; 194.0 cu in) through the use of larger 93 mm (3.66 in) pistons over the 90 mm (3.54 in) used in the C30A, while leaving the 78 mm (3.07 in) stroke the same. To accommodate the larger pistons, Honda used an advanced metallurgical technique on the cylinders called Fiber Reinforced Metal (FRM), in which an ultra lightweight alumina-carbon fiber is cast into the traditional aluminum alloy for enhanced rigidity. This process allowed thinner cylinder walls to be used while providing acceptable cooling characteristics. The C32B also used 36 mm (1.4 in) intake valves, which are 1 mm (0.04 in) larger than those in the C30A.

Applications:

- 1997–2005 Honda NSX (6-Speed manual transmission)
- 1996–2002, 2005–2009 Honda NSX-GT Super GT
- 2002 Vemac RD320R Super GT

== C35A ==
The C35A is a SOHC and carries the largest displacement of the C series at 3,473 cc (3.5 L; 211.9 cu in). The C35A was the first mass-produced engine to use block forged connecting rods contributing to precise balancing and an exceptionally strong bottom end. The C35 also contains a balance shaft to dampen engine vibrations associated with 90 degree design V6 engines. Besides the addition of these forged components, the overall design is similar to its smaller counterpart the C32A, with some parts being interchangeable. The 9.6:1 compression ratio of the C32A is also retained, despite the increase in displacement.

Applications:

- C35A - SOHC JDM - 212 bhp (215 PS; 158 kW)
  - 1996–2004 Honda Legend
- C35A1 - SOHC USDM - 210–225 bhp (213–228 PS; 157–168 kW)
  - 1996–2001 Acura 3.5RL; 210 bhp (213 PS; 157 kW) at 5200 rpm and 304 N⋅m; 224 lbf⋅ft (31 kg⋅m) of torque at 2800 rpm
  - 2002–2004 Acura 3.5RL; 225 bhp (228 PS; 168 kW) at 5200 rpm and 314 N⋅m; 231 lbf⋅ft (32 kg⋅m) of torque at 2800 rpm
- C35A2 - SOHC EDM - 202 bhp (205 PS; 151 kW)
  - 1996–1998 Honda Legend
- C35A5 - SOHC EDM - 205 bhp (208 PS; 153 kW)
  - 1998–2004 Honda Legend

== C35B ==
The C35B (name unconfirmed) is a DOHC V6 with VTEC which shares basic design properties with its SOHC non-VTEC counterpart but with more aggressive camshafts and slightly lighter cylinder walls. This was the only DOHC VTEC V6 ever built by Honda for longitudinal applications and was only used in one non-production car, the Honda FS-X concept.

Applications:

- 1991 Honda FS-X concept - 280 hp (284 PS; 209 kW)

== See also ==
- List of Honda engines
