= Honda H4 transmission =

H4

Overview
- Manufacturer: Honda
- Production: 1983–1997

Body and chassis
- Class: 4-speed transverse automatic transmission

Chronology
- Predecessor: H3
- Successor: M6HA; B7XA

The H4 was Honda's first 4-speed automatic transmission.

Applications:

- 1983 Honda Accord (AK)
- 1983–1985 Honda Prelude (AS)
- 1984–1985 Honda Accord (AS)
- 1985–1987 Honda Prelude (F4)
- 1986–1989 Honda Accord (F4)
- 1986–1987 Honda Civic (CA)
- 1986–1987 Honda CRX (CA)
- 1986–1987 Acura Integra (CA)
- 1988–1989 Honda Prelude (K4)
- 1988–1989 Acura Integra (P1)
- 1988–1991 Honda Civic (L4)
- 1988–1991 Honda CRX (L4)
- 1989–1991 Honda Civic AWD (S5)
- 1990–1991 Honda Prelude (PY8A)

== H4A ==
The H4A was a modified version the H4, with three shafts rather than the two. Introduced in 1990 on the flagship Honda Accord, it was replaced by the light-duty M6HA series and medium-duty B7XA.

Applications:

- 1990– Honda Accord (PX4B)
- 1991–1992 Honda Accord (APX4)
- 1991– Honda Accord (MPXA)
- 1992– Honda Accord (MPWA)
- 1992–1994 Acura Vigor (MPWA)
- 1993– Honda Accord (MPXA)
- 1994–1997 Honda Accord (MPOA)

== See also ==
- List of Honda transmissions
