= Acura CDX =

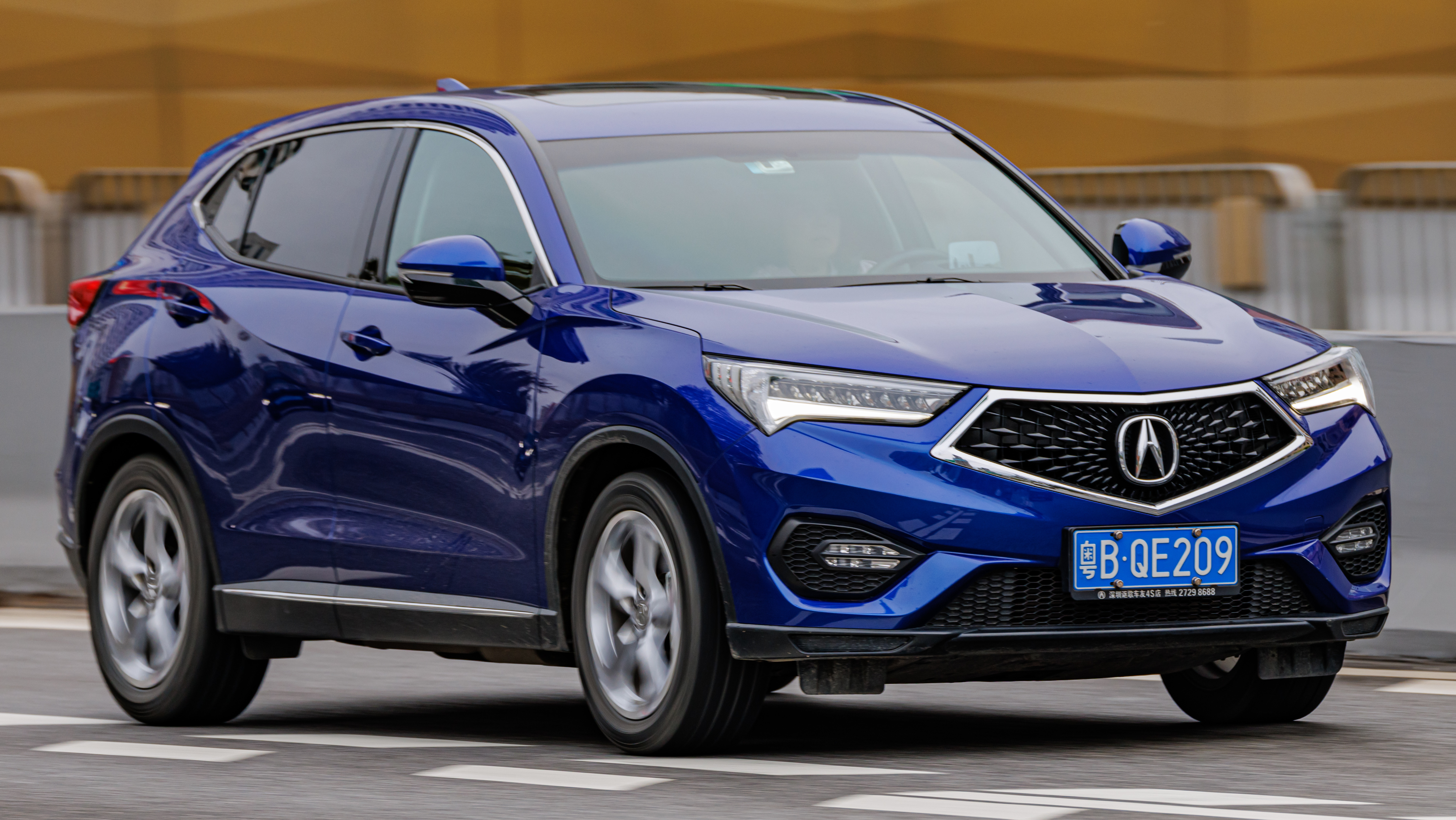

Overview
- Manufacturer: Honda
- Model code: RH4; RH5
- Production: 2016–2022
- Assembly: China: Guangzhou (Guangqi Honda)
- Designer: Hirotoshi Tamura

Body and chassis
- Class: Subcompact luxury crossover SUV
- Body style: 5-door SUV
- Layout: Front-engine, front-wheel-drive; Front-engine, four-wheel-drive
- Related: Honda Vezel/XR-V (first generation)

Powertrain
- Engine: Petrol: 1.5 L L15B9 VTEC DOHC turbo I4; Petrol hybrid: 2.0 L LFA1 i-VTEC DOHC I4
- Power output: 134 kW (180 hp; 182 PS) (L15B9)
- Transmission: 8-speed dual-clutch

Dimensions
- Wheelbase: 2,660 mm (104.7 in)
- Length: 4,439 mm (174.8 in)
- Width: 1,859 mm (73.2 in)
- Height: 1,597 mm (62.9 in)

The Acura CDX is a subcompact luxury crossover SUV produced by Acura, a luxury vehicle division of Honda, for the Chinese market. The CDX was manufactured by Guangqi Honda. The car made its debut at the Beijing Auto Show in April 2016. The CDX was produced at the Zengcheng Plant in Guangzhou, China and was available from July 2016 until April 2022, when Acura announced that the brand would be exiting the Chinese market.

Upon release, the CDX was planned as a Chinese-only domestic model, with Acura announcing it had no plans to launch it in North America. However, according to Jon Ikeda, group vice president of Acura USA, Acura had considered selling the CDX in the United States although that ultimately never happened.

In 2020, an A-Spec variant of the CDX was released, featuring more aggressive styling, blacked-out plastic trim, two-tone mirrors, and unique 18-inch wheels.

== Powertrain ==
Power comes from a 134 kW (182 PS; 180 hp) 1.5-liter DOHC VTEC Turbo "Earth Dreams" engine coupled to an 8-speed dual-clutch transmission. It is available in front-wheel drive (FWD) and all-wheel drive (AWD) configurations.

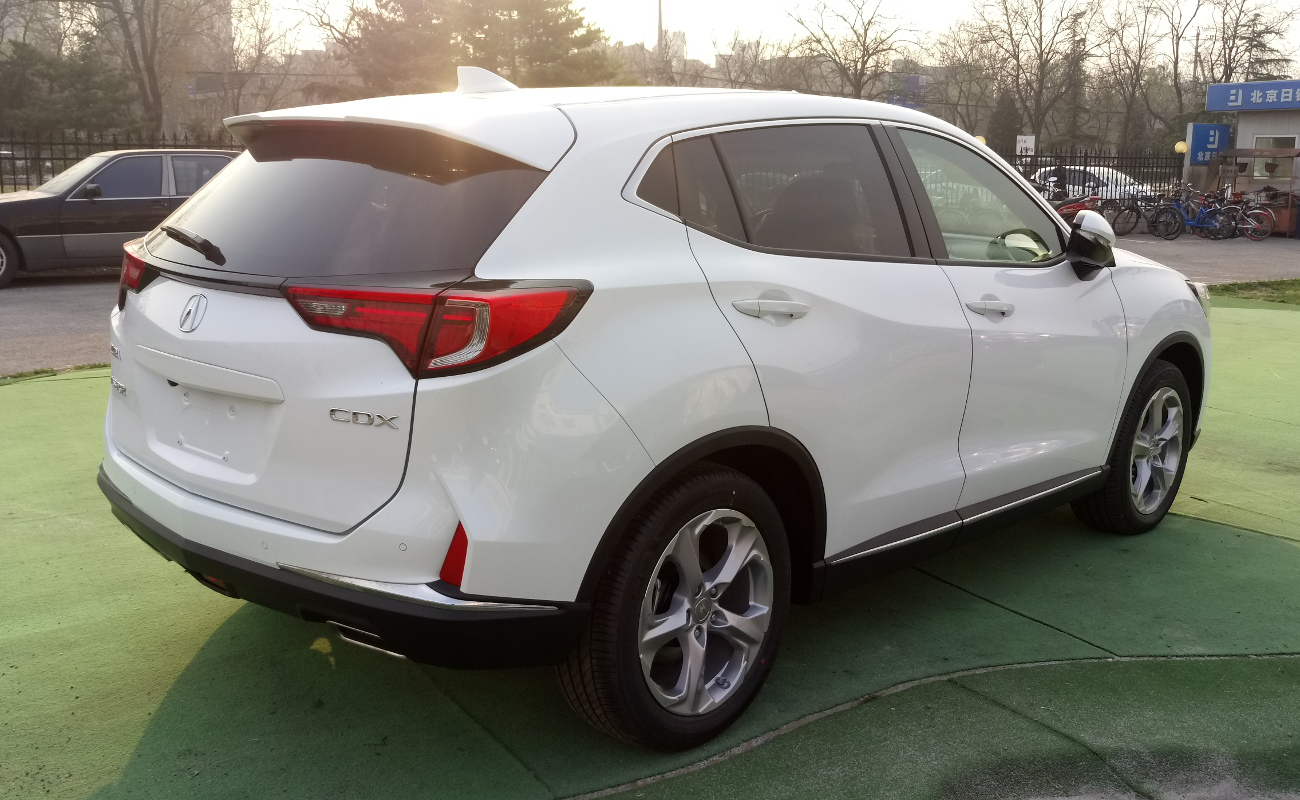
Rear view

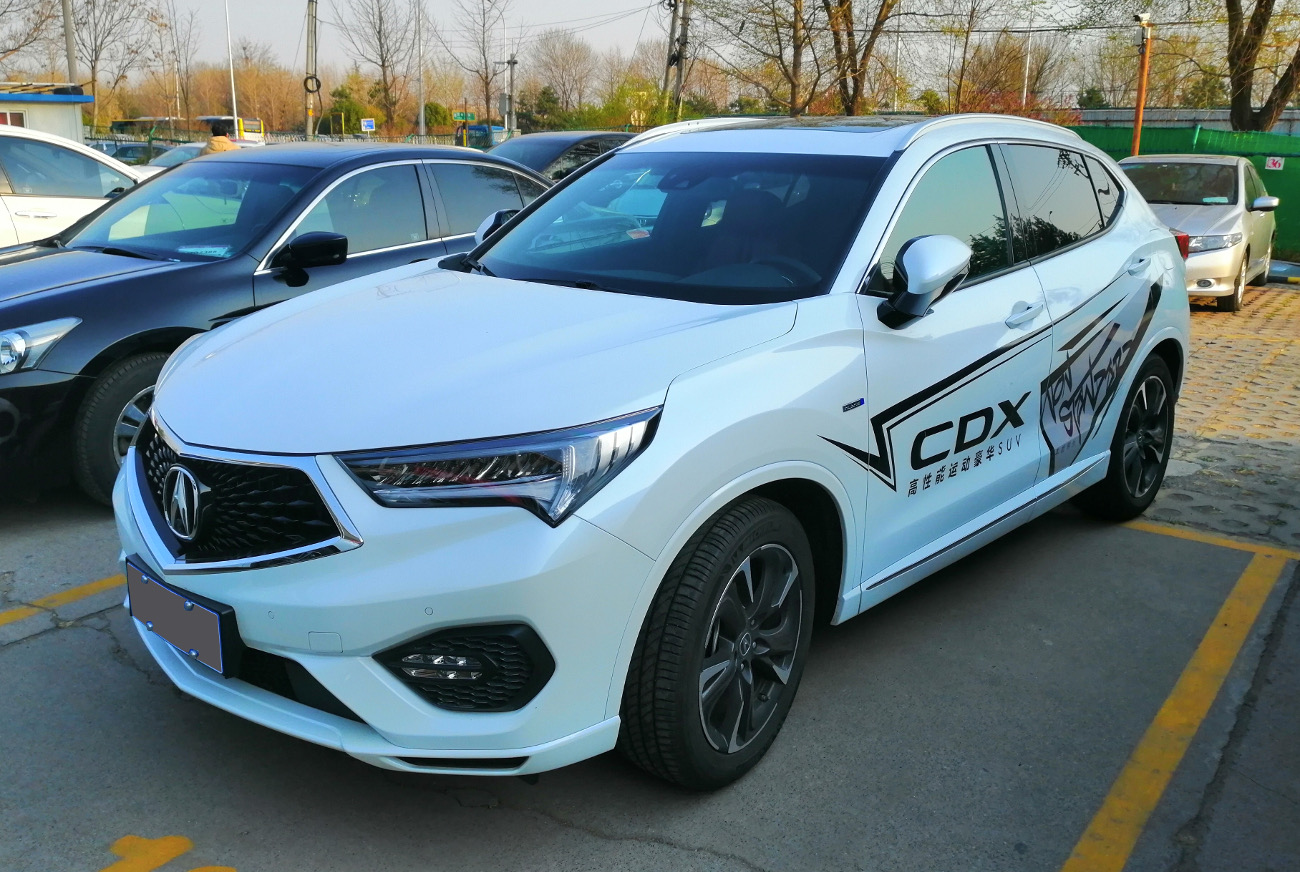
Acura CDX Hybrid

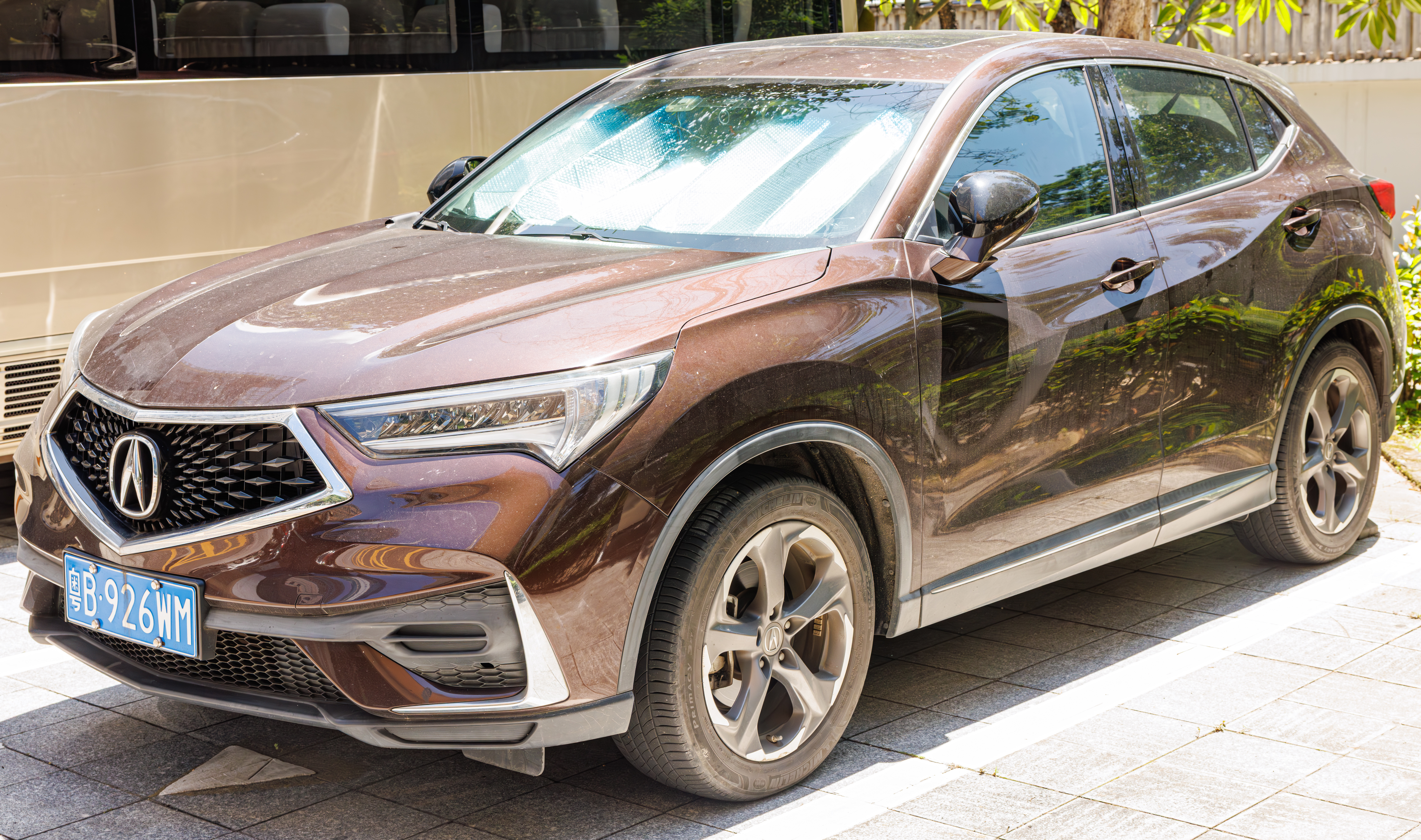
Facelift

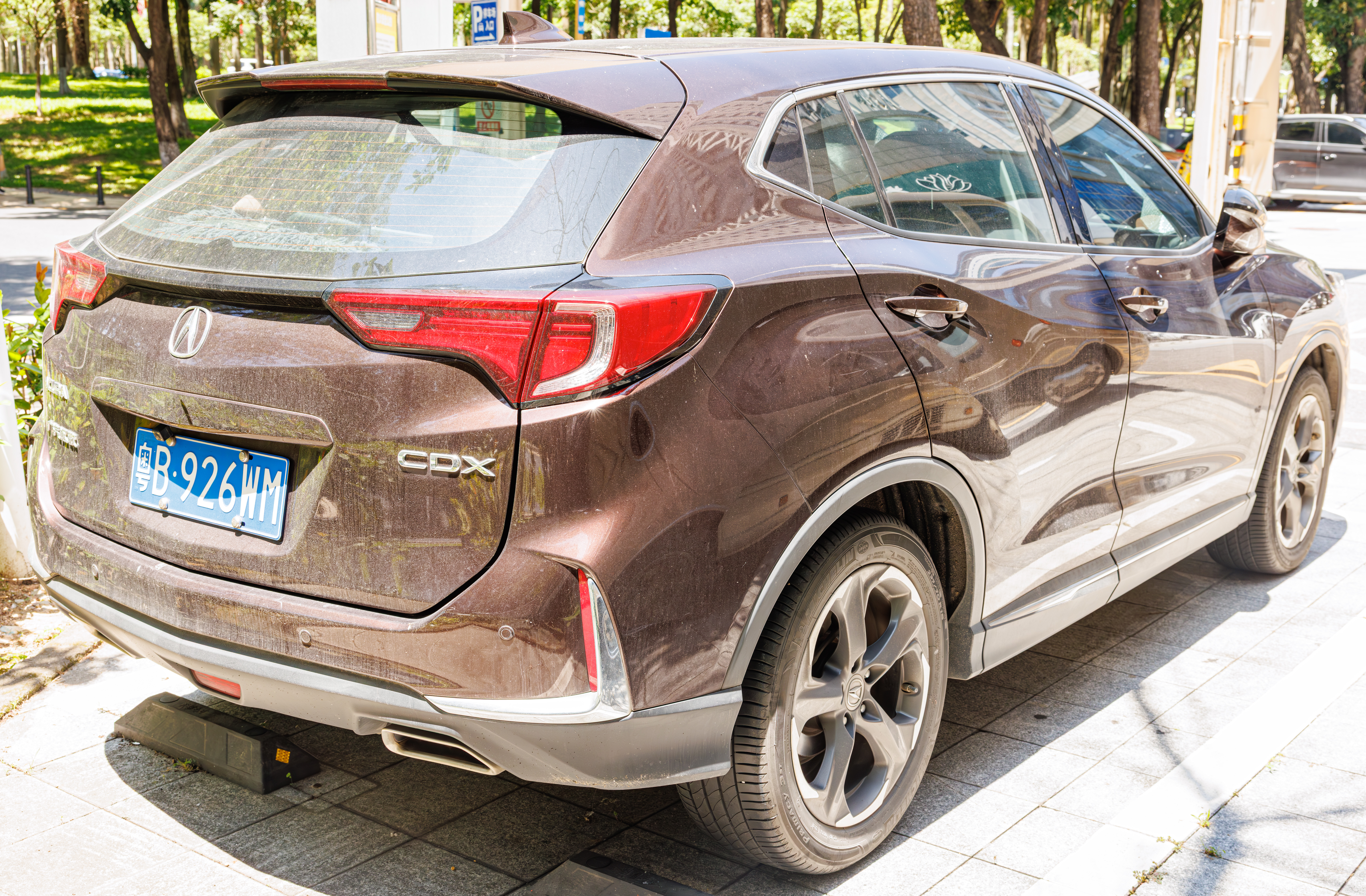
Facelift (Rear view)

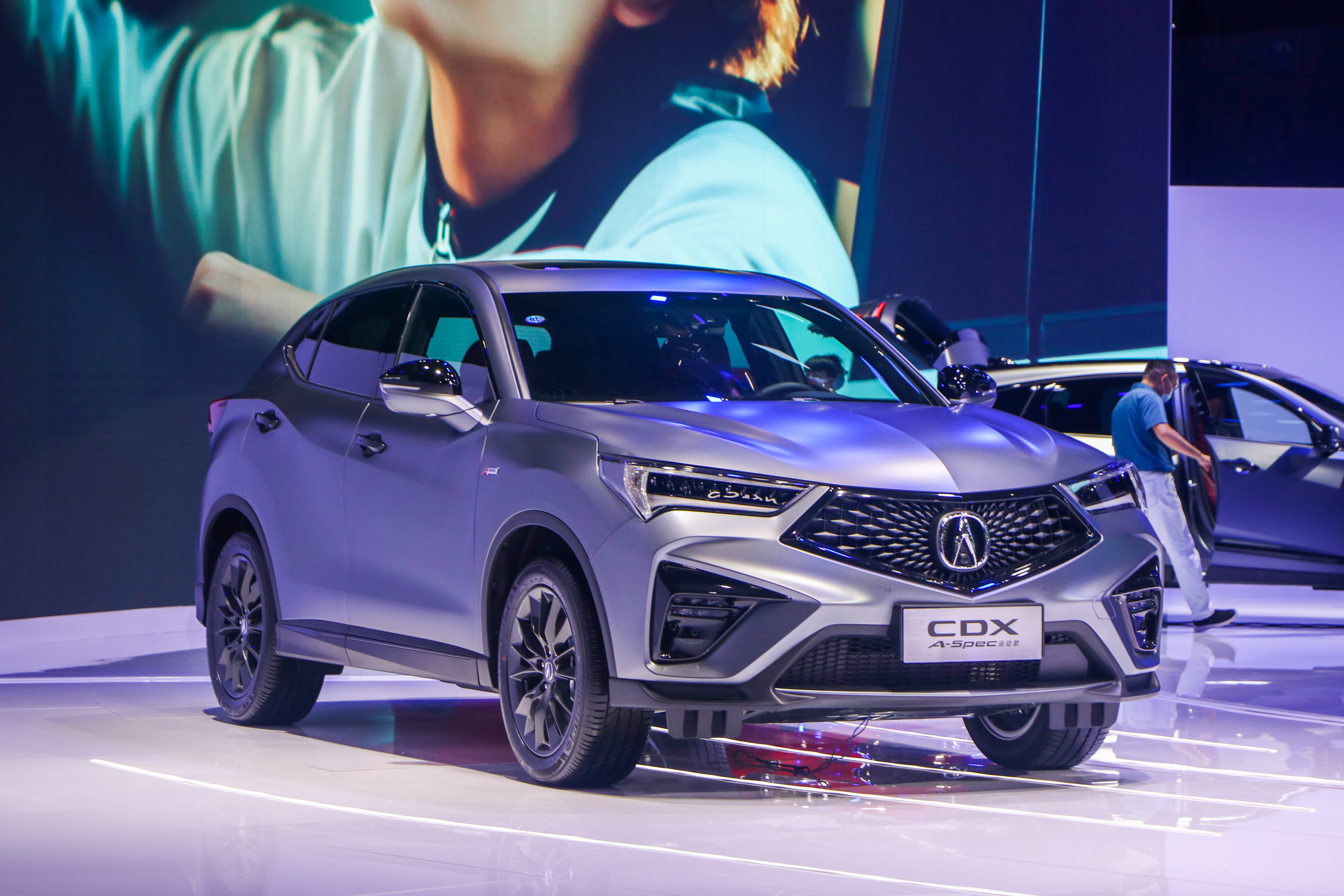
CDX A-Spec

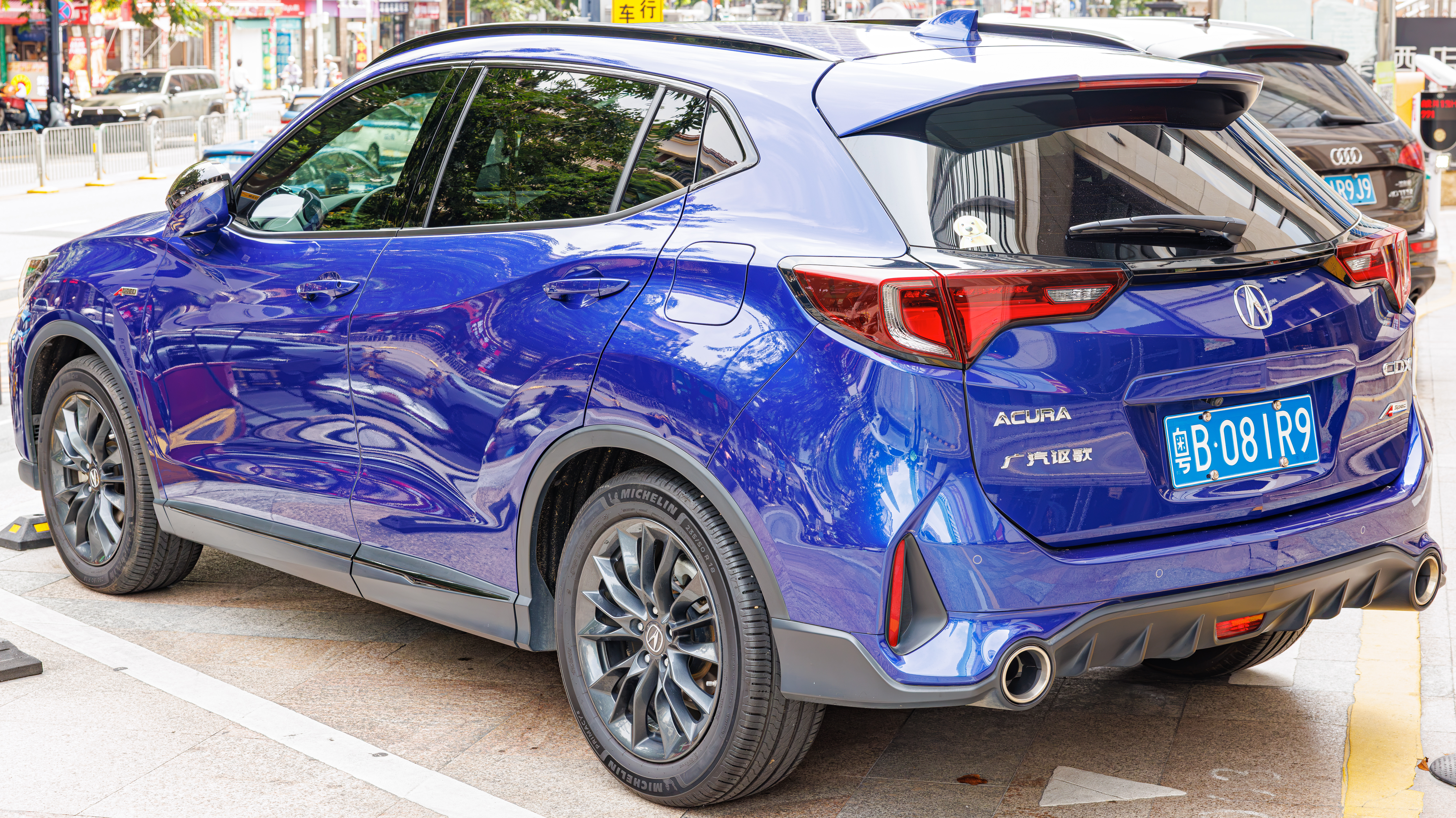
CDX A-Spec (Rear view)

== Chassis ==
The CDX is based on the Honda HR-V and uses a MacPherson strut independent front suspension with a torsion beam rigid axle rear suspension and is equipped with electronically adjustable adaptive damping that is similar to the Civic Type R.

== Performance ==
The FWD Acura CDX can accelerate to 100 km/h (62 mph) in 8.6 seconds, and in 9.7 seconds for the AWD models. The top speed is electronically limited to 210 km/h (130 mph).

== Sales figures ==
Acura CDX Sales
Year	China sales
2016	6,842
2017	14,111
2018	5,188
2019	6,773
2020	5,388
2021	2,810
2022	712
