= Acura CL =

Luxury mid-size coupe by Acura (1997–2003)

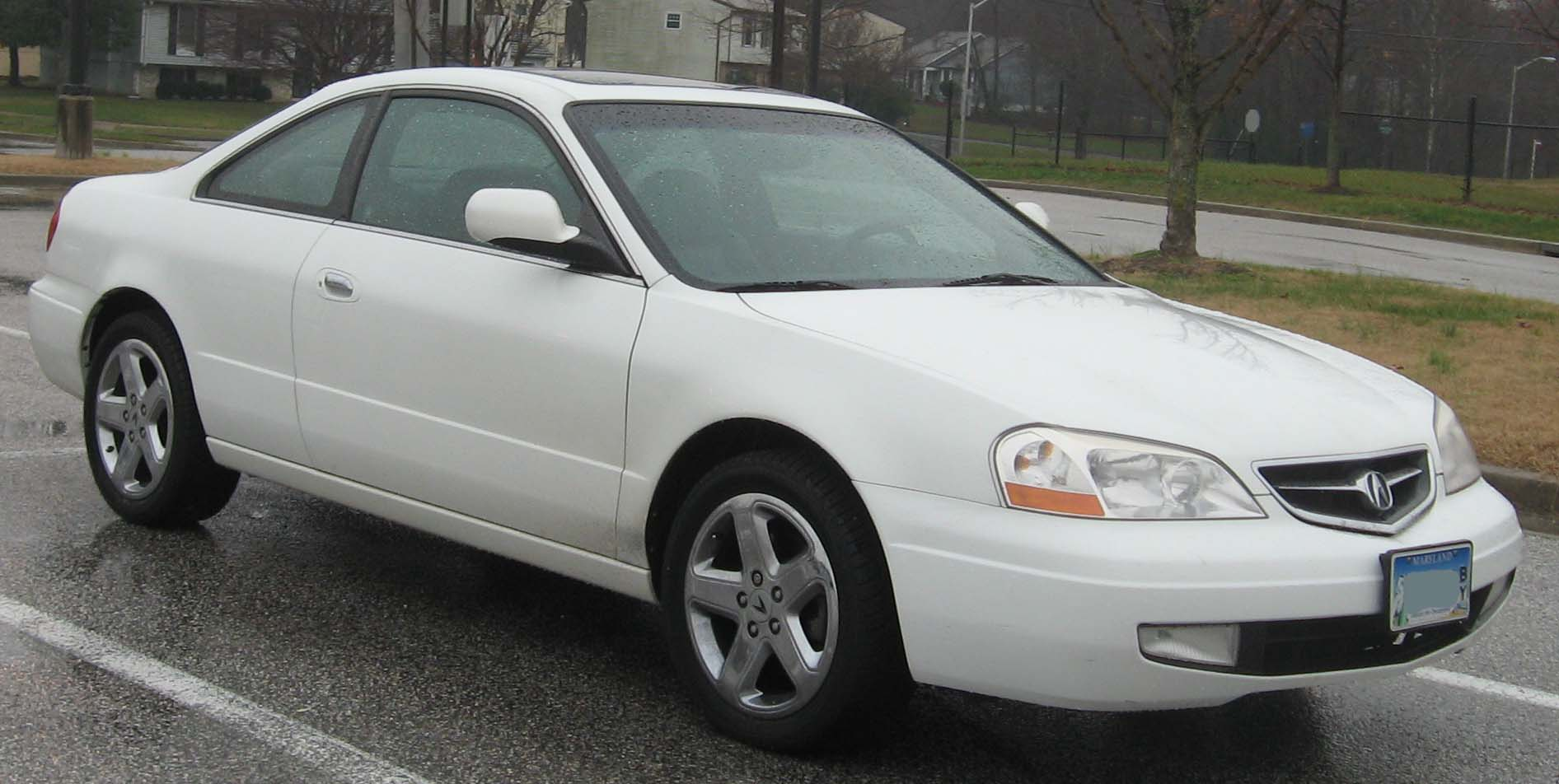
- 2nd-gen Acura CL

Overview
- Manufacturer: Honda
- Production: 1996–2003
- Assembly: United States: Marysville, Ohio

Body and chassis
- Class: Personal luxury car
- Body style: 2-door coupé
- Layout: Front-engine, front-wheel-drive

Chronology
- Predecessor: Acura Legend (coupe)
- Successor: Acura TL

The Acura CL is a midsize four passenger coupe manufactured and marketed by Honda's Acura brand across two generations from 1997–2003 model years.

All first generation Acura CLs were manufactured at Honda's plant in East Liberty, Ohio with the Honda Civic. The second generation CL, TL and the Honda Accord upon which the Acura CLs were based, are manufactured at Honda's plant in Marysville, Ohio. The CL was the first Acura to be built in the United States.

With the release of the TL and 3.5RL in 1996, Acura transitioned to alphanumeric and/or two-letter names.

== Acura CL-X ==
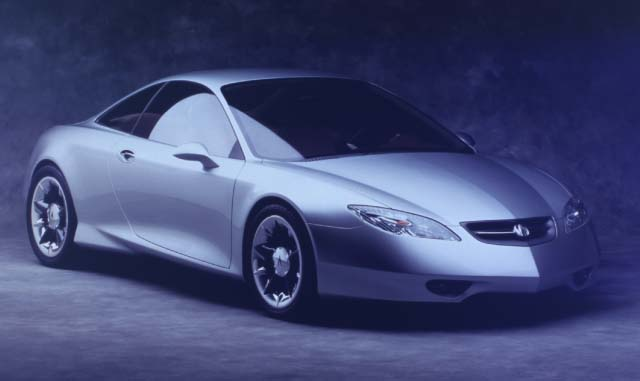
Acura CL-X concept car

The Acura CL-X is a concept car built by Acura (in conjunction with its parent company Honda) for the 1995 North American International Auto Show in Detroit. It was designed in Honda's R&D North America studio in Los Angeles. It is a two-dour coupe with a wheelbase of 106.9 in (272 cm) and a track width of 63.2 in (161 cm). The concept was shown to preview the styling and body style of what would become the CL. The particular car shown had special carbon fiber and aluminum composite wheels designed for performance, with a staggered wheel setup of 18 inches in the front and 19 inches in the rear. It was reported to have a top speed of 140 mph (225 km/h).

== First generation (1996) ==
First generation
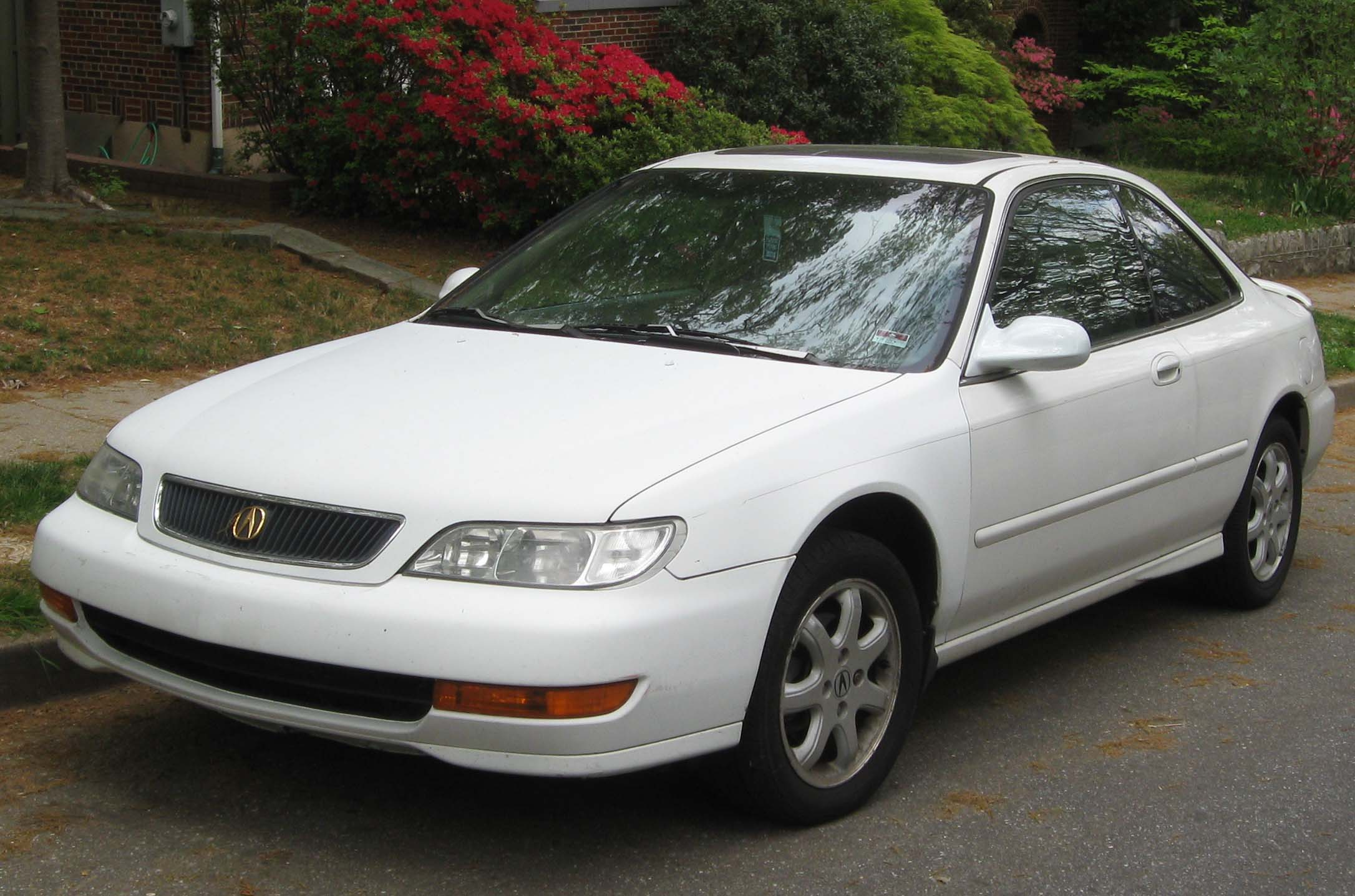
- 1998–1999 Acura CL

Overview
- Model code: YA1
- Production: February 1996–1999
- Model years: 1997–1999

Body and chassis
- Related: Acura TL; Honda Accord; Honda Odyssey; Isuzu Aska; Isuzu Oasis

Powertrain
- Engine: 2.2 L F22B1 I4; 2.3 L F23A1 I4; 3.0 L J30A1 V6
- Transmission: 4-speed automatic 5-speed manual

Dimensions
- Wheelbase: 106.9 in (2,715 mm)
- Length: 190.0 in (4,826 mm)
- Width: 70.1 in (1,781 mm)
- Height: 54.7 in (1,389 mm)
- Curb weight: 3,064 lb (1,390 kg) (I-4); 3,285 lb (1,490 kg) (V6)

The Acura CL entered production in February 1996 for the 1997 model year, offered as the 3.0CL with either a 3.0 L J30A1 V6 producing 200 hp (149 kW), or a 2.2CL with a 2.2 L F22B1 I4 generating 145 hp (108 kW). For the 1998 and 1999 models years, the 2.2 was replaced by the 2.3CL offering a 2.3 L 4-cylinder F23A1 engine with 150 hp (112 kW).

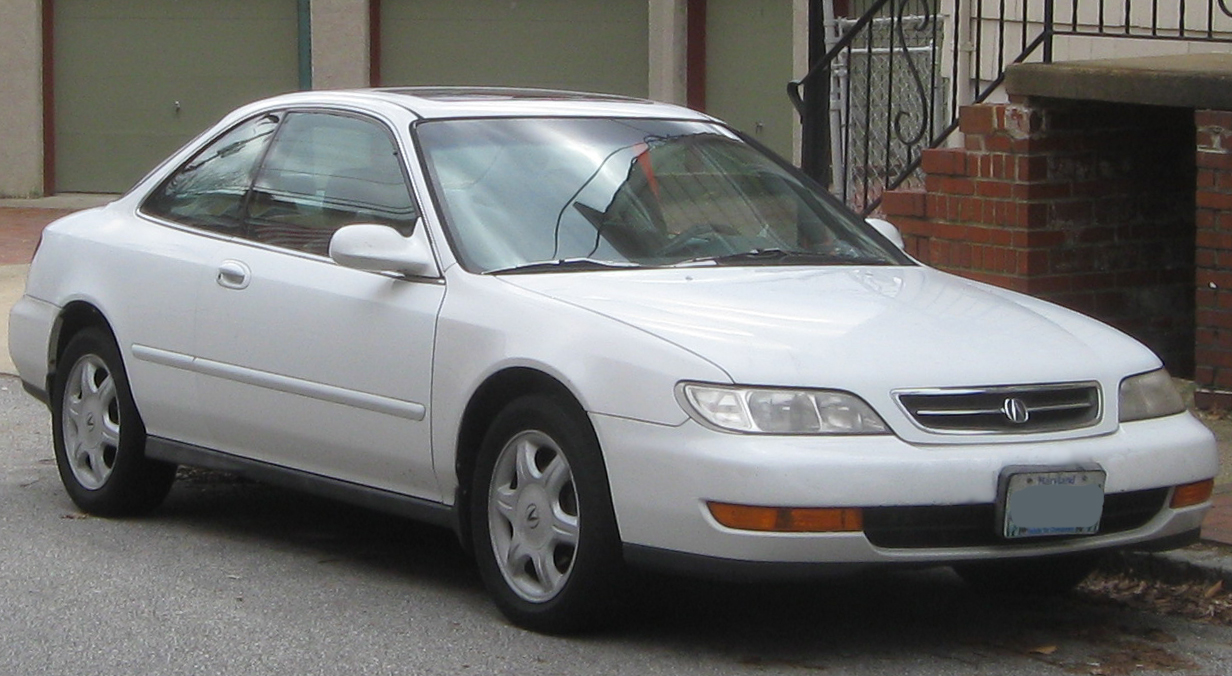
1997 Acura CL

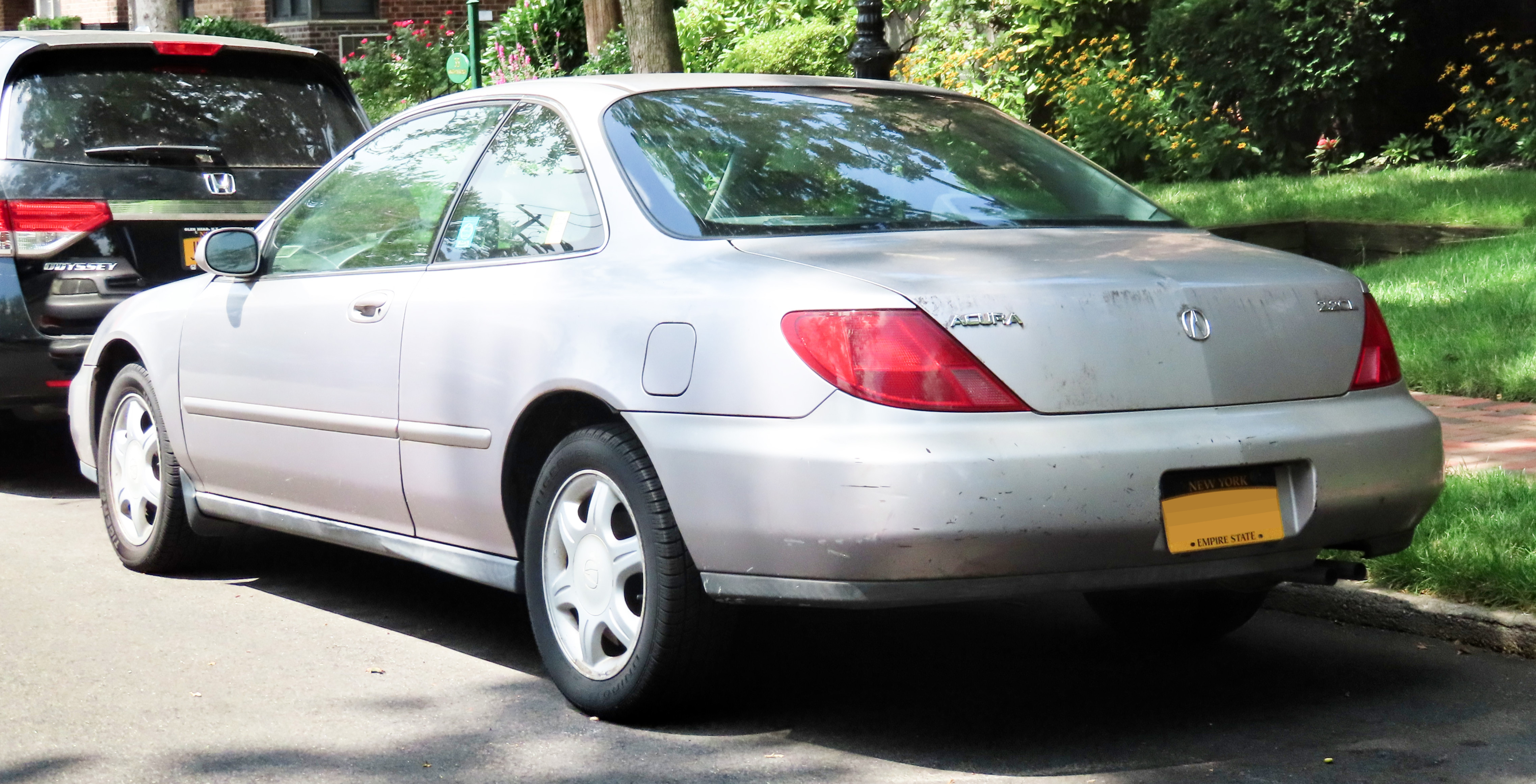
Rear view

Both the 4-cylinder and 6-cylinder CL offered a "Premium" trim level which offered leather upholstery (with heated front seats in the 3.0), and in the 3.0, an Acura/Bose stereo. For the 1999 model year, the "Premium" trim level was eliminated, and leather seating became standard on all models. The alloy wheel design was different on the 3.0 for each year, moving from a five-spoke design for 1997, to a seven-spoke design in 1998, and finally to a different multi-spoke alloy design for 1999. The 2.2CL used a six-spoke design, then moved to a 5-spoke double-prong design for 2.3CL. The 4-cylinder model had an option for a 5-speed manual transmission. The CL also featured galvanized body panels which helps to prevent rust.

- 1997–1999 Acura CL 3.0 L V6 – 200 hp (149 kW)
- 1997 Acura CL 2.2 L I4 – 145 hp (108 kW)
- 1998–1999 Acura CL 2.3 L I4 – 150 hp (112 kW)

== Second generation (2001) ==
Second generation
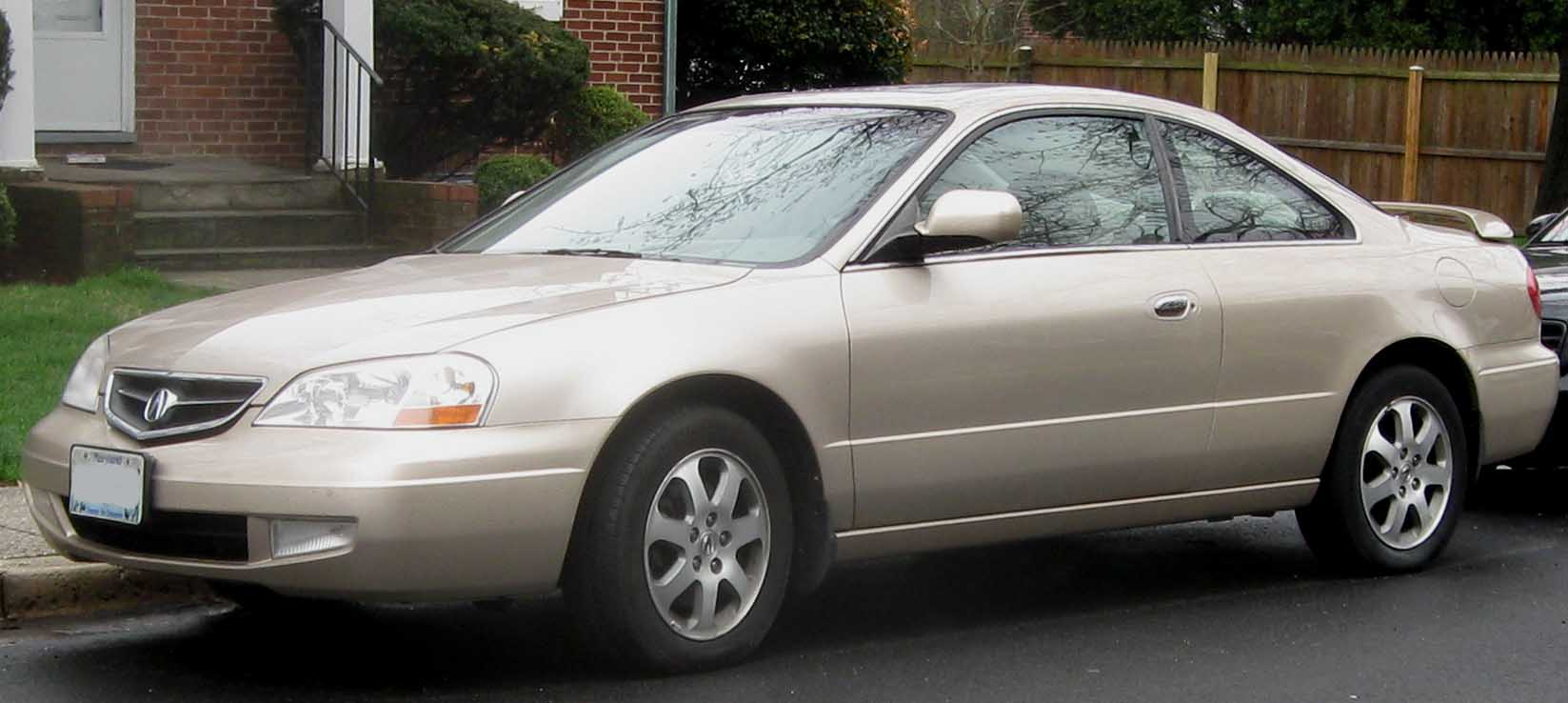
- 2000–2003 Acura CL

Overview
- Model code: YA4
- Production: January 2000–2003
- Model years: 2001–2003
- Designer: Donald Herner, Harumi Okano, Kunihiko Tachibana (1997)

Body and chassis
- Related: Acura TL; Honda Accord; Honda Pilot; Honda Odyssey

Powertrain
- Engine: 3.2 L J32A1 V6; 3.2 L J32A2 V6 (Type-S)
- Transmission: 5-speed automatic 6-speed manual (2003 only)

Dimensions
- Wheelbase: 106.9 in (2,715 mm)
- Length: 192.0 in (4,877 mm)
- Width: 70.6 in (1,793 mm)
- Height: 55.5 in (1,410 mm)
- Curb weight: 3,450 lb (1,565 kg)

For the 1999 model year, the Acura CL's sibling, the TL, was redesigned. The CL, however, was never produced as a 2000 model and instead in March 2000 the completely redesigned Acura CL was released as a 2001 model featuring a 3.2 L SOHC VTEC J-series V6. A navigation system was also available along with the Type-S model, denoting Acura's 'Sport' edition. While the regular CL featured a 225 hp (168 kW) V6, the Type-S boasted a 260 hp (194 kW) V6 with 17-inch wheels, a firmer suspension, slightly larger brakes, and firmer seats. At the time, the Type-S was the most powerful front-wheel drive vehicle Honda had ever manufactured.

In 2002, the CL Type-S was offered, as a 2003 model, with a close-ratio 6-speed manual transmission with a helical limited-slip differential. The 6-speed CL deleted some minor interior features from the automatic, such as a center console light. Also, the heated seats only featured one heat setting (vs. high and low in the auto). VSA and TCS were also not found on the 6-speed car, and as such, a 3-channel ABS unit was used. One of the main criticisms of the CL was that a manual transmission had been dropped when the car was redesigned for the 2001 model year. Very few manual transmission models were built; there were 2,690 without navigation and 824 with navigation, for a total of 3,514 in the US market. An additional 331 cars were produced for the Canadian market, all without navigation. Despite such small numbers of manual transmissions, there was still a greater demand than Acura had expected. The 6-speed car was highly praised by critics, with one calling it "the high point of Acura performance outside the NSX and Integra Type-R". However, with the CL's sister car, the TL, coming up on a redesign for the 2004 model year, the CL was dropped from Acura's lineup with no mid-size luxury coupe replacement. Total Acura CL sales from 2000 until 2003, when the last new model was sold, was less than 31,000 units. The CL's manual transmission survives in the third-generation TL and 7th generation Honda Accord.

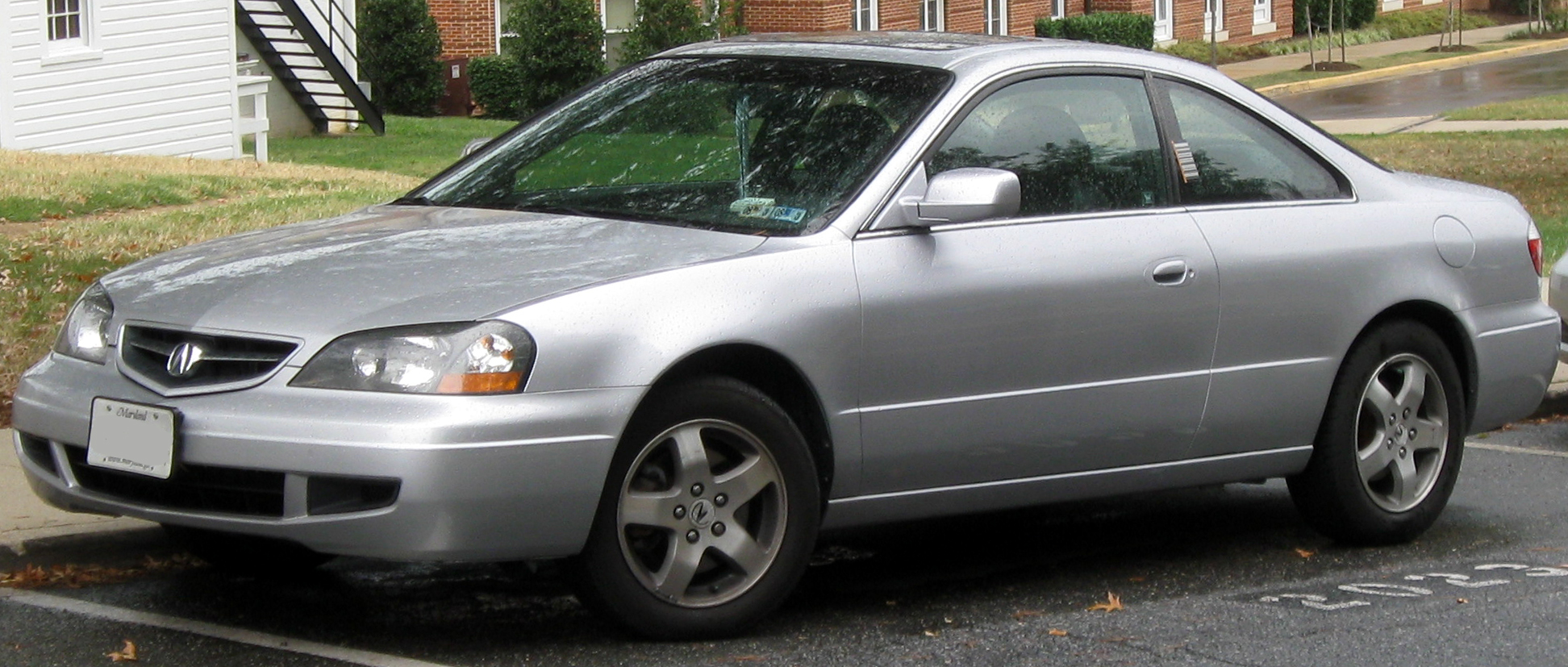
2003 Acura CL

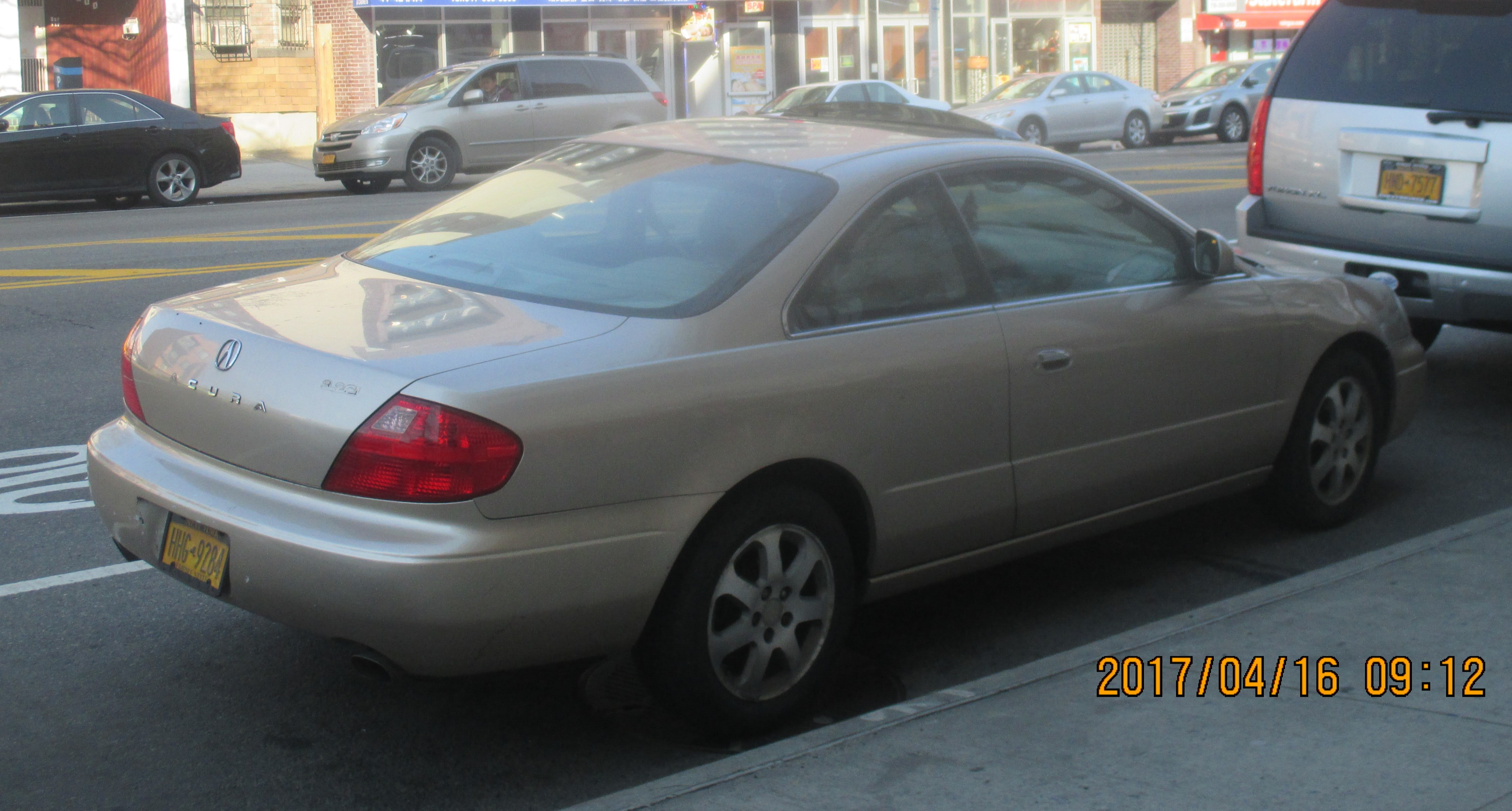
Rear view

The 2003 model year also brought cosmetic changes to the CL. The 5-watt road/fog lamps found on the 2001–02 models were deleted, and non-functional air vents were installed in their place. The grille surround and door handles became body colored, as opposed to being chrome on the 2001–02 models. The side mirrors were also redesigned (for both the 2002 and 2003 models) by having a more square shape, full-body matched paint, and tinted glass since customers had complained about excessive wind noise coming from the mirror seam. The 2003 models also saw new headlights which featured a blacked-out interior, and the taillight lenses had a cleared turn signal and reverse light. Type-S models included updated 17 × 7" 12-spoke wheels. Revised thicker exhaust tips were also a new addition. Canadian CLs offer daytime running lights and a windshield washer fluid level sensor as standard equipment (USDM CLs do not have these as an option).

- 2001–2003 Acura 3.2 CL – 225 hp (168 kW), 217 lb⋅ft (294 N⋅m) mpg: 17 city/27 hwy. (5AT)
- 2001–2003 Acura 3.2 CL Type S – 260 hp (194 kW) at 6,100 rpm, 232 lb⋅ft (315 N⋅m) at 3,500–5,500 rpm. mpg: 19 city/29 hwy (6MT), 17 city/27 hwy. (5AT)

=== High-performance models ===
In 2002, Honda Access America developed a performance package for the CL Type S, which was built in concert with tuning firm Comptech. A specially designed Eaton twin-screw Roots-type supercharger was coupled with numerous suspension, exhaust, braking, and drivetrain enhancements. 0 to 60 mph times of the coupe were reduced from 6.0 seconds on a stock Type S to 5.7 seconds with the modifications. Output was claimed to be 369 hp (275 kW) at 6,800 rpm and 302 lb⋅ft (409 N⋅m) of torque at 5,400 rpm (both measured at the crank), with a fuel economy rating of 19 mpg_{‑US} (12 l/100 km).

=== Automatic transmission concerns ===
Problems have been seen with the second-generation CL models equipped with automatic transmissions (manual transmission models are unaffected). Reports say that after an average of around 40,000 miles, the transmission experiences gear failures, such as downshifts, slipping, flaring and not shifting, and leaking.

One main cause is excessive wear of the 3rd gear clutch pack, resulting in large amounts of debris blocking the flow of transmission fluid. Many owners reported problems with the replacement transmissions as well. Similar transmission-related issues exist in the Honda Accord, Acura MDX, Acura TL as well as the Honda Odyssey.

Due to many failures, the manufacturer extended the warranty on the automatic transmission on nearly all second-generation CLs to 84 months or 100,000 miles (160,000 km). However, many rebuilt transmissions used as replacements also experienced problems, leading to a class-action lawsuit which extended the warranty to 93 months or 109,000 miles (180,000 km) for covered owners in the United States.

In addition, there was an unrelated transmission recall for safety reasons after it was found a gear could to overheat, break and cause the transmission to lock up, bringing the vehicle to a sudden stop.

== Sales ==
Calendar year	Total US sales
1996	16,740
1997	28,939
1998	26,644
1999	20,968
2000	24,677
2001	18,993
2002	12,072
2003	6,593
2004	283
