= Acura Legend =

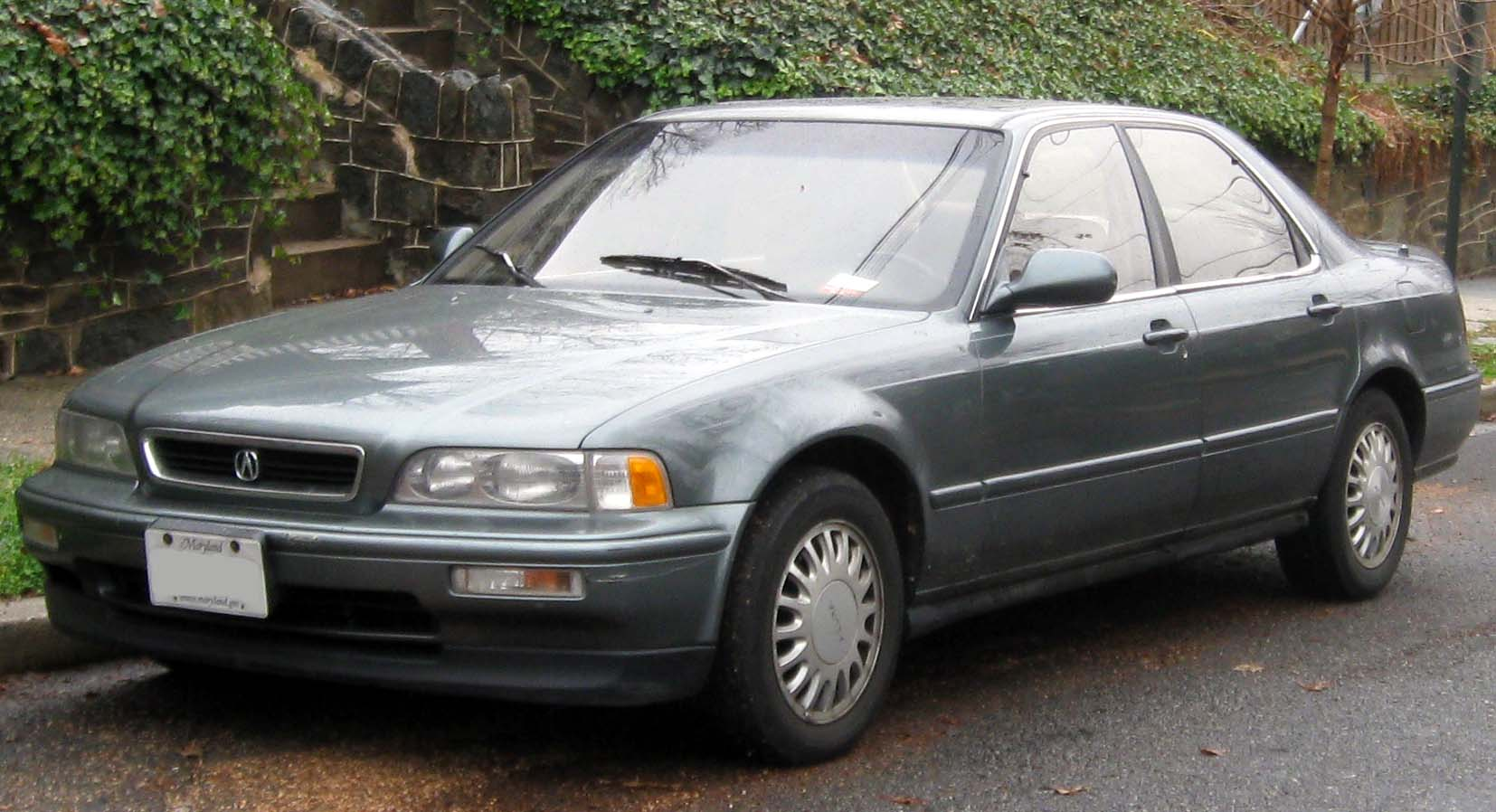
- Second generation Acura Legend sedan (US)

Overview
- Manufacturer: Honda
- Also called: Honda Legend
- Production: 1985–1995
- Assembly: Japan: Sayama, Saitama (Sayama Plant)

Body and chassis
- Class: mid-size luxury car
- Body style: 2-door coupe 4-door sedan

Chronology
- Successor: Acura RL; Acura CL (Coupe)

The Acura Legend is a mid-size luxury car sold in the United States and Canada by Acura, the luxury division of Honda, from 1985 until 1995. It was the first flagship sedan sold under the Acura nameplate, until being renamed in 1996 as the Acura 3.5RL. The 3.5RL was the North American version of the KA9 series Honda Legend.

The opportunity for Japanese manufacturers to export more expensive models had arisen with the 1980s voluntary export restraints, negotiated by the Japanese government and U.S. trade representatives, restricting mainstream car sales. The initial success of the Legend and Honda's Acura division in competing against established European and American luxury manufacturers would lead to Toyota and Nissan creating the Lexus and Infiniti brands, respectively, to compete in the luxury car market.

== First generation (1986) ==
First generation
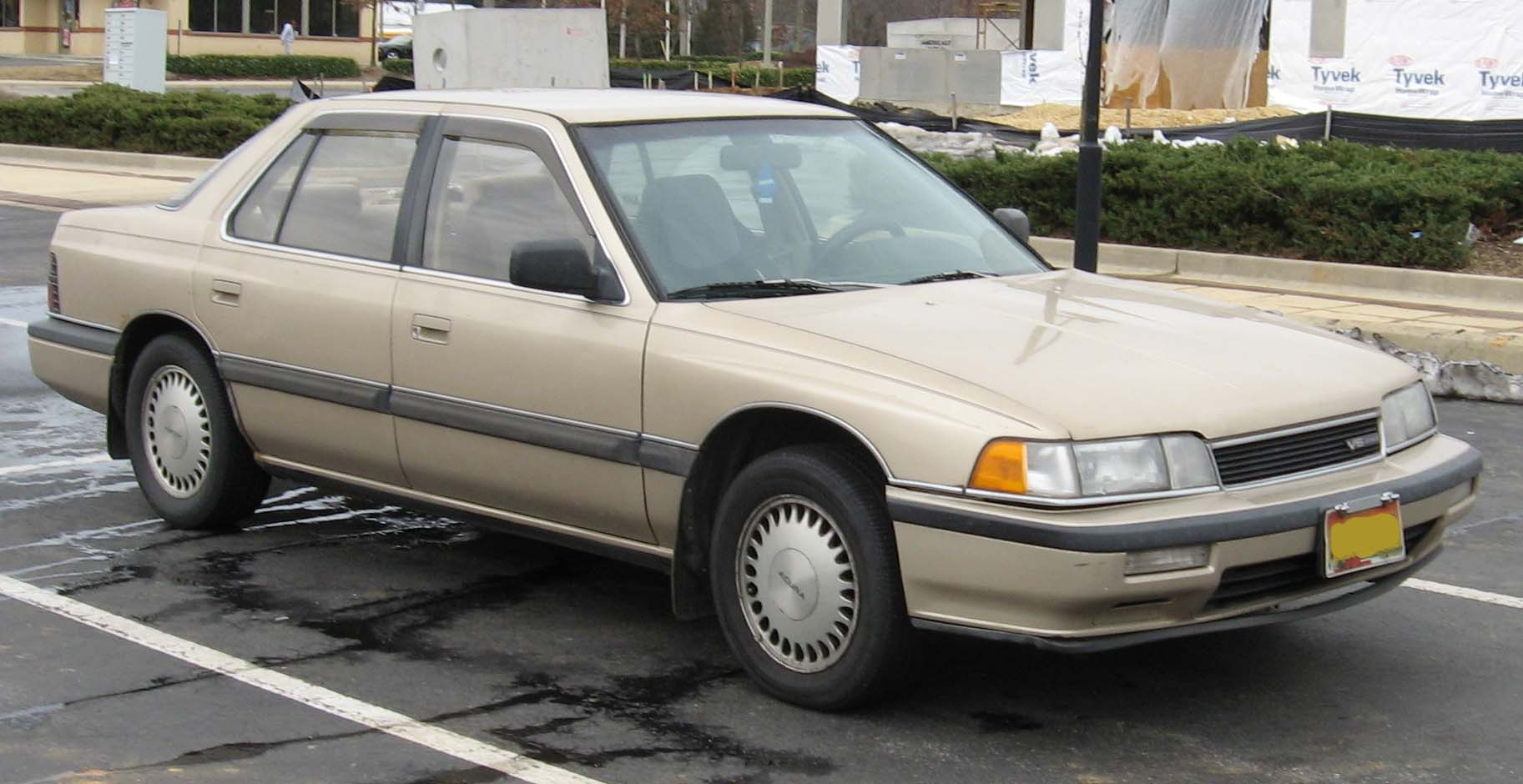
- 1988 Acura Legend LS sedan (US)

Overview
- Model code: KA3/KA4
- Production: 1985–1990
- Designer: Tetsuya Mizuno, Yukio Kurosu, Yoshio Ui (1982, 1984)

Body and chassis
- Layout: Transverse front-engine, front-wheel drive
- Related: Rover 800-series Sterling 825/827

Powertrain
- Engine: 2.0 L C20A V6; 2.0 L Turbo C20AT V6; 2.5 L C25A V6; 2.7 L C27A V6
- Transmission: 4-Speed Automatic; 5-Speed Manual

Dimensions
- Wheelbase: Sedan: 108.7 in (2,761 mm); Coupe: 106.5 in (2,705 mm)
- Length: 1985–1988 Sedan: 189.4 in (4,811 mm); Coupe: 188 in (4,775.2 mm); 1989–1990 Sedan: 190.6 in (4,841 mm)
- Width: 1989–1990 Sedan: 68.9 in (1,750 mm); 1986–1988 Sedan: 68.3 in (1,735 mm); Coupe: 68.7 in (1,745 mm)
- Height: Sedan: 54.7 in (1,389 mm); Coupe: 53.9 in (1,369 mm)

Honda introduced the model in Japan on October 22, 1985, to be their premier luxury model, and in North America for the 1986 model year, as the top of the line model for its then-new Acura lineup. Sedan models came to the market first, powered by a 151 hp (113 kW) 2.5 L C25A V6, with coupes making their first appearance in 1987, powered by a new 161 hp (120 kW) 2.7 L C27A engine. Sedans received the new engine for 1988.

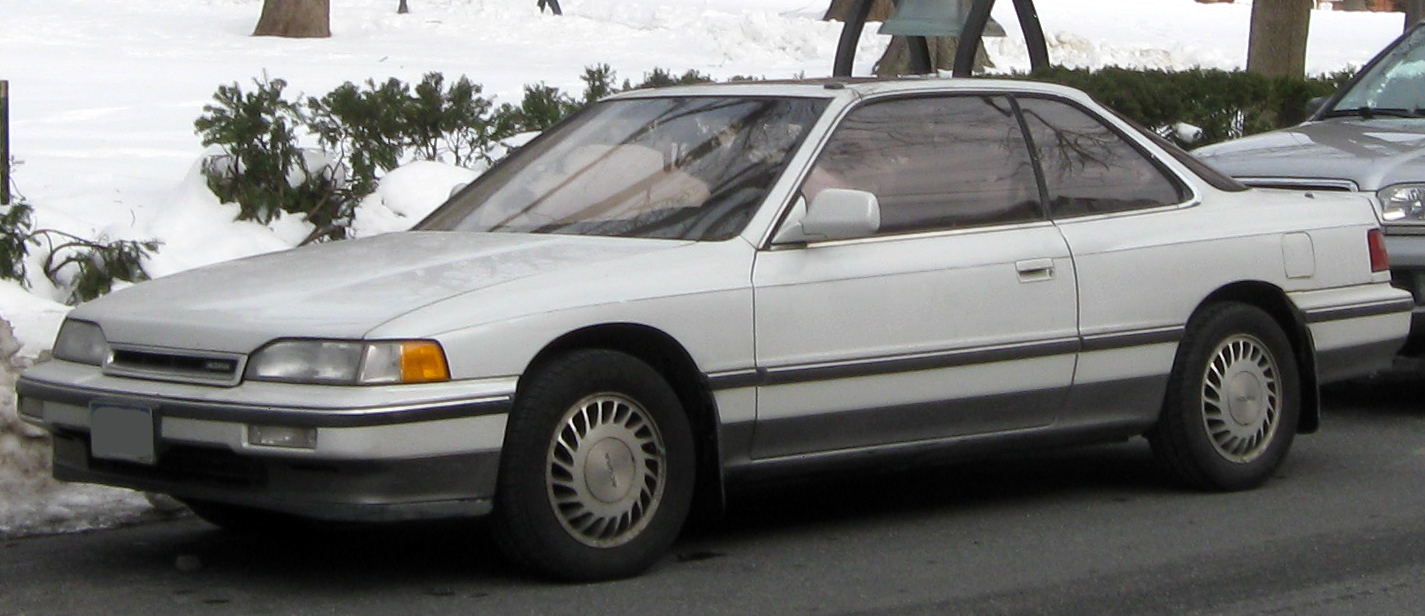
Acura Legend Coupe (US)

The Legend was the first production Honda vehicle to offer a V6 engine. The 1987 Acura Legend LS coupe would be the first Japanese car to offer a driver's side airbag. The Legend was a result of a joint venture with Britain's Austin Rover Group called Project XX that started in November 1981 with the Austin Rover-Honda XX letter of intent signed by the two companies to replace the Rover SD1 and to provide a luxury vehicle for Honda. The Rover Company had a long established reputation as a luxury car in the United Kingdom and Europe, demonstrated with the Rover P6, and Honda wanted to introduce a luxury car for both domestic Japanese and the United States markets. The joint development produced the Legend and the corresponding British version was the Rover 800-series, which was badged under the Sterling brand in the United States and competed with the Legend.

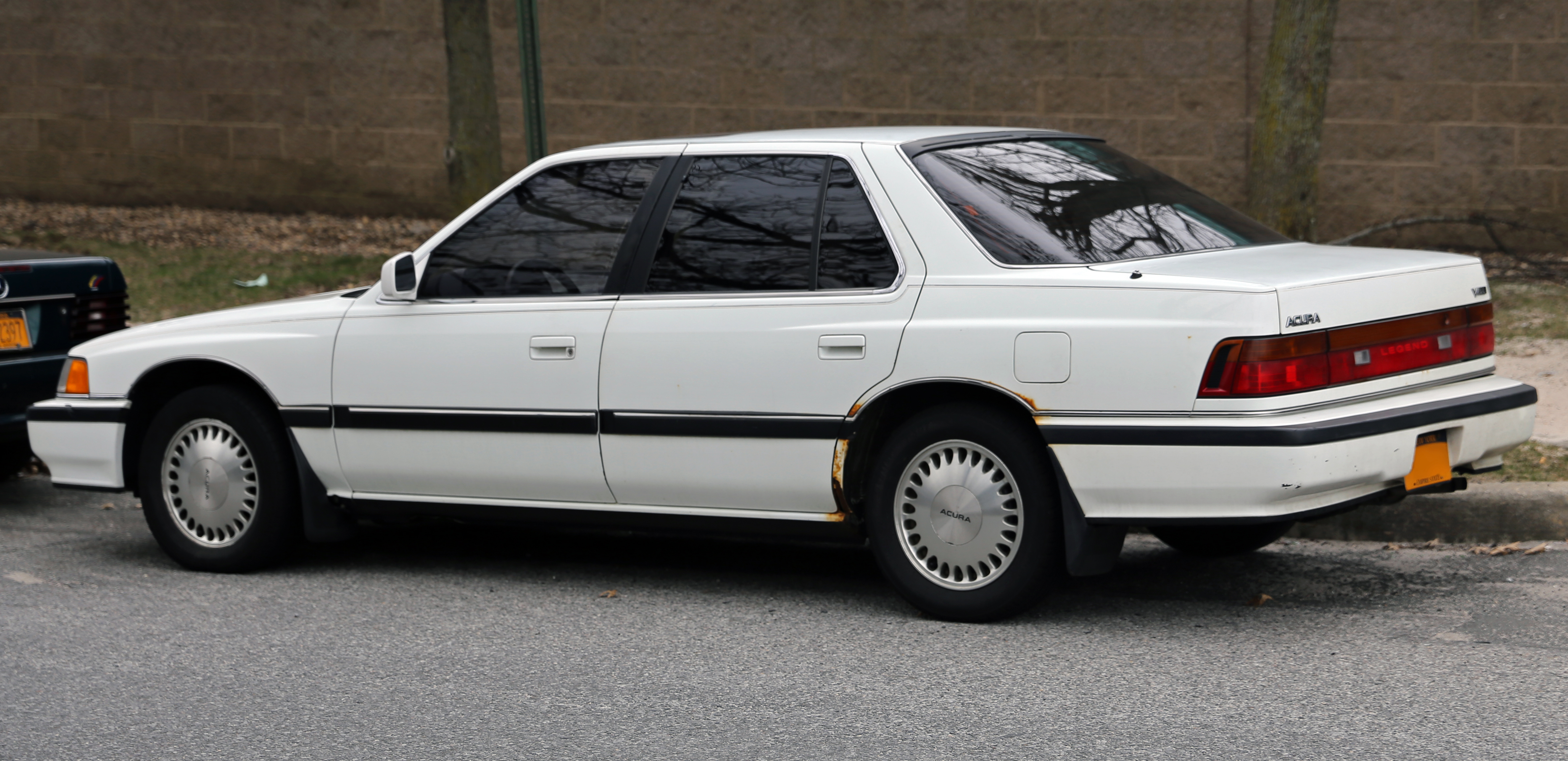
1990 Acura Legend L (US)

Rover also wanted to return to the American market when they had reportedly sold only 1,500 cars in 1971, and a brief return in 1980, selling 800 Rover SD1s by offering the Sterling.

The Legend won Car and Driver's Ten Best three years in a row and Motor Trend's Import Car of the Year for 1987. Manual-equipped models could accelerate from 0-60 mph (97 km/h) in under 8 seconds and reach a top speed of 135 mph (217 km/h). Sedan models had a drag coefficient of 0.32, while coupes were only 0.30.

When the Legend was introduced, Honda's newly established luxury car division just for the Legend was called Acura, using the advertising slogan "Precision Crafted Performance", and the Legend was offered with one factory installed option, the choice of transmission used, and one trim level. In the 1986 sales brochure, the Legend's full name used was "Legend Touring Sedan". The vehicle was virtually identical in luxury content to the Japanese market V6Zi, but was identical in size and the longer overall length of the top level V6Xi to comply with United States crash standards, using the larger 2.5 V6 engine. The Technics supplied 80W four speaker cassette tape stereo offered four user programmable equalizer settings, and was equipped with a dual diversity antenna, meaning it had a conventional extendable power antenna and an embedded antenna in the rear window. One of the novelty items was a simple volume control rocker switch and a pre-set radio station channel selector installed on the instrument binnacle within reach of the right hand; the opposite side of the instrument binnacle had a button to open, tilt or close the standard equipped glass moonroof with sun shade.

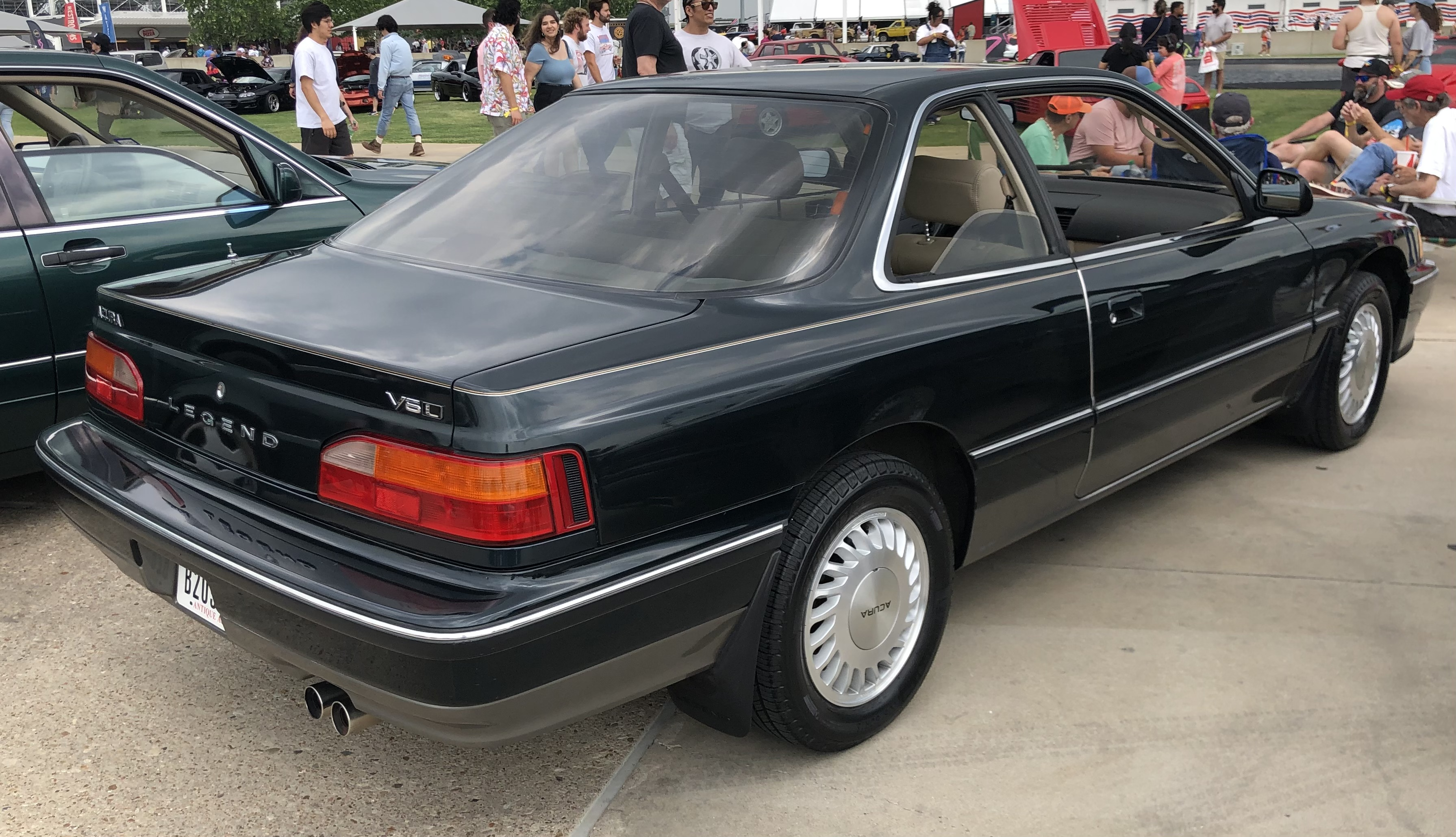
Acura Legend L coupe

The North American Legend was not offered with some of the items offered in Japan, such as automatic, one-touch climate control, and 100% wool cloth interior in brown. Blue interior was shared with Japan and North America, but brown was not offered in North America, and "sand gray" was offered instead. Exterior colors were matched to only one interior color choice and leather was not offered. Due to the success Honda had with the Legend, it served as an inspiration for the Subaru Legacy with which it shares many visual resemblances and dimensions both inside and out.

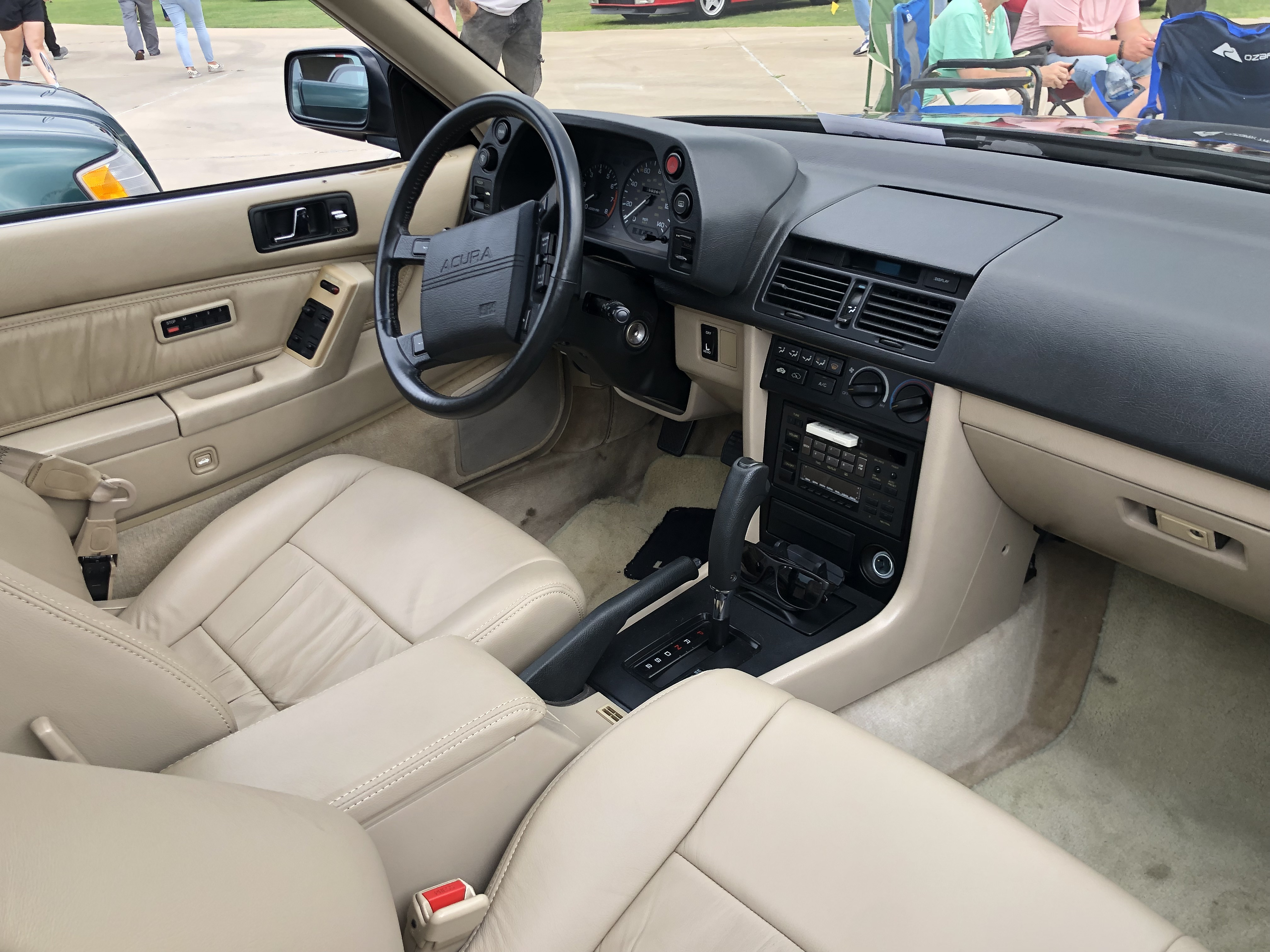
Acura Legend coupe interior

In late 1988 for the 1989 model year, the sedan received some minor tweaks, upgrading to the one-piece front headlamps already in use in Japan since the 1985 introduction, a revised front bumper, trunk lid, tail light cluster, and an upgraded double-wishbone rear suspension, with a new alloy wheel appearance. By that time all Legends came equipped with a Honda-designed 4-wheel anti-lock brake system. A driver's side airbag was now standard on all Legends. Other features such as power driver's seat memory for 3 positions were added. High-end LS models featured a trip computer, electronic vehicle monitoring system in the center console and a Bose sound system. It was also joined by the Acura Vigor which set the stage for the larger second generation Legend introduced October 1990.

For the 1990 model year, all Legends came with body-colored side mirrors. Legend coupes had a revised body-colored front grille, new red & clear tail lights, and improved front seats. LS model coupes also received a trunk-mounted lip spoiler. All LS models featured burlwood interior trim. Production of the first-generation models ended in 1990 as a second-generation version became available for the 1991 model year. At least by the 1990 model year, the fuel filler door on the sedan had been moved rearward about 15 cm (5.9 in).

From the exterior, there are only superficial similarities between the Legend and its Rover 800/Sterling cousin. Both cars share the 2.5L and 2.7L Honda engine with 160 hp (119 kW) and a 4-speed automatic transmission. The core structure and chassis design is also common to both cars, however the Rover version has its own exterior panelwork, interior and electrical systems. The Rover was also offered with a 2.0L in-line 4-cylinder engines, however the Legend was only available with V6 power regardless of market. In Japan only, Honda installed a turbocharger with variable geometry in the Legend with the smaller 2.0 L V6, called the "Wing Turbo" for model year 1989.

== Second generation (1991) ==
Second generation
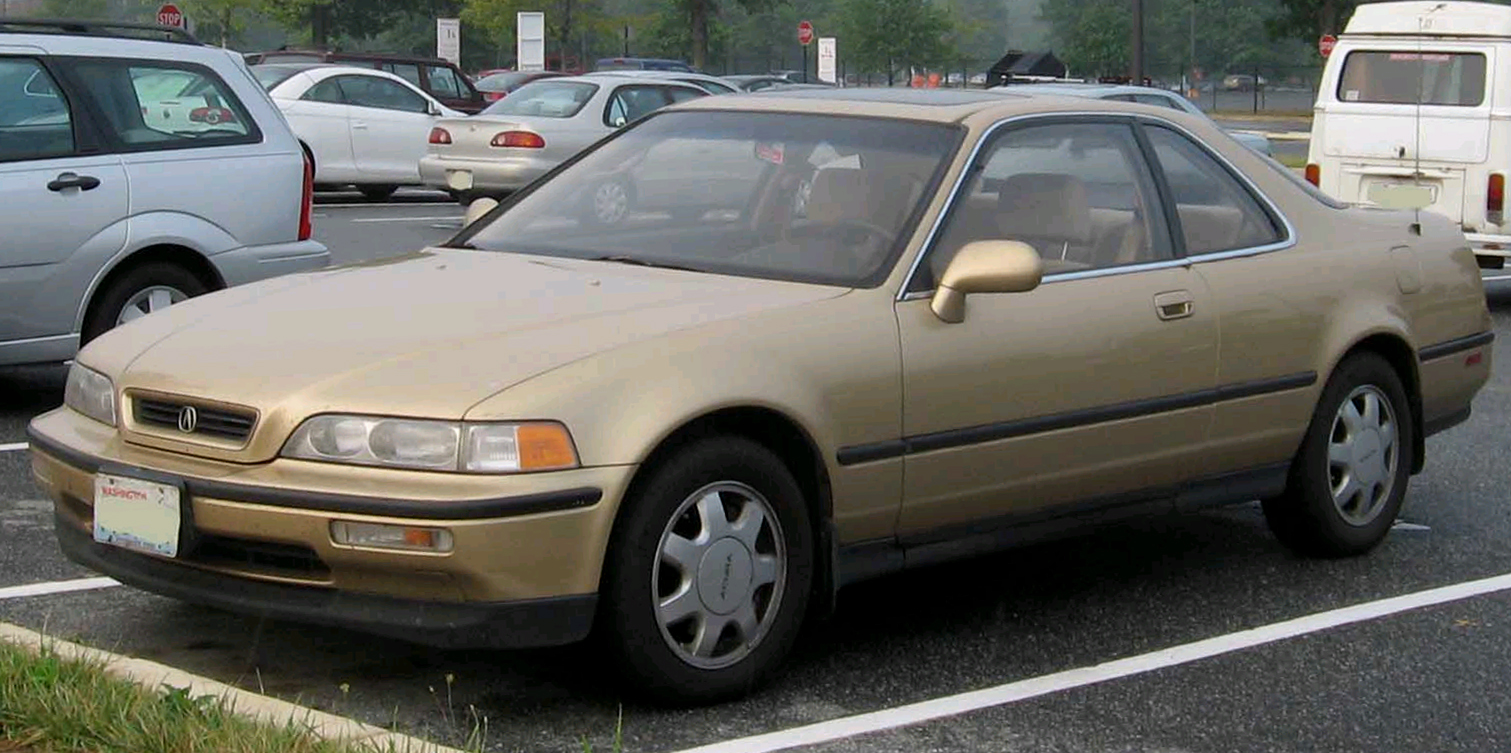
- 2nd-gen Acura Legend coupe

Overview
- Model code: KA7/KA8
- Production: 1990–1995
- Designer: Yusuke Saitoh (1988)

Body and chassis
- Layout: Longitudinal front-engine, front-wheel drive

Powertrain
- Engine: 3.2 L C32A & C32A1 V6
- Transmission: 4-Speed Automatic; 5-Speed Manual; 6-Speed Manual (Type-II)

Dimensions
- Wheelbase: Coupe: 111.4 in (2,830 mm); Sedan: 114.6 in (2,911 mm)
- Length: Sedan: 194.9 in (4,950 mm); Coupe: 192.5 in (4,890 mm)
- Width: 71.3 in (1,811 mm)
- Height: 1990–1992 Coupe: 53.5 in (1,359 mm); Sedan: 55.1 in (1,400 mm); 1993–1995 Coupe: 53.7 in (1,364 mm)

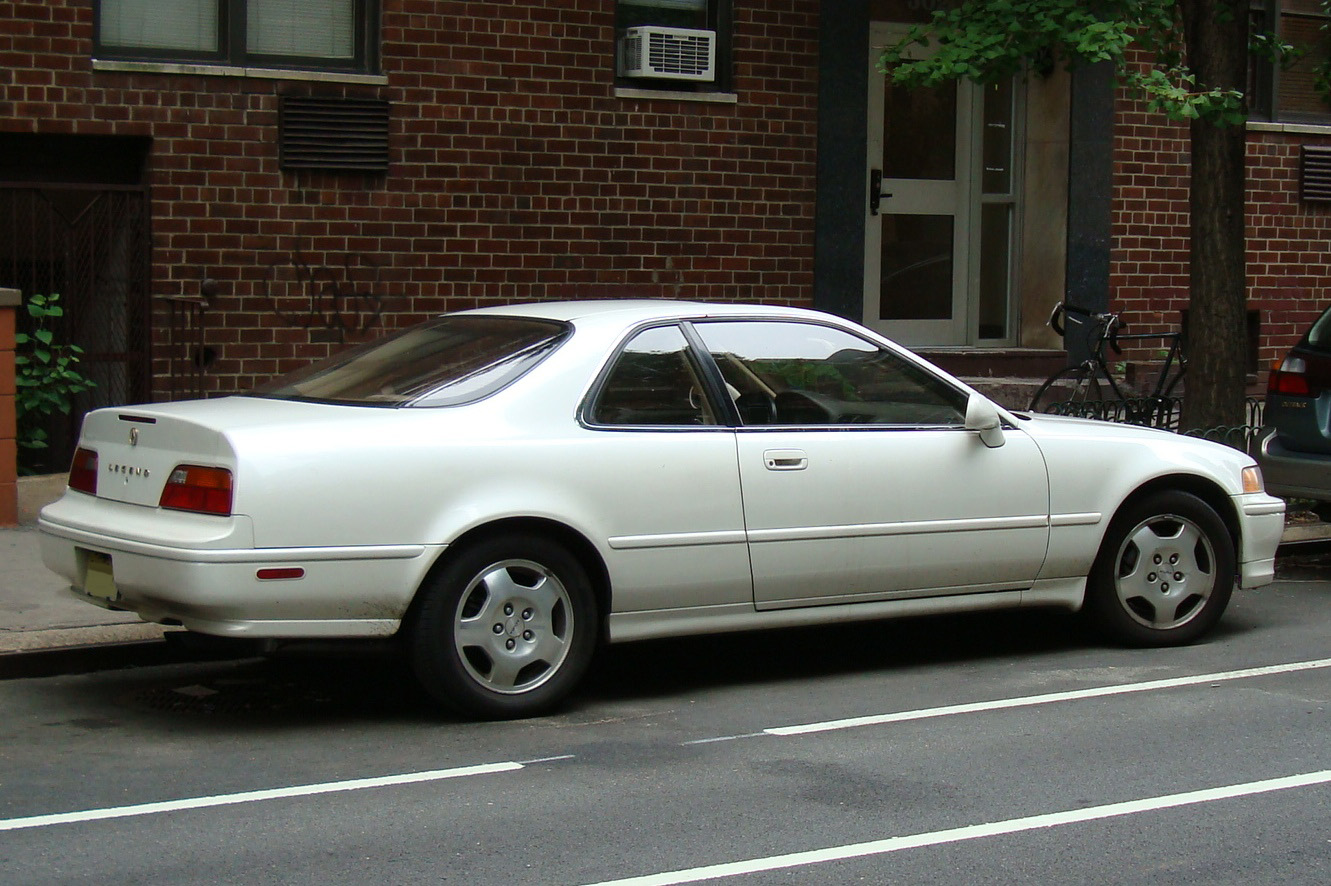
Acura Legend coupe (US)

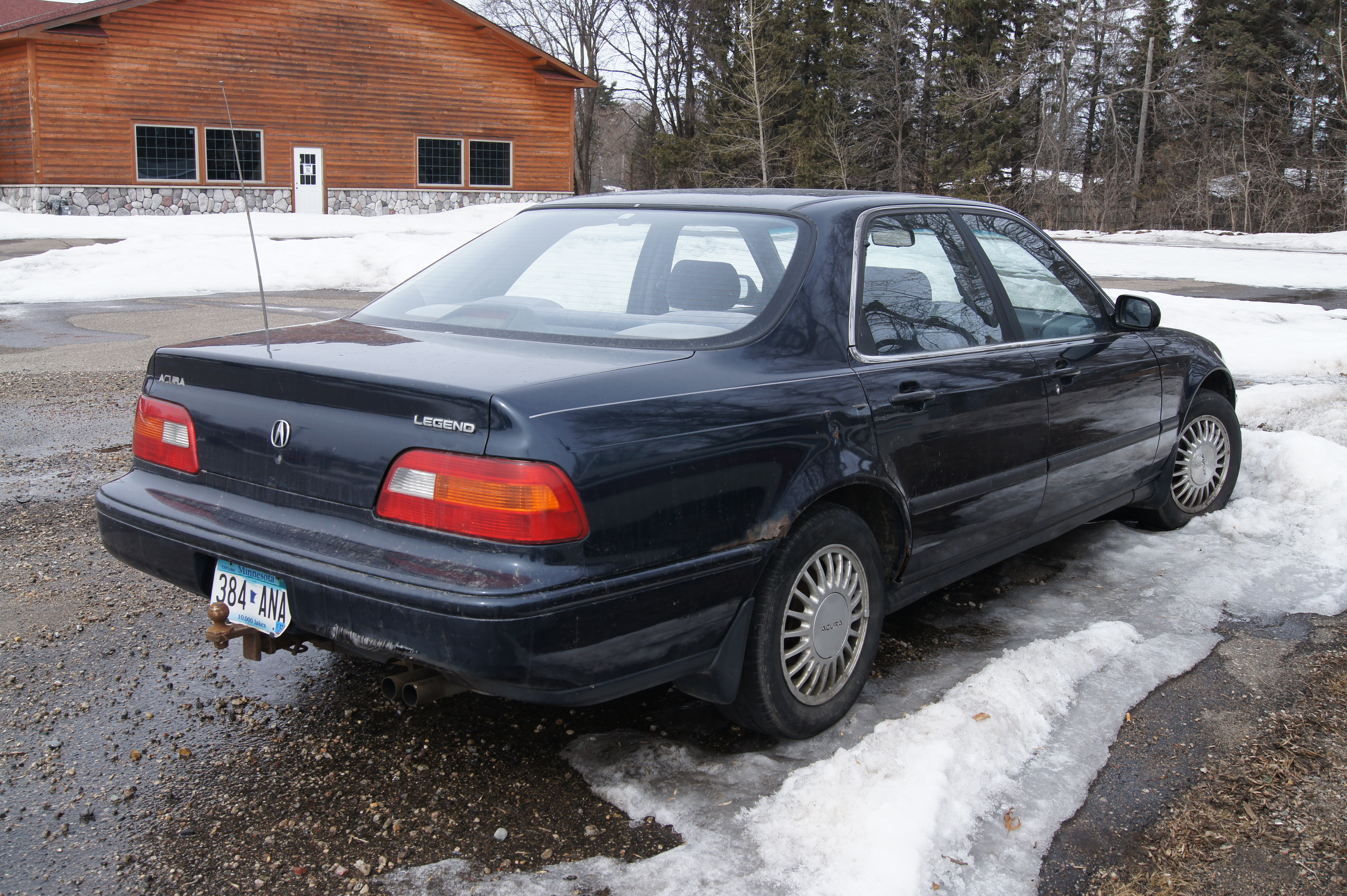
1991 Acura Legend (US)

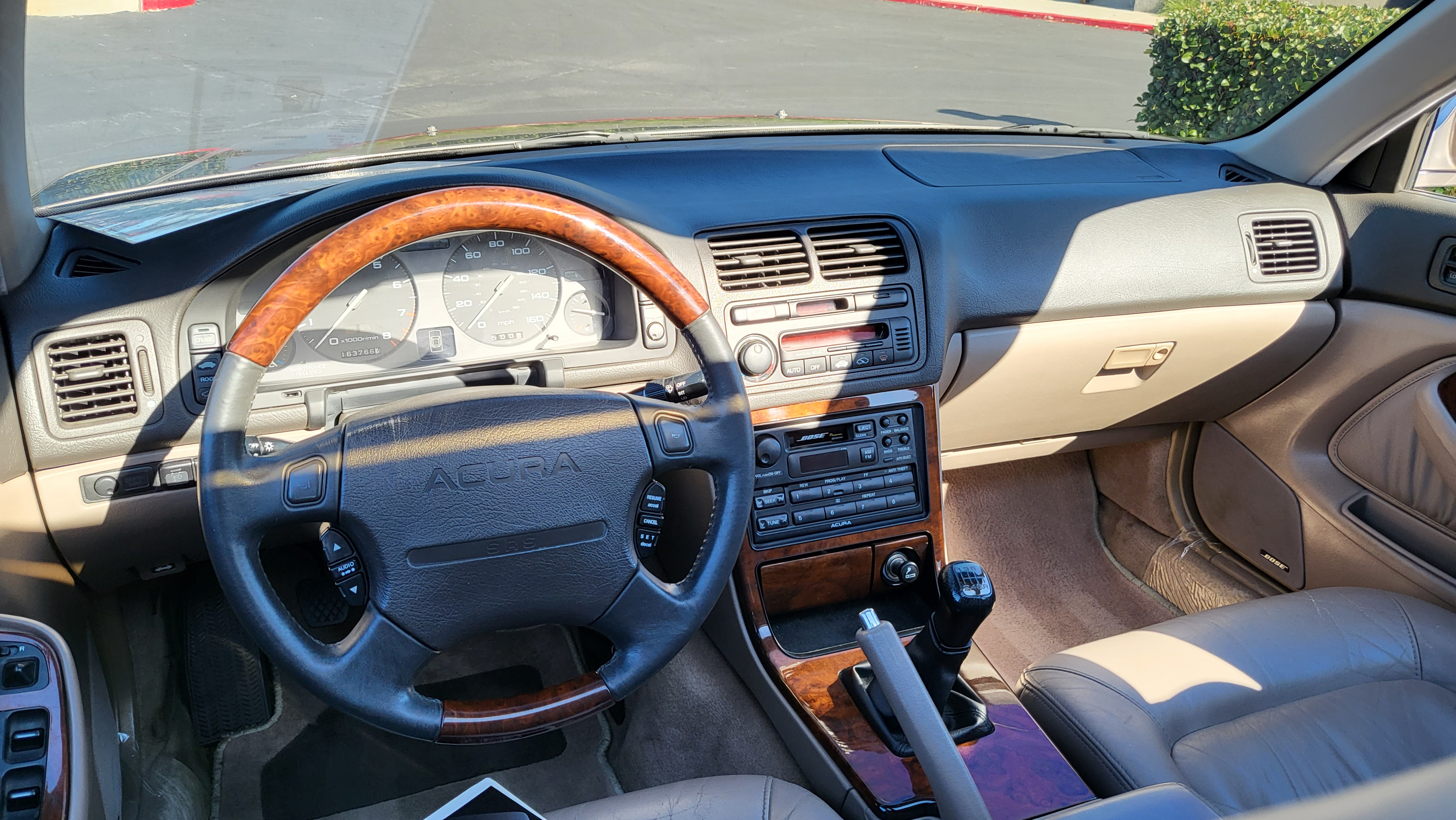
1994 Acura Legend GS sedan interior (US)

Second generation units became available October 24, 1990, now using a 200 hp (149 kW) SOHC (C32A) engine mated to either a standard 6-speed manual or an optional 4-speed automatic. The second generation Legend was a larger, more streamlined-looking car (drag coefficients were actually higher at 0.34 for sedans and 0.32 for coupes). The design was referred to as a "fuselage" shape, and had rear-wheel drive proportions which were possible thanks to the use of a longitudinally mounted engine; unusual for front-wheel-drive automobiles.

The Legend offered a host of features seen on luxury cars of today including dual front driver & passenger airbags (standard on 1991 Legend LS, 1992 L and LS trims), speed-sensitive steering, hands-free telephone, automatic climate control, heated leather seats, heated mirrors, four-wheel ABS disc brakes, seatbelt pretensioners, and electric soft-close doors (coupe only).

Japan and New Zealand coupe/sedan models came factory with one-piece headlamps and built-in foglights. In Europe the Legend was fitted with all glass headlamps as well as built-in foglights, also a flush decklid spoiler option was available from factory (1991-1993 coupes only), similar to the USDM KA3/KA4 Legend first generation coupe/sedan option. (1994-1995 coupe) rear decklids were excluded from Europe's factory flush spoiler option, as they offered a slightly enhanced curvature of decklid in the later production years.

Japan, New Zealand and Europe coupe/sedan models also came fitted with a one of a kind Honda alpha touring grille. North American models did not, however they did receive a factory option set of lower bumper guard foglights making all legend model interchangeable options endless.

Appearance of the sedan was adopted from the first generation Legend coupe and Honda also wanted to visually align the appearance of both the Legend coupe and sedan to the Acura NSX. Legend coupes also shared the same mirror design as the first generation NSX. The segment the Legend originally filled was now being served by the Acura Vigor which allowed the Legend to position itself more towards the rear drive Lexus LS and the Infiniti Q45 sedans. Honda decided not to upgrade the size of the engine to a V8 because it would have upstaged the Acura NSX which has a V6 that introduced Honda's VTEC technology.

For 1991 and 1992 the Legend sedan was available in 'base', 'L', and 'LS' trims; the coupe remained available in L and LS through its entire run. The higher-end LS cars added automatic climate control, a power four-way passenger seat, burled walnut interior trim, and body colored side moldings. Honda made significant upgrades for 1993, making a 230 hp (172 kW) Type II North America version of the SOHC C32A1 engine standard on all coupes, along with the option of a 6-speed manual transmission (for 1993-1995 coupes 1994-1995 sedan). The LS version of the sedan lost the option for a manual transmission and was only available with an automatic transmission from then on. 1993 also saw the addition of dual airbags as standard equipment in all trims, the deletion of the black molding on the entry-level cars, and a new wheel design with fewer spokes on the sedans (16-spoke vs. 20-spoke). To reach the higher output, the Type II engine has bigger intake valves, a higher lift camshaft, and an exhaust with freer flow.

For the 1994–95 model years, all Legends received new front bumper and trunk lid designs, a new front grille (L & LS Sedans only), and a power tilt-telescoping steering column; the word "Legend" was now spelled out in individual letters on the back. The base sedan was dropped, while a new GS sedan became the new top-line variant, sporting the 230 hp (172 kW) Type II engine, upgraded brakes from the coupe, sport suspension from the coupe, a body-colored version of the 1991 to 1993 grille, the same standard 6-speed manual transmission found on the coupes as well as the special 16-inch 5-spoke LS Coupe wheels (better known as GS Wheels). This was the only 6-speed sedan offered.

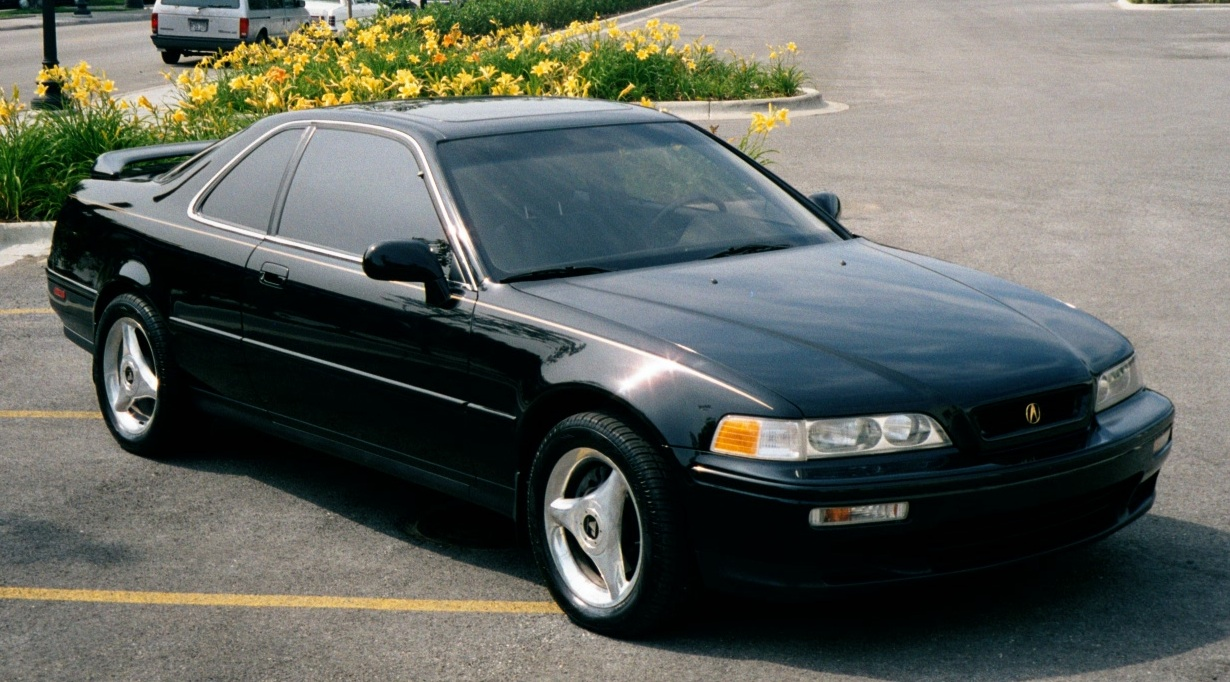
1995 Acura Legend Coupe L Series with aftermarket wheels

Added for 1995 was the limited-production 'SE' sedan, which was essentially a Legend 'L' with a two-tone paint scheme, pre-1993 15-inch 7-spoke 'LS' coupe wheels, "Special Edition" floor mats, and an automatic transmission.

== Successor ==
The Legend was a very successful vehicle to launch Acura as a separate division, and combined with sales of the Integra this resulted in Acura outselling longtime luxury marques BMW and Mercedes-Benz as well as Toyota's new luxury division Lexus. Nonetheless Honda executives felt that the Legend nameplate was overshadowing the Acura marque in the United States, plus other luxury marques like Mercedes-Benz and BMW used alphanumeric designations, hence the third-generation Legend sedan would be badged as the RL for North America. The replacement for the Legend sedan was sold as the Acura RL for two generations and then the Acura RLX in North America, although Honda continued to sell it as the Legend in most other areas of the world. However the RL and RLX never achieved the sales success that the original Legend managed; by the early 2000s Acura sales would be dominated by the Acura MDX crossover 3-row SUV and the Acura TL front-wheel drive sedan while the RL contributed little, by contrast the Legend made up 40% of the marque's sales volume during Acura's early years. It can be said that the renaming of the Legend to the RL, as well as Honda's refusal to adopt a front-engine rear-wheel drive layout which typify the more expensive luxury cars, had hurt sales of the RL and other Acura passenger cars.

== Sales ==
Calendar year	Total US sales
1986	25,062
1987	54,713
1988	70,770
1989	64,638
1990	53,666
1991	65,689
1992	49,926
1993	38,866
1994	35,709
1995	18,259
1996	629
1997	4

== See also ==
- Honda Legend

== Sources ==
Information added to the first generation Legend was compiled from a 1986 Japanese language Honda Legend brochure, a Japanese market Honda Legend Press Information brochure dated October 22, 1985, and a North American Acura Legend sales brochure dated 1986 by American Honda Motor Company.

- Dawson, Chester (2004). Lexus: The Relentless Pursuit. Hoboken, NJ: Jon Wiley & Sons. ISBN 0-470-82110-8.
