= Honda Ridgeline (second generation) =

Second generation of Honda Ridgeline

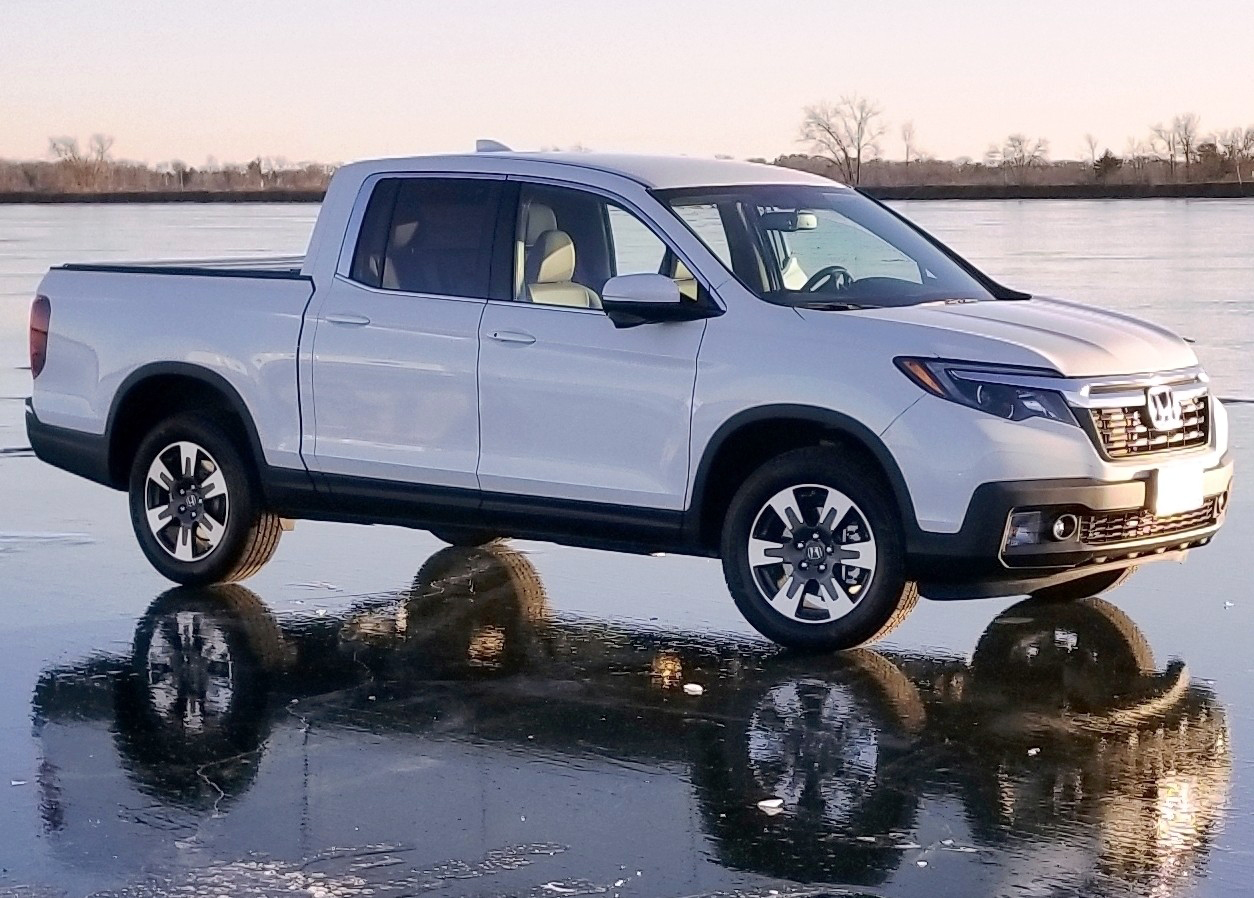
- 2018 Honda Ridgeline RTL-T

Overview
- Manufacturer: Honda
- Model code: YK2/3
- Also called: Honda Pilot Ridgeline (Colombia)
- Production: May 2016–present
- Model years: 2017–present
- Assembly: United States: Lincoln, Alabama (HMA)

Body and chassis
- Class: Mid-size pickup truck
- Body style: 4-door pickup
- Layout: Front-engine, front-wheel drive or four-wheel drive
- Platform: Honda GLTP
- Related: Honda Pilot; Honda Passport

Powertrain
- Engine: 3.5 L J35Y6 V6
- Power output: 280 hp (284 PS; 209 kW)
- Transmission: 6-speed H6 automatic (2017-2019); 9-speed ZF 9HP automatic (2020-present)

Dimensions
- Wheelbase: 125.2 in (3,180 mm)
- Length: 210.0 in (5,334 mm)
- Width: 78.6 in (1,996 mm)
- Height: 70.2–70.8 in (1,783–1,798 mm)
- Curb weight: 4,242–4,515 lb (1,924–2,048 kg)

Chronology
- Predecessor: Honda Ridgeline (first generation)

The Honda Ridgeline (YK2/YK3) is the second generation of mid-size pickup truck manufactured by Honda under the Ridgeline nameplate. The second generation Ridgeline took a different approach in design from the first generation Ridgeline by using Honda's new "global light truck platform," found in the third generation Honda Pilot as well as other large Honda vehicles, and made modifications such as:

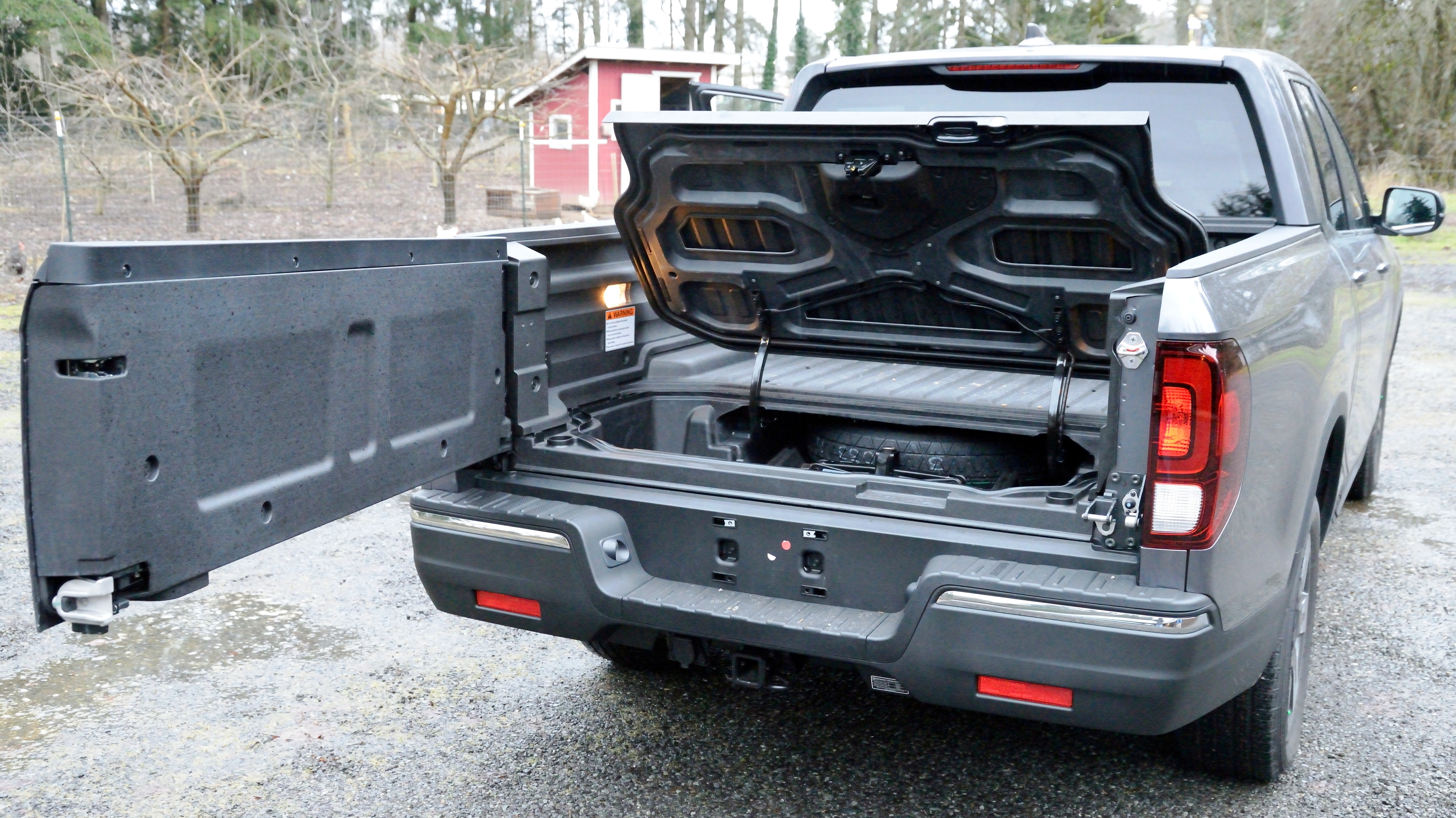
2017 Ridgeline RTL with dual–action tailgate opened laterally 80° and the in–bed trunk opened

- Modifying various parts to support hauling, towing, on road and off-road use
- Incorporating notable features from the first generation, such as the dual–action tailgate and in–bed trunk
- Adding new features, such as Honda's truck bed audio system (No longer available since 2023 for the 2024 model year.)

Despite these modifications, Honda said the second generation Ridgeline shares 73% of its components with the third generation Pilot.

With the mixed success of the first generation Ridgeline, Honda posted "an open letter from the company's head of truck product planning, denying rumors that the Ridgeline would be dropped and insisting that a pickup truck will remain part of the company's portfolio." With that proclamation, Honda committed to the development of a new Ridgeline. After a one-year hiatus in Ridgeline production, the second generation of the mid-size truck went on sale in June 2016 as a 2017 model-year vehicle. According to Honda, the Ridgeline was not designed to steal sales from the more traditional trucks sold in North America, but was developed to "give the 18% of Honda owners who also own pickups a chance to make their garages a Honda-only parking area."

== Design ==
According to Autoline and Automotive News, Honda's research clinics found that buyers made assumptions about toughness and payload based on the gaps between the tires and the truck's wheel arches, the vehicle's stance, and whether or not it had a tow hitch. Jim Loftus, the second generation Ridgeline's Performance Lead Engineer, said, "Those things were honestly kind of 'aha' moments or big surprises to us as a project team..." So the team, led by Large Project Leader and Chief Engineer Kerry McClure, went back and incorporated all of those messages into their next-generation pickup. In November 2015, Honda presented its new Ridgeline Baja Race Truck at the 2015 SEMA Show, giving the public some insight into the design language that would be used in the next-generation Ridgeline. Two months later, at the North American International Auto Show, Honda unveiled the production version of the second generation frame without buttressing.

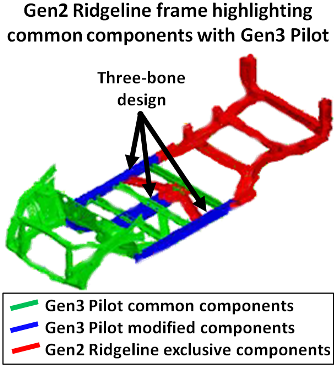

Honda's new global light truck platform, specifically the third generation Pilot and the 2019–present Honda Passport, includes many features and capabilities that are shared with the second generation Ridgeline which are uncommon for mid-size pickups, such as:

- Intelligent traction management—which offers different drive modes normal and snow for front-wheel drive (FWD) and adds mud and sand for all-wheel drive (AWD) that adjusts throttle mapping, shift points, power distribution, and Vehicle Stability Assist (VSA) responses—(all models):,
  1. Snow mode: Throttle input is made less aggressive to minimize pedal travel and make launching easier
  2. Mud mode: Throttle input is made more aggressive, torque vectoring is disabled, more power is sent to the rear wheels, the transmission delays upshifts, and traction control allows for more wheel-slip
  3. Sand mode: Similar to mud mode but with more aggressive setting, maximum rear-wheel bias
- Economy assist—which adjusts engine performance, throttle response, cruise control, and climate control reactions—(all models)
- Hill start assist—which prevents the vehicle from rolling backward when the driver switches from the brake to the accelerator while stopped on a hill—(all models)
- Honda Sensing—which consists of a suite of systems (collision mitigation braking system, forward collision warning, lane keeping assist system, road departure mitigation, lane departure warning, and adaptive cruise control)—(select models)
- Blind spot information system with rear cross-traffic monitor—which helps the driver with blind spots around the vehicle—(select models)
- Motion-adaptive electric power steering—which gives the driver steering inputs to correct vehicle direction in turns and in slippery road conditions—(all models)
- MacPherson strut front suspension—but with heavier-duty knuckles, hubs, and bearings—(all models)
- Multi-link rear suspension with tubular stabilizer bar—but with heavier-duty knuckles and control arms—(all models)
- Amplitude reactive dampers—although modified for truck duty, these dampers have two hydraulic circuits, one tuned for ride quality and one for large/harsh undulations—(all models)
- Tire fill assist—which provides audio and visual alerts to users when correct air pressure is reached during inflation—(all models)
- Tri-zone climate control—which provides different climate settings for the driver, front-passenger, and rear-passengers—(select models)

=== Differences from the First generation Ridgeline ===
Some Gen2 Ridgeline's composite bed components

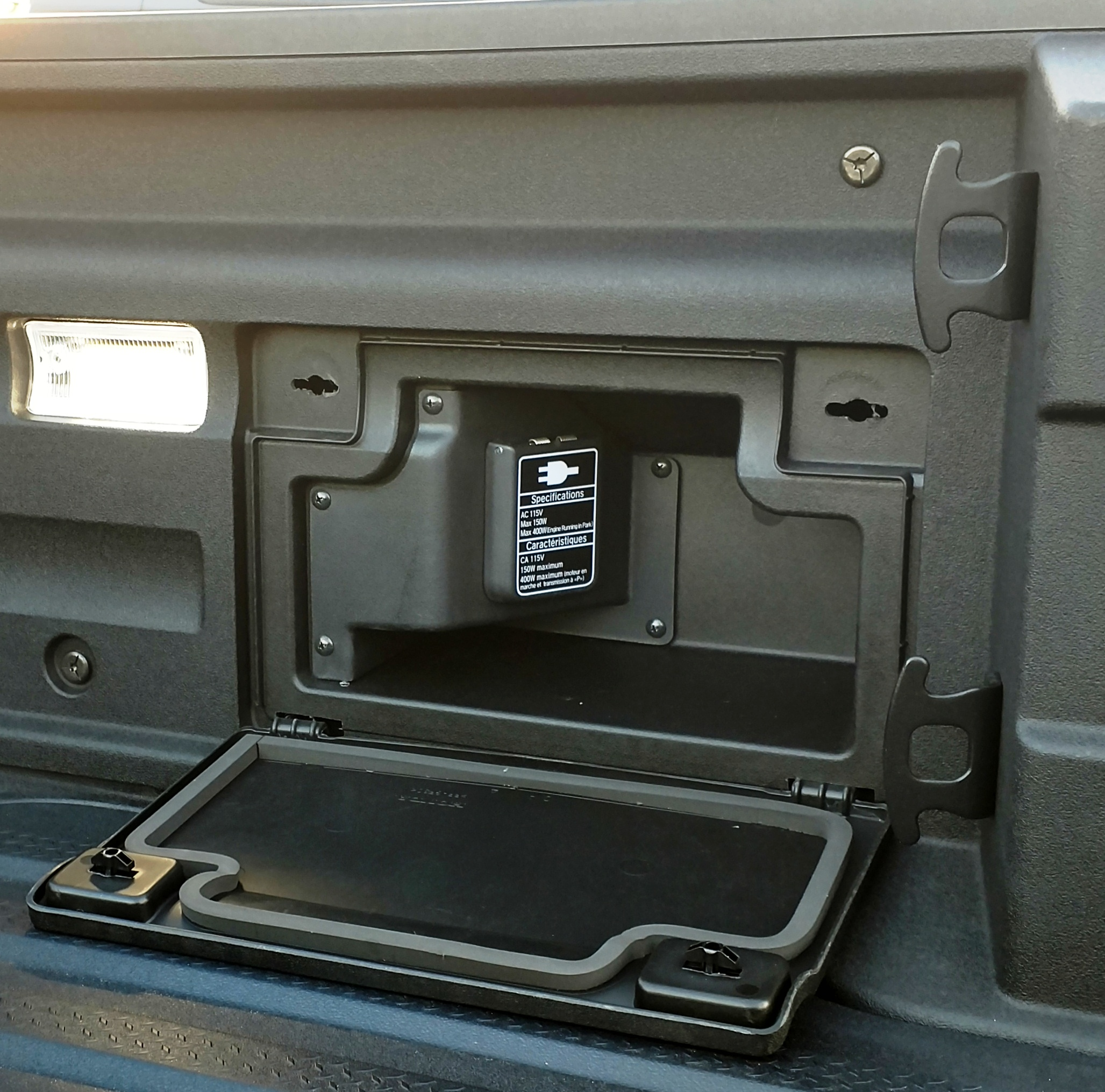
If equipped, the right-rear bed compartment will house the AC outlet with sufficient space to store a power-tool charging station (2018 RTL-E)

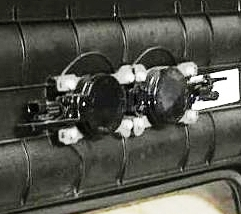
If equipped with the truck bed audio system, the backside of each bed panel will have mounted special exciters that turn them into audio speakers (2017 RTL-E)

Standard features included a bed-mounted 115 volt (V)/150–400 watt (W) alternating current (AC) inverter and carryover features included an in-bed trunk and flat cabin floor. The bed featured an integrated audio system, controllable via a Bluetooth-enabled smartphone. Weight dropped by 78 lb (35 kg). The C-pillar and rear sub-frame were strengthened giving the second generation 28% more torsional rigidity over the first generation Ridgeline. Noise, vibration, and harshness improvements included active noise cancellation, active control engine mounts, and an available acoustic windshield.

AWD models offered the same or improved hauling and towing performance compared to the first generation, for example:

- Same published weight limits of 1,100 lb (500 kg) in the bed, 300 lb (140 kg) dynamically on the tailgate, 165 lb (75 kg) on the roof, and 5,000 lb (2,300 kg) towing, but this time it was reportedly built to meet the Society of Automotive Engineers (SAE) J2807 standard
- An increase in rear seat storage with 2.9 cu ft (82.1 L) in under-seat storage and 50.2 cu ft (1,421.5 L) in overall second row storage, a 518 cu in (8.5 L) and 8.8 cu ft (249.2 L) increase respectively
- A bigger bed at:
  - 5.3 ft (1.6 m) long with tailgate up, an increase of 3.9 in (10 cm)
  - 6.9 ft (2.1 m) long with tailgate down, an increase of 3.6 in (9 cm)
  - 5 ft (1.5 m) wide, an increase of 4.8 in (12 cm)
  - 4.2 ft (1.3 m) wide between the wheel wells and D-pillars, an increase of 0.5 in (1.3 cm)
- A non-painted and textured steel-reinforced sheet molding composite bed—developed by Continental Structural Plastics— that is reportedly stronger than its competitor's

Power and torque comparison between the 2009–2014 J35Z5 and the 2017–2022 J35Y6 engines

- A similar J-series 3.5 L (212 cu in) 60° aluminum alloy V6 engine design with belt-driven single overhead camshafts, 24-valves, and an aluminum variable-length intake manifold but this version has:
  - 11.5 : 1 compression
  - Direct injection
  - Intelligent variable valve timing & lift electronic control (i-VTEC)
  - Variable displacement (from six to three cylinders when not under load)
  - Producing 280 hp (284 PS; 209 kW) and 262 lb⋅ft (355 N⋅m), in increase of 30 to 33 hp (30 to 33 PS; 22 to 25 kW) and 15 to 17 lb⋅ft (20 to 23 N⋅m) depending on model year
  - 87 AKI gasoline for all driving conditions
- A 150 Amperes (A) alternator (up 20 A from the first generation) with a battery management system that optimizes alternator use, extends battery life, and prevents unintended battery drains
- A new transmission with:
  - Six versus five forward gears with a 24.5% lower first gear, a 20.2% lower reverse gear, and a 3.3% higher top (overdrive) gear with an overall 20% wider gear spread
  - Reduced friction
  - new lock-up clutch
- A new AWD system (I-VTM4) that is:
  - Hydraulically actuated
  - 22% lighter
  - Able to handle 20% more torque
  - Able to dynamically distribute torque between the left and right rear-wheels
  - Capable of overdriving the outside rear wheel by 2.7% (a.k.a. torque vectoring)
- Amplitude reactive dampers—that reportedly hold up better under severe stress—as well as stronger and/or larger knuckles, hubs, bearings, and control arms
- Improved brake ventilation with a 23% reduction in drag
- A steering ratio reduction of 15% at 15.95 : 1
- A rear-view camera with wide, normal, and top-down viewing angles with guidelines (guidelines morph based on steering angle on 8 in (20 cm) touchscreen models)

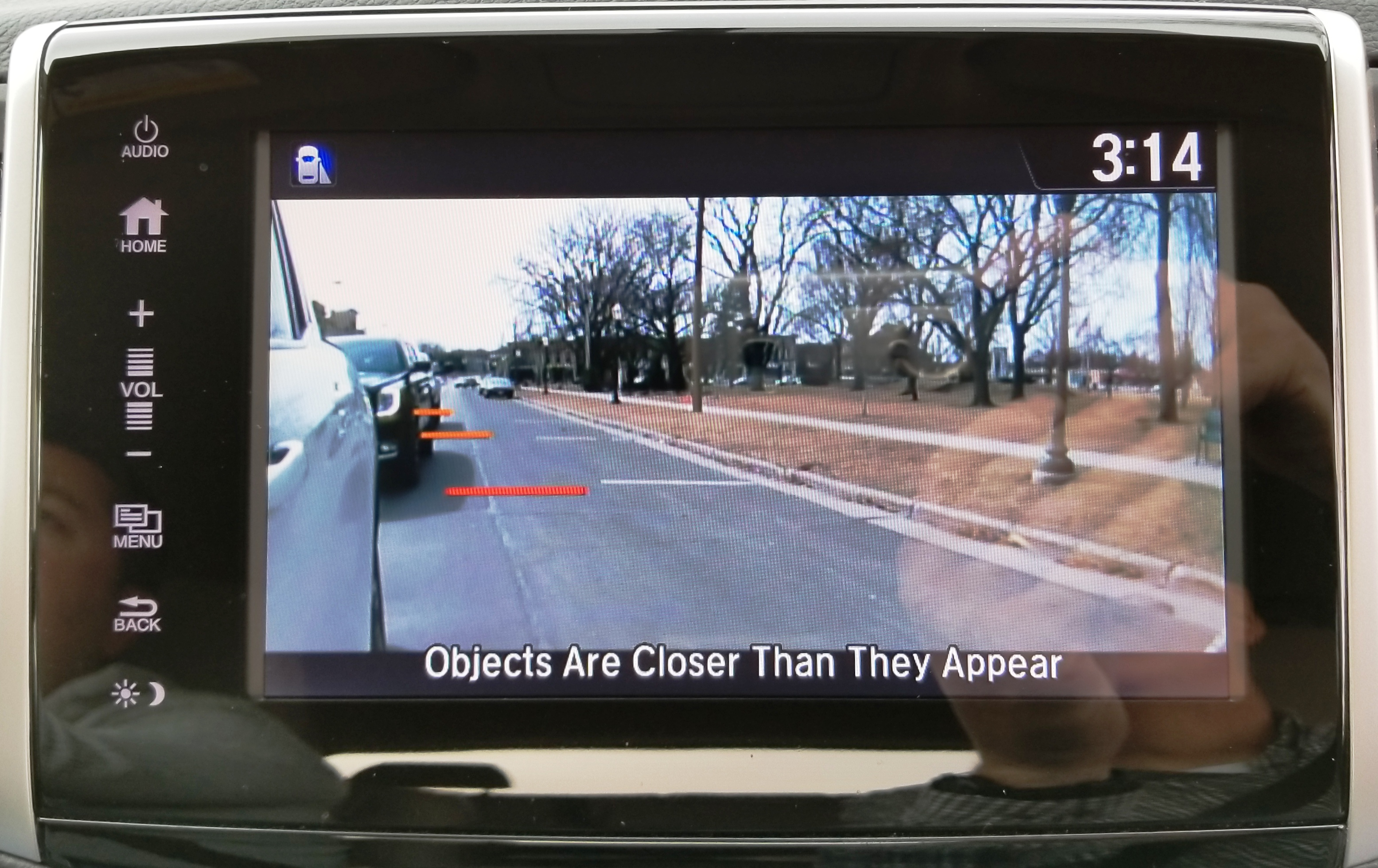
LaneWatch's 80° field of view provides four times more visibility than traditional side-view mirrors; 10 ft (3 m), 36 ft (11 m), and 78 ft (24 m) guidelines help driver's judge distance behind the rear bumper assisting lane changes, especially when towing.

- A LaneWatch camera that enhances the driver's view along the right side of the vehicle
- An auto-tilting side-view mirror, for close-in visibility when backing up
- A trailer stability assist system
- If equipped, light-emitting diode (LED) projector headlights that add 100 ft (30.5 m) in beam-depth and 35 ft (10.7 m) in beam-width over traditional headlights
- 15 percent lower drag area according to CFD simulations
- Improved fuel economy of:
  - City: 3 to 4 mpg_{‑us} (EPA) and -2.4 to -3.3 L/100 km (NRCan)
  - Highway: 5 to 6 mpg_{‑us} (EPA) and -1.8 to -2.4 L/100 km (NRCan)
  - Combined: 4 mpg_{‑us} (EPA) and -2.1 to -2.9 L/100 km (NRCan)

EPA and NRCan fuel economy ratings for the 2017–2019 Ridgeline
Categories	EPA		NRCan
Categories	FWD	AWD	AWD
City	19 mpg_{‑us}	18 mpg_{‑us}	12.8 L/100 km
Highway	26 mpg_{‑us}	25 mpg_{‑us}	9.5 L/100 km
Combined	22 mpg_{‑us}	21 mpg_{‑us}	11.3 L/100 km

Generational differences in the Ridgeline's in–bed trunk design

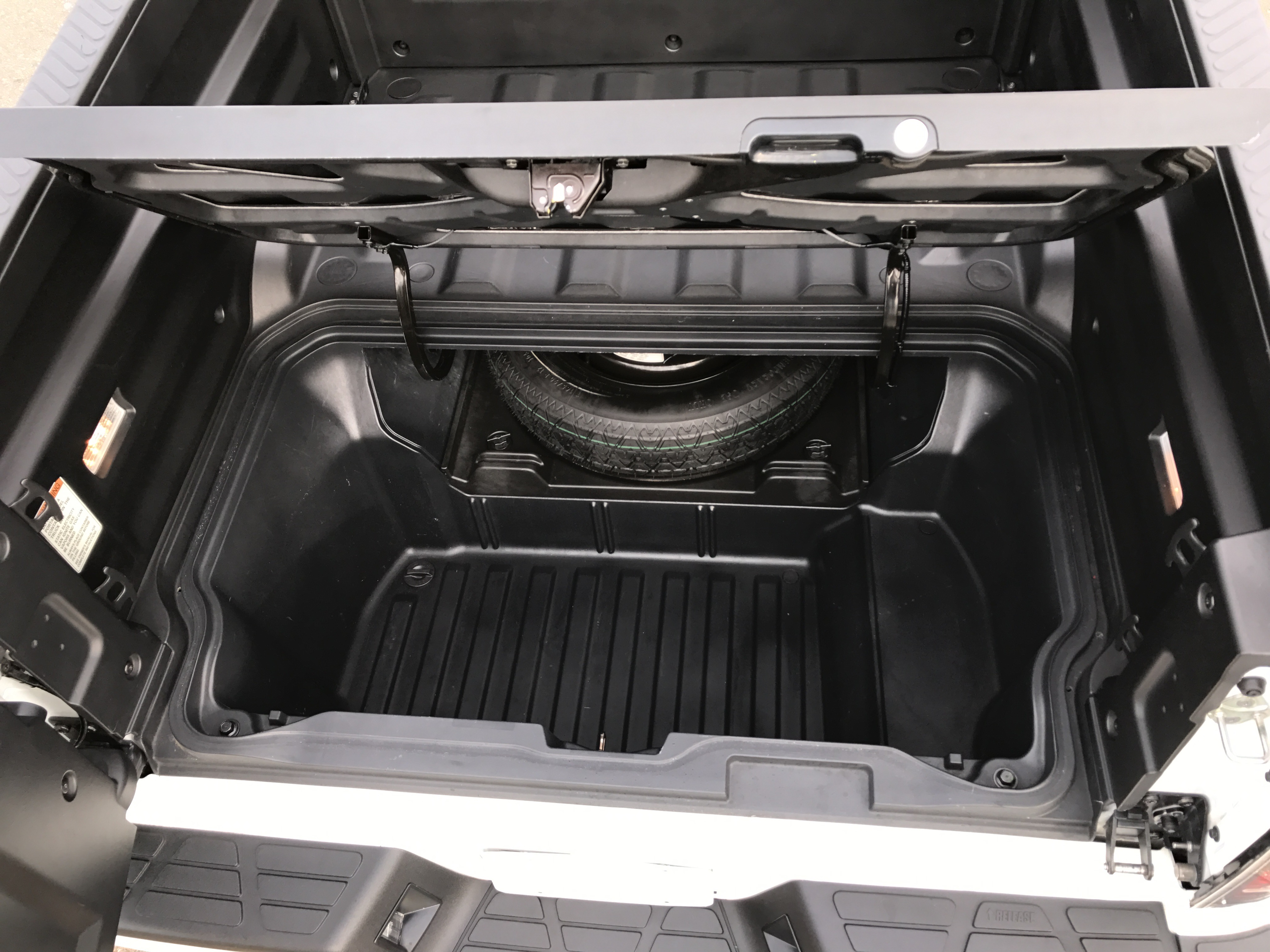
Gen1 Ridgeline in–bed trunk (2014 RTL)

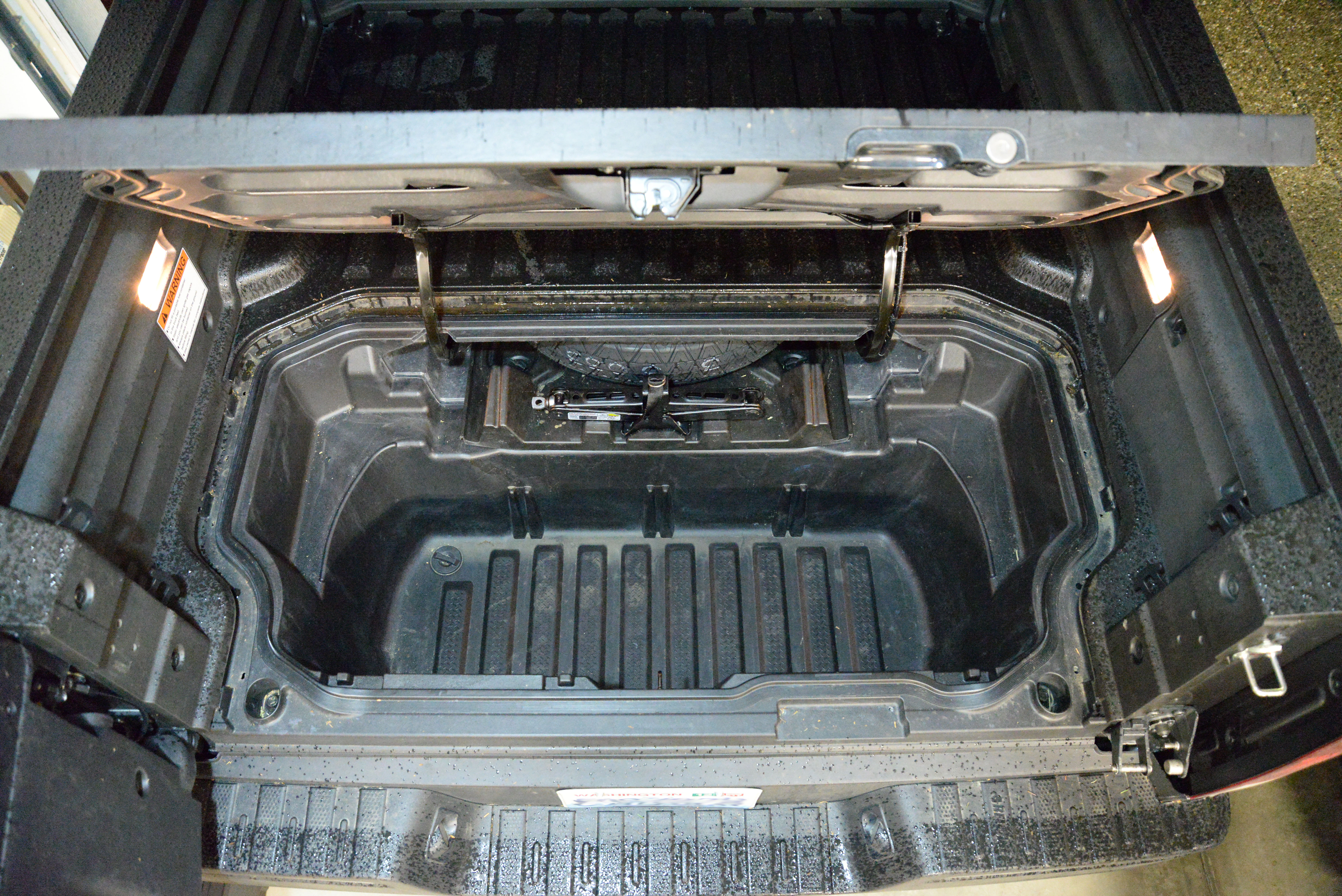
Gen2 Ridgeline in–bed trunk (2017 RTL)

Despite the Gen2 Ridgeline's smaller in–bed trunk, Honda states its shape is more conducive to hauling large items, such as an 82 US qt (78 L) cooler versus the Gen1 Ridgeline's ability to store a 72 US qt (68 L) cooler, despite the Gen1's larger volume

Despite these improvements, the second generation Ridgeline does have numerical disadvantages from the first generation, such as:

- AWD and FWD gross combined weight rating of 9,987 lb (4,530 kg) and 8,201 lb (3,720 kg), a reduction of 98 lb (44 kg) and 1,884 lb (855 kg) respectively
- AWD and FWD gross vehicle weight rating of 6,019 lb (2,730 kg) and 5,710 lb (2,590 kg), a reduction of 31 lb (14 kg) and 340 lb (150 kg) respectively
- Payload capacities of 1,444 lb (655 kg) (top trim) to 1,543 lb (700 kg) (base trim), a reduction of 31 lb (14 kg) to 16 lb (7.3 kg) respectively
- Passenger volume of 109.7 cu ft (3,106.4 L), a reduction of 2.3 cu ft (65.1 L)
- 13.0 in (33.0 cm) solid rear disc brakes, a reduction of 0.1 in (2.5 mm)
- A shallower bed
- Less bed illumination
- A smaller but deeper in–bed trunk at 7.3 cu ft (206.7 L), a reduction of 1.2 cu ft (34.0 L)
- Shallower spare tire storage, preventing the storing of a full-size spare; however—like the first generation Ridgeline—there is a hidden auxiliary tire mount integrated into the left-side of the forward bed panel which can accommodate a full-size spare tire
- Less ground clearance
  - FWD = 7.3 in (19 cm) with approach, breakover, and departure angles of 19.2°, 18.5°, and 21.4°; a reduction of 0.9 in (2 cm), 5.3°, 2.5°, and 0.6° respectively
  - AWD = 7.9 in (20 cm) with approach, breakover, and departure angles of 20.1°, 19.6°, and 22.1°; a reduction of 0.3 in (1 cm), 4.4°, 1.4°, and 0° respectively
- A larger turning radius at 44.4 ft (13.5 m), an increase of 1.8 ft (0.5 m)
- A smaller fuel tank at 19.5 US gal (74 L; 16 imp gal), a reduction of 2.5 US gal (9 L; 2 imp gal)
- No power steering cooler

=== Equipment ===
For the US market, the second generation Ridgeline was initially offered in seven different trim levels: RT, RTS, Sport, RTL, RTL-T, RTL-E, and Black Edition.

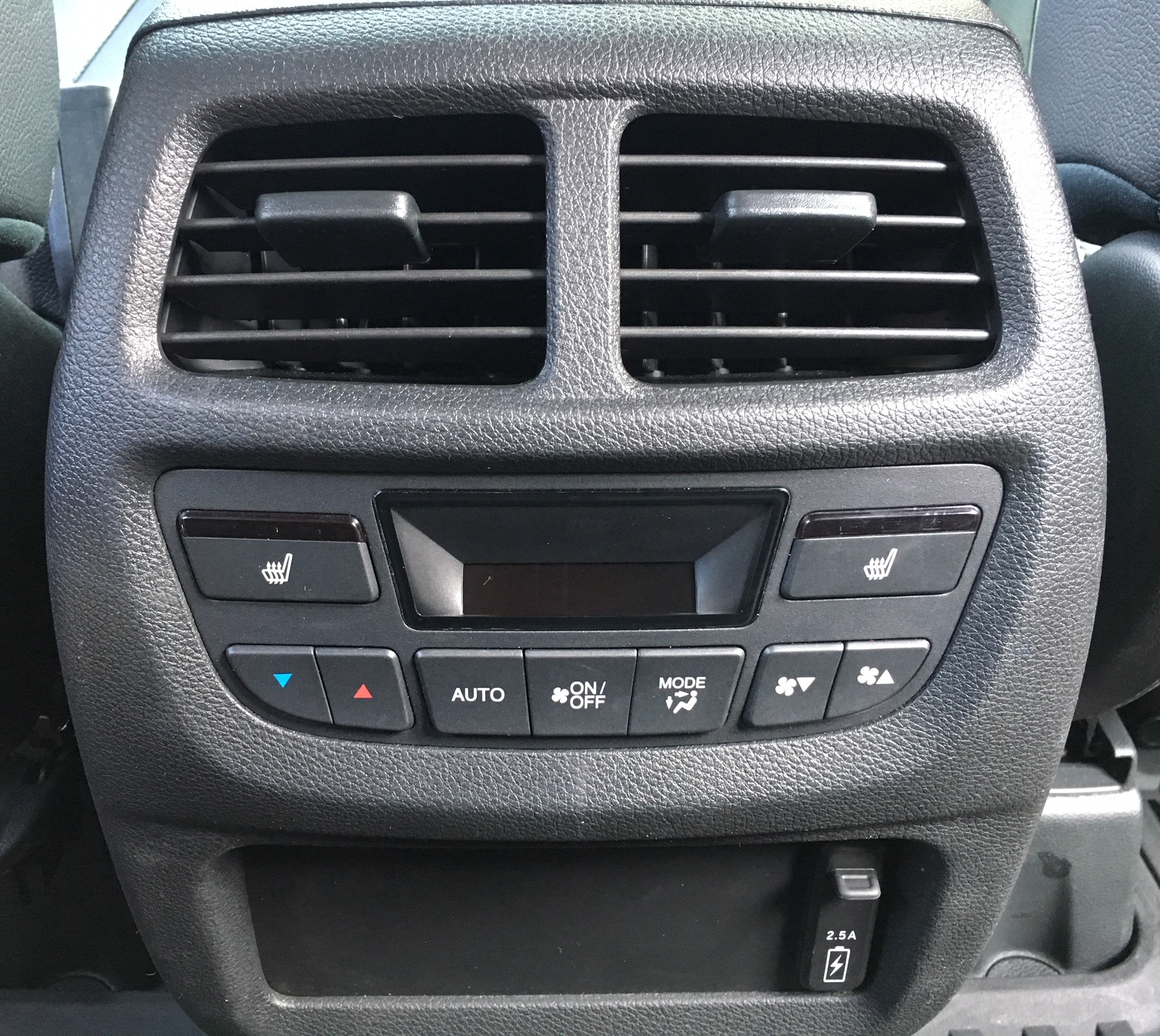
Second row rear-seat heaters and climate controls, exclusive to select Canadian models only

For the Canadian market, the second generation Ridgeline was initially offered in five trim levels: LX, Sport, EX-L, Touring, and Black Edition. Unlike the first generation Ridgelines sold in Canada, the second generation's trim packages are different from those sold in the US. For example, all second-generation Canadian Ridgeline comes standard with AWD, Honda Sensing, and the Clarion audio system with 8 in (20.3 cm) infotainment touchscreen. Additionally, there are unique amenities in the second-generation Ridgeline that can only be found in Canadian models.

For the Caribbean and Latin American markets, the 2017 Ridgeline is being offered in RTL and RTL-T trims, but are equipped differently than the US versions of the same name. In short, the Caribbean and Latin American RTL adds a number of features to what you would normally find in a US RTL. However, the Caribbean and Latin American RTL lacks the heated front seats of the US RTL trim. The Caribbean and Latin American RTL-T trim takes their RTL and adds navigation and voice recognition. Within each Latin American country, the second generation Ridgeline is sold a little differently, some will offer the RTL and RTL-T while others may only offer one.

Depending on trim level and country, the second generation Ridgeline is offered in four to seven different exterior colors (black, blue, red, green, two shades of gray, and white) to three interior colors (black, gray, and beige) in fabric (US and Canada) or leather (all countries) upholstery. Also, US and Canadian buyers can get a special black leather interior with red highlights that is exclusive to their Black Edition trim. As with the first generation Ridgeline, interior colors were mated to specific exterior colors and trims packages.

== Updates ==
In 2017, for the 2018 model year, the Ridgeline had some minor repackaging of its trim levels. For the US market, Honda removed the AWD option from the base RT trim, removed the RTS trim from the lineup, and expanded the Sport trim by adding two additional exterior colors (Lunar Silver Metallic and White Diamond Pearl) to what was an all-black Ridgeline. This left the RT trim with the Modern Steel Metallic exterior color as the only option remaining in the lineup with two-tone (black and gray) upholstery. The Canadian market saw the removal of their green exterior color (Forest Mist Metallic) and beige interior color from its 2018 lineup.

In 2019, for the 2019 model year, the US version of the Ridgeline received a 2.5 A USB charging port to the bottom three trim levels—increasing the total number to two—and the two middle trims (RTL and RTL-T) received the power moonroof and power sliding rear window that used to be exclusive to the top two trims. The Canadian market saw the removal of the Ridgeline's base LX trim from their 2019 lineup, giving them four trim levels to choose from.

In 2019, for the 2020 model year, the transmission was replaced with a ZF 9HP nine-speed automatic. Inside the cabin, the traditional gear shifter was changed to a push button style selector. The rear door checks have been extended, improving entry to the second row. Also the Honda Sensing suite, 8 in (20 cm) audio touchscreen, and power locking tailgate were made standard equipment on all models. For the US market, the RT, RTS, and RTL-T trim levels were removed, leaving four trim levels to choose from.

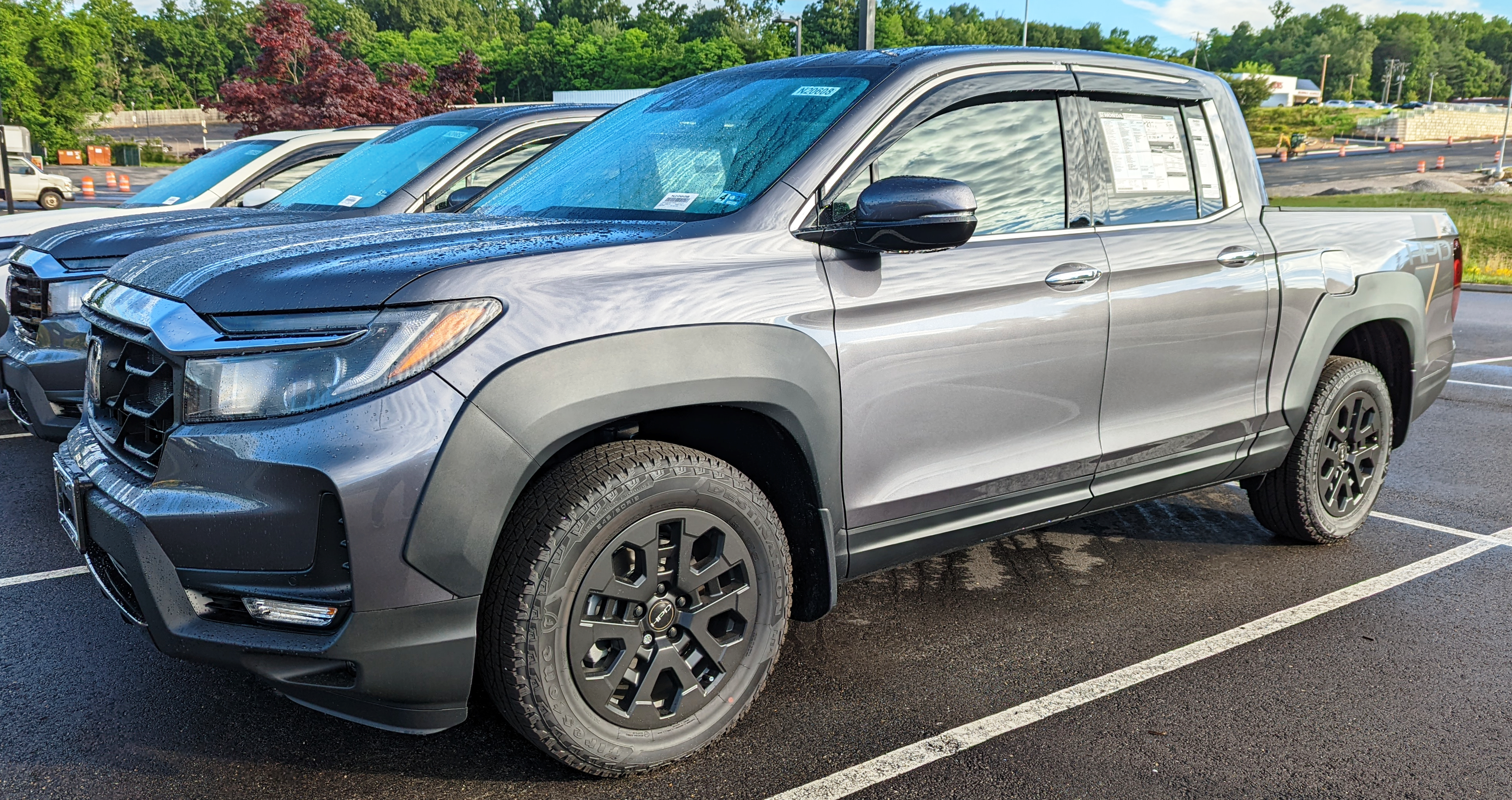
2022 Ridgeline RTL-E with HPD package and door visors

In 2021, for the 2021 model year, a new front facia was introduced with a squared-off nose and upright grille, a new skid plate, new front fenders with side vents that move air around the front wheels, brighter LED headlights, new rear bumper with dual engine exhaust tips, an increased track width, a volume knob for the 8 in (20 cm) audio touchscreen, wireless phone charging, updated upholstery, a new Honda Performance Development (HPD) package—with unique grille, fender flares, bronze-colored rims, and graphics—and a new Radiant Red Metallic exterior paint option was added. All the front-wheel drive trims are discontinued making the Ridgeline standard with all wheel drive.

In 2021, for the 2022 model year, the only change was the addition of a Sonic Gray Pearl paint option to the exterior color palette.

In 2023, for the 2024 model year, it has gained an all-new TrailSport trim that replaces RTL-E trim in the lineup. The TrailSport includes all-terrain tires, underbody protection, and diffused sky blue paint first appeared in Honda Pilot TrailSport. Also for 2024 model year, all trims comes standard with 7-inch digital instrument cluster, 9-inch color touchscreen with wireless Apple CarPlay and Android Auto compatibility, a new center console with a large integrated armrest and expanded storage. The Ridgeline nameplate is also stamped on the tailgate for all trims. For Sport, RTL, and Black Edition trims, it also has slightly new front fascia on the grille.

In 2025, for the 2026 model year, changes included a $450 price increase on all trim levels, Ash Green Pearl paint, and the choice of either a contrasting black or body colored roof for the Black Edition trims finished in either Sonic Gray Pearl or Platinum White Pearl.

== Comparisons ==
In late 2017, Car and Driver magazine conducted an in-depth review of the 2018 Ridgeline comparing it to the same model year Toyota Tacoma, Nissan Frontier, and GM's Colorado/Canyon. The numerical comparison revealed the Ridgeline had the best gasoline fuel economy, best cornering performance, best rear-seat passenger space and volume, lowest sound levels, best seat height, better visibility, and best in class safety features. For the "cons," the 2018 Ridgeline has the lowest tow rating, worst in class braking, lowest ground clearance, and the poorest rated infotainment system. The other criteria used by Car and Driver showed the truck falling in the middle of its competition giving the second generation Ridgeline Car and Driver's best mid-size pickup ranking for 2017.

IIHS safety ratings for the 2017 Honda Ridgeline
Categories	Ratings by trim level	
Categories	RT, RTS, Sport, RTL, and RTL-T	RTL-E and Black Edition
Headlights	Poor	Good
Front crash prevention (automated avoidance)	Not Available	Superior
Small overlap–driver	Good	
Small overlap–passenger	Acceptable	
Moderate overlap	Good	
Side	Good	
Roof strength	Good	
Head restraints and seats	Good	
LATCH (ease of use)	Acceptable	

After running through IIHS's new test procedures, the 2017 Ridgeline was given their new top honor, the Top Safety Pick-Plus. —As of September 2019, the 2017 Ridgeline remains the first and only Top Safety Pick-Plus mid-size pickup truck in IIHS's history.— Additionally, IIHS reported that the 2017 Ridgeline was the only pickup that received top marks at their new headlight performance test; however, these high marks only applied to the top trim levels of the Ridgeline that were equipped with LED projector headlights. Also, the National Highway Traffic Safety Administration (NHTSA) awarded the 2017–2019 Ridgelines its top mark, a five-star safety rating. NHTSA testing showed that the 2017–2019 Ridgelines have the best rollover resistance of any truck (full-size or mid-size) currently produced for the US market at 16.4% for FWD and 16.9% for AWD.

As in 2012, PickupTrucks.com performed another mid-size truck challenge but with 2016 and 2017 model year vehicles sold in the US. Through a battery of objective and subjective test—many similar and some different from the 2012 challenge—the 2017 Ridgeline came in second overall "by one of the slimmest margins in any test" PickupTrucks.com has conducted, winning half of the objective tests. PickupTrucks.com said, "There's no question the Ridgeline was the surprise of this challenge... Our biggest surprise came at our daylong romp at the Bundy Hill Offroad Park where we found the Honda Intelligent Traction Management system to be shrewd and smooth during our sand drags and steep hill climbs. However, as well as it performed, it still had a few problems;" such as how "much sag occurs while carrying payload," mushy and unpredictable brakes, and a hard to use with bad Sun glare infotainment touchscreen. "Still, if you need your pickup to be a Swiss Army knife and you don't need to carry a lot of gear, there isn't anything else in the Ridgeline's league."

== Marketing and sales ==
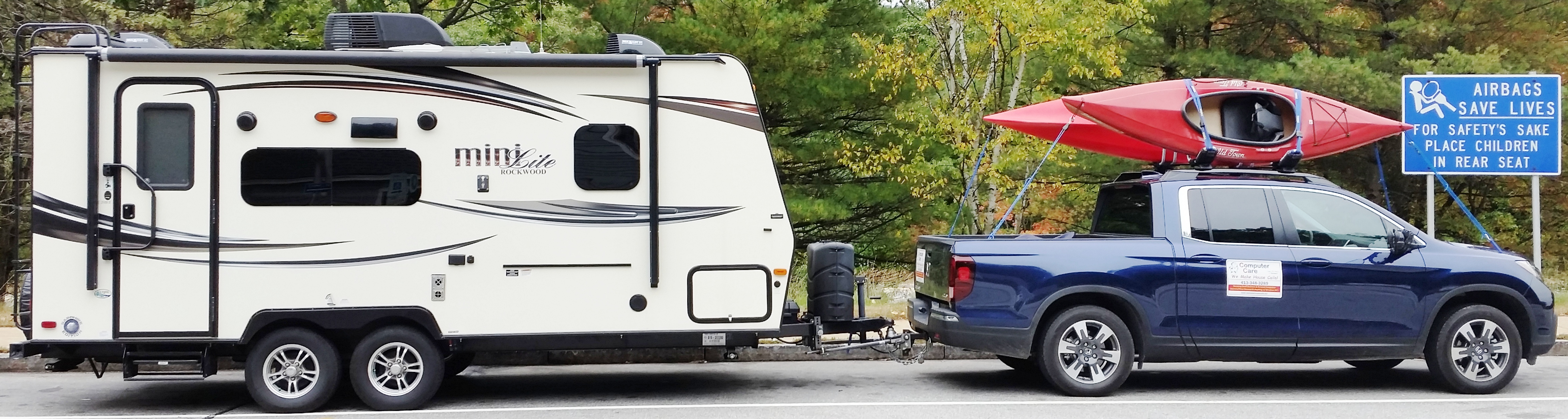
2017 Ridgeline RTL towing a Rockwood Mini Lite 2109S travel trailer

2018 Ridgeline RTL-E offroading on the Croom Loop Trails near Ridge Manor, Florida—with OEM accessory roof rack and running boards

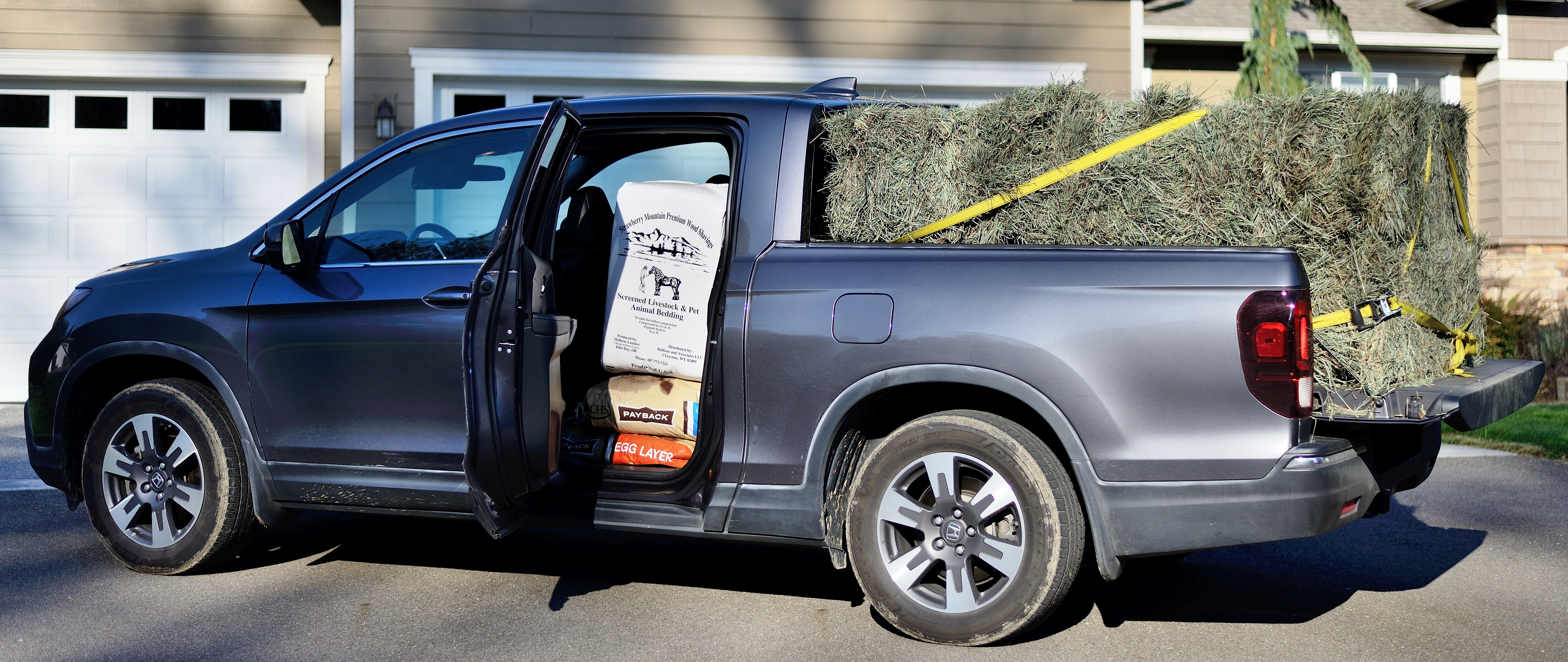
2017 Ridgeline RTL hauling hay and other goods from an animal feed store

Compared to the Gearheads.org wrote the "2017 Honda Ridgeline still won't get respect but should" stating, its "downside is going to be looks" with its "soft rounded pudgy panda look rather than a sharp chiseled warhorse." A New York Daily News reporter wrote, "You'd think that the most utilitarian of passenger vehicle styles—the pickup truck—would be a completely logical purchase. If that were the case, the Ridgeline would outsell all of the other midsize trucks by a landslide, boasting the best combination of safety, utility and drivability in the class. But the Toyota Tacoma and Chevrolet Colorado both have something that the Ridgeline almost completely lacks: ...bravado." Car and Driver wrote, "The company [Honda] readily admits that the problem with the first generation pickup was that the styling was off-putting, but then it went ahead and made the next iteration of the truck just as unconventional as before. It's a shame, because for all its minivan-with-a-bed looks, the Ridgeline is a comfortable, capable thing for people who don't regularly tow 10,000 pounds." "The Ridgeline's roomy cabin, ample storage, smooth ride, and innovative touches make its rivals seem outdated. ...it not only has cargo space, but also the makings of a great tailgate party..." with one of their editor's proclaiming, "What a great truck (and, yes, it's a truck, to all the haters out there). It's seriously practical without being unparkably huge." Autoblog published a short list of pros and cons after wrapping up their long-term road test of the second generation Ridgeline writing its size, the in–bed trunk, and its comfort were pros while the "OK" fuel economy, lack of paddle shifters, and a rear-door opening that was too small for comfortable ingress/egress were cons. Motor Trend magazine summed up their view by says they liked "its smooth ride and sharp handling," disliked "the high price, clumsy infotainment system, and plain design," and nominated the new Ridgeline as one of its finalist for their 2017 Truck of the Year competition.

With the introduction of the 2018 model year Ridgeline, media criticism of Honda's pricing for its Ridgeline expand. With the removal of the AWD option from the Ridgeline's base RT trim and the removal of the RTS trim, would-be US owners have to step up to the Sport trim to get an AWD equipped mid-size truck. According to Bloomberg Business and The Truth About Cars (TTAC), pricing was considered a problem with the first generation Ridgeline with TTAC writing, "It's not difficult to see that Honda is once again positioning the Ridgeline in what many conventional pickup truck buyers will consider an uncomfortable price bracket."

Examining the sales figures for the second generation Ridgeline, TorqueNews wrote, "...it looks as if American Honda Motors has yet another sales success in its ever expanding lineup." With Honda targeting sales of up to 40,000 Ridgelines per year, initial sales demand for the new Ridgeline outpaced production. To help address demand for its larger vehicles, Honda moved production of its Acura MDX to its East Liberty Auto Plant in order to increase production of the Odyssey, Pilot, and Ridgeline.

Second generation Honda Ridgeline sales and production
Calendar year	Sales		Production
Calendar year	USA	CAN	Production
2016	23,665	2,614	34,599
2017	34,749	4,632	39,282
2018	30,592	4,094	46,123
2019	33,334	3,405	29,246
2020	32,168	3,369	34,055
2021	41,355	3,491	41,822
2022	42,762	3,135	50,434
2023	52,001	3,114	54,934
2024	45,421	3,435	55,843
2025	48,448	3,314	50,221

Although Honda claims not to be in competition with other mid-size truck manufacturers, in 2017 the Toyota Tacoma outsold the Honda Ridgeline 5 : 1 despite the Ridgeline's slight edge in sales over the GMC Canyon that year. Yet, Kelley Blue Book has consistently ranked the second generation Ridgeline in its top ten best resale value vehicles in the US with the 2019 model year having an estimated resale value of 63.2% at 36 months and 51.3% at 60 months, just under their top ranked mid-size truck, the Toyota Tacoma. However, a 2018 Autoline Daily report stated the Ridgeline is the only mid-size truck in North America whose sales are down in a market that "suggests there's room for more players."

== Gallery ==
Second generation Honda Ridgeline
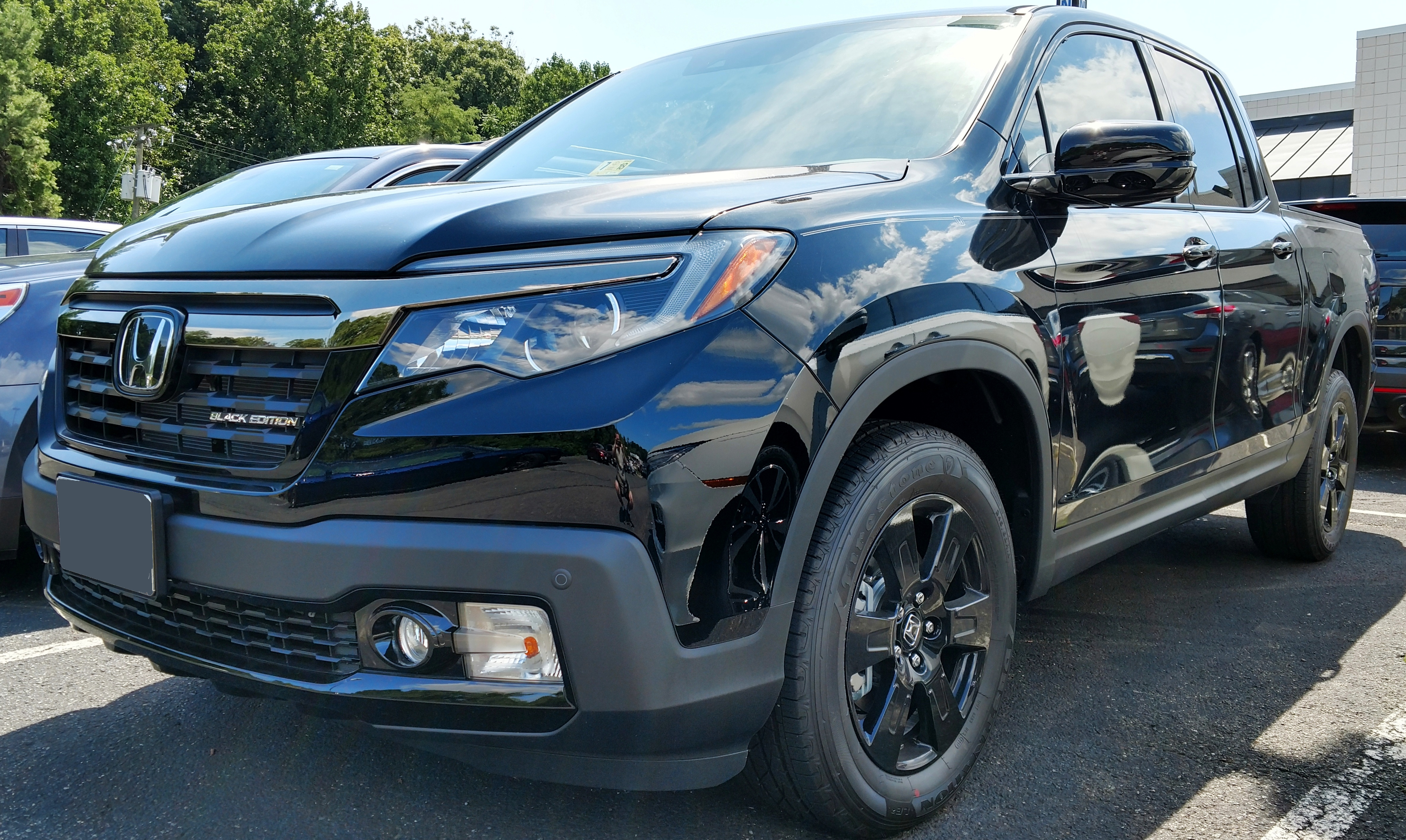
2018 Honda Ridgeline Black Edition

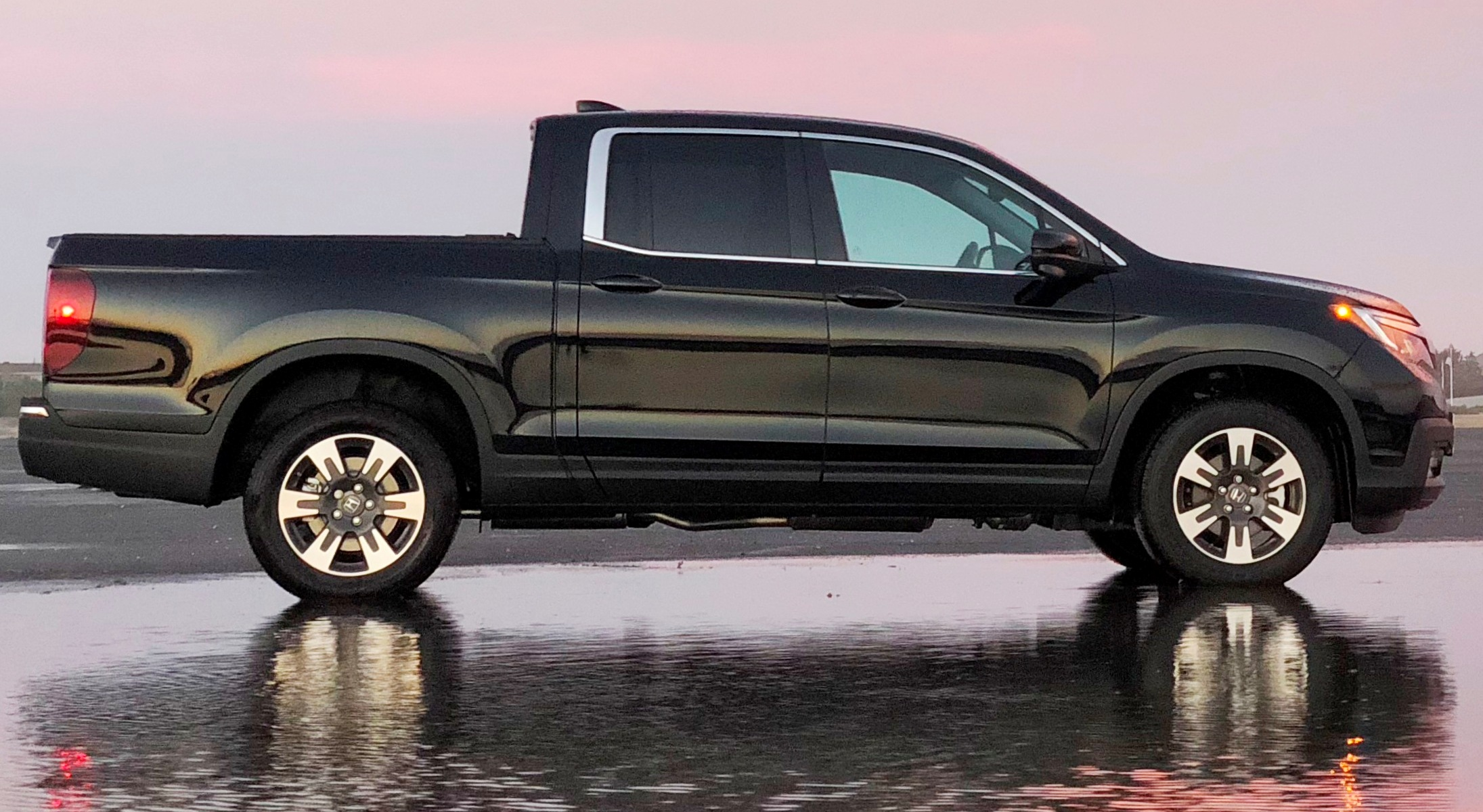
2018 Honda Ridgeline RTL-T

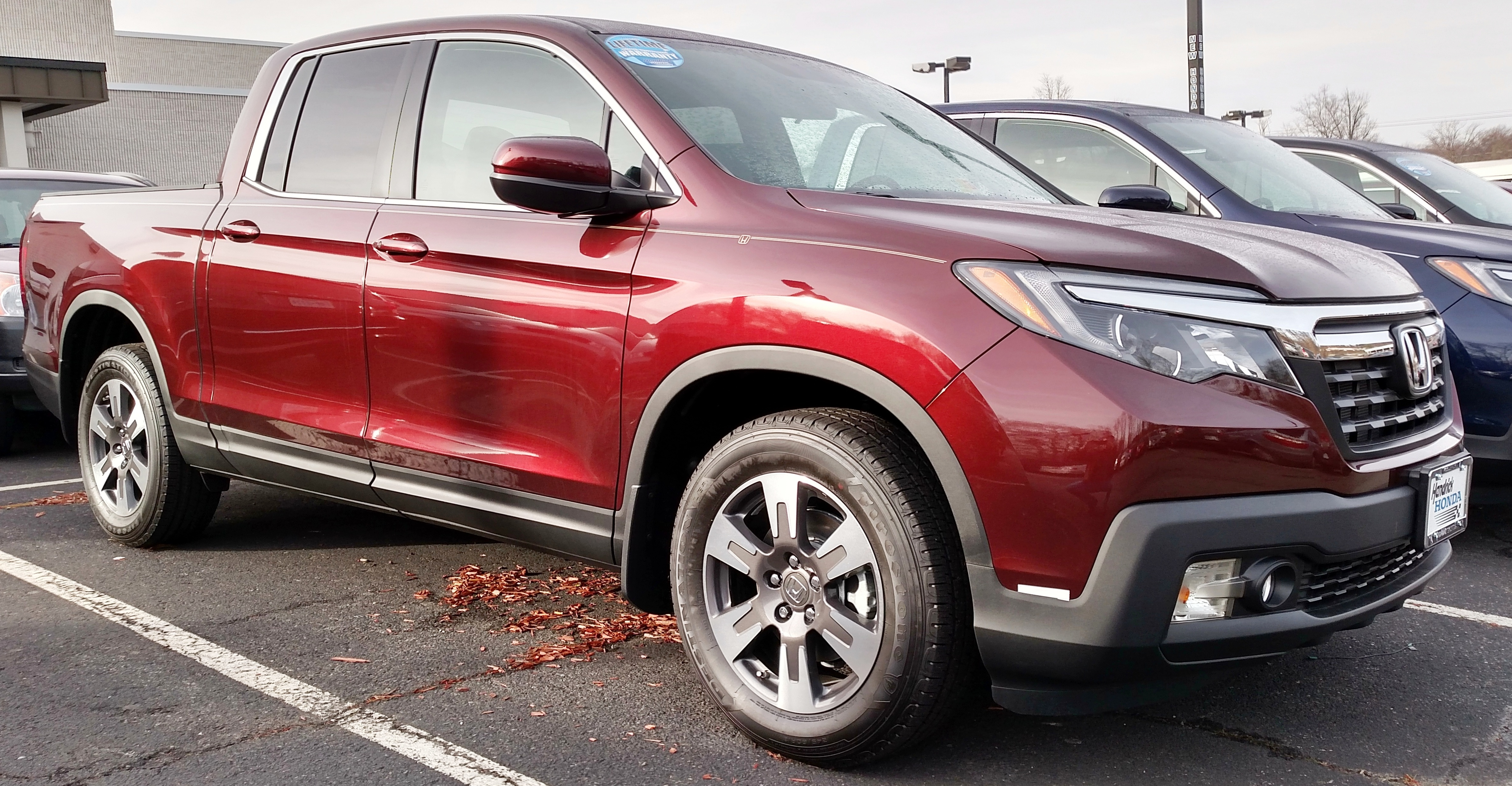
2017 Honda Ridgeline RTL (FWD)

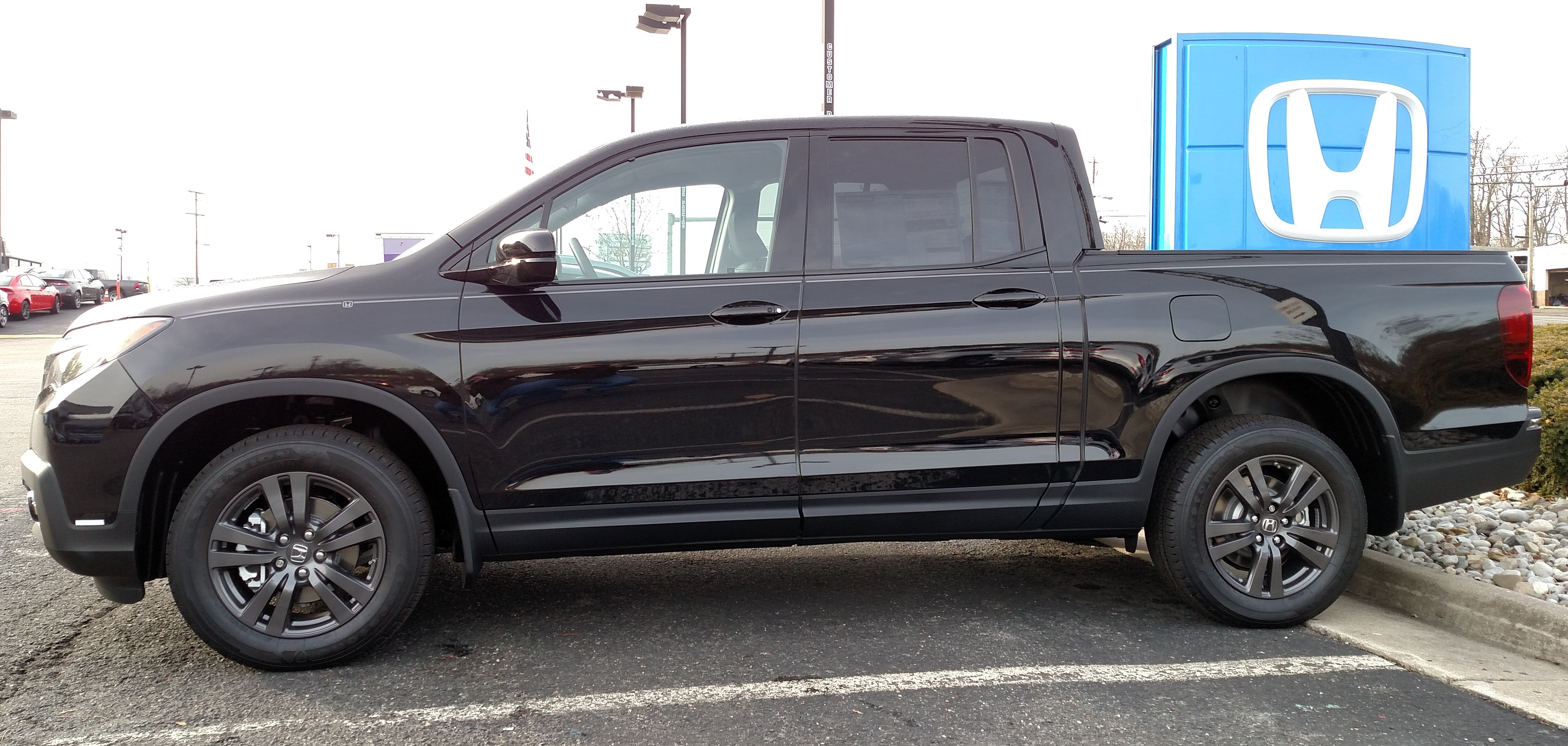
2017 Honda Ridgeline Sport

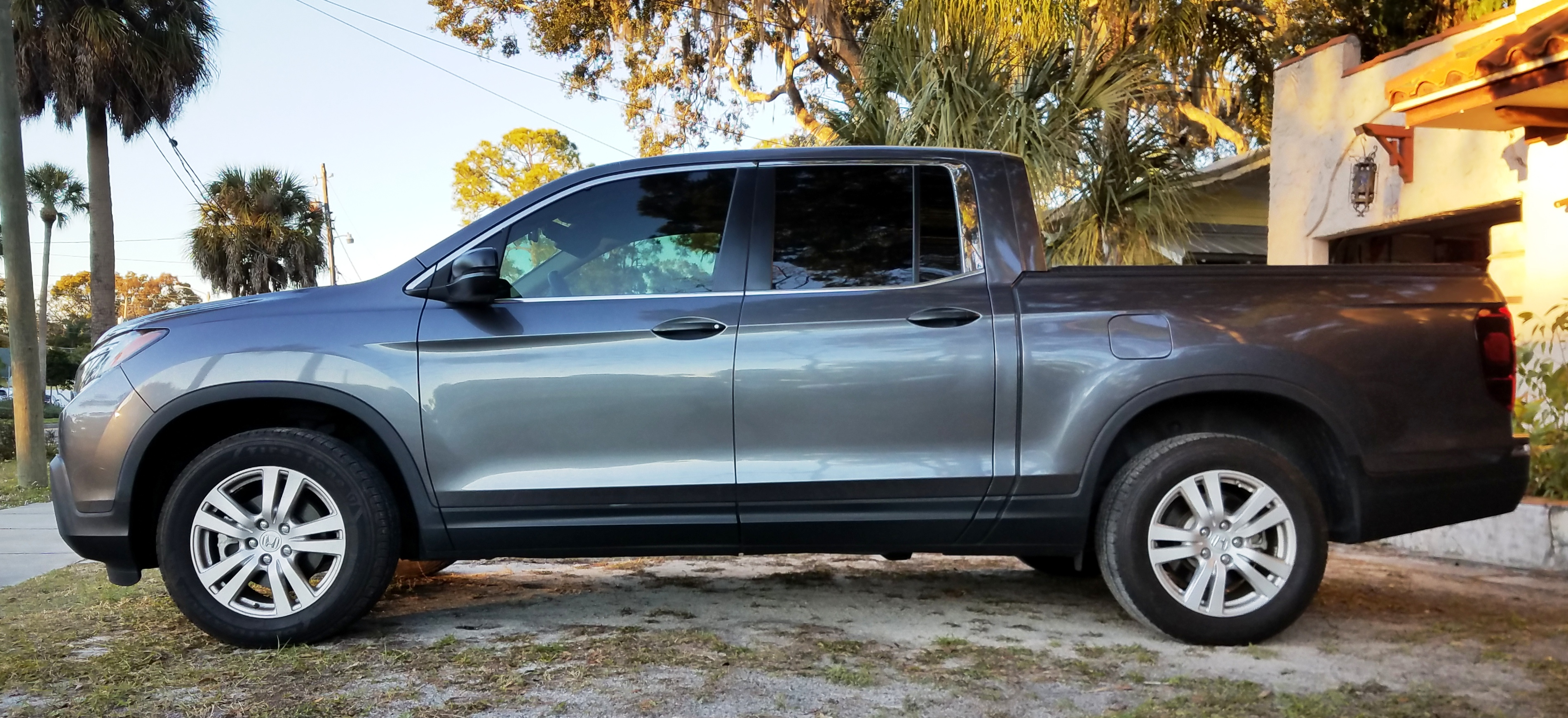
2017 Honda Ridgeline RT

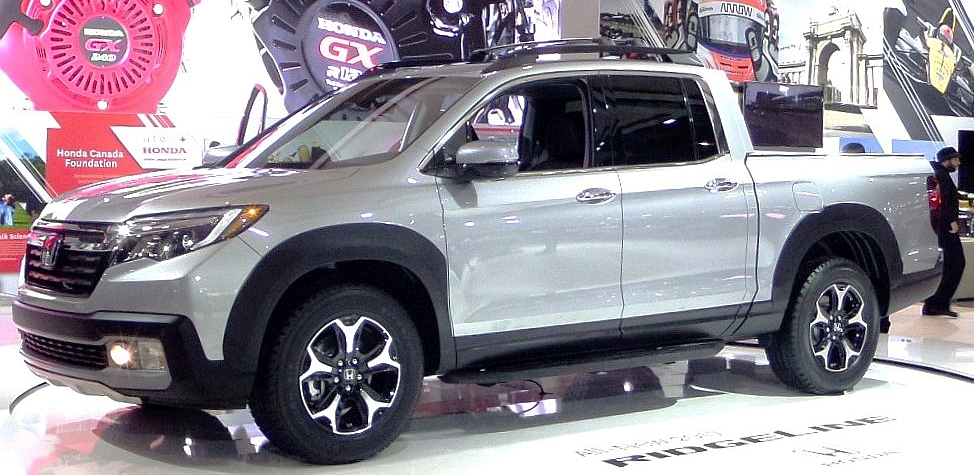
2017 Honda Ridgeline showing off exterior OEM accessories

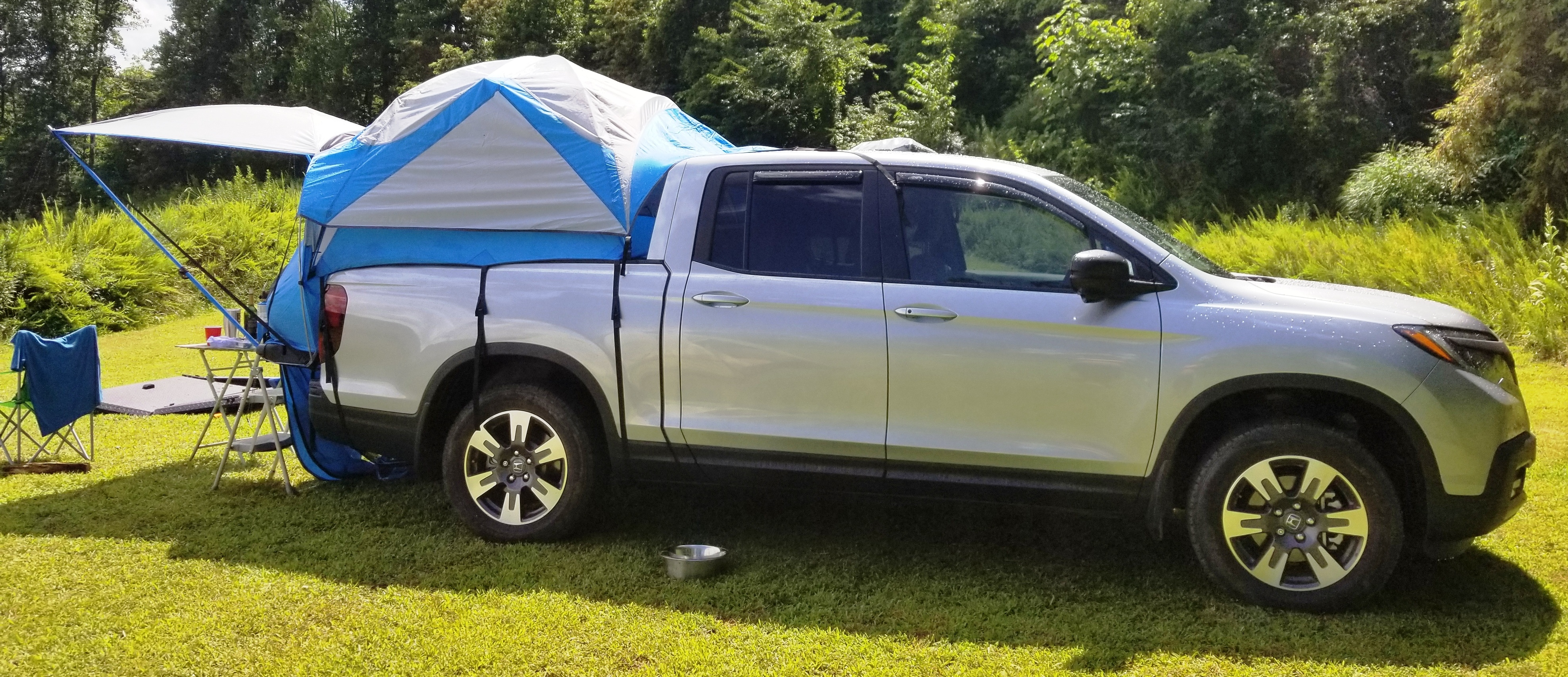
2017 Honda Ridgeline RTL-T (front-wheel drive) with Honda Bed Tent

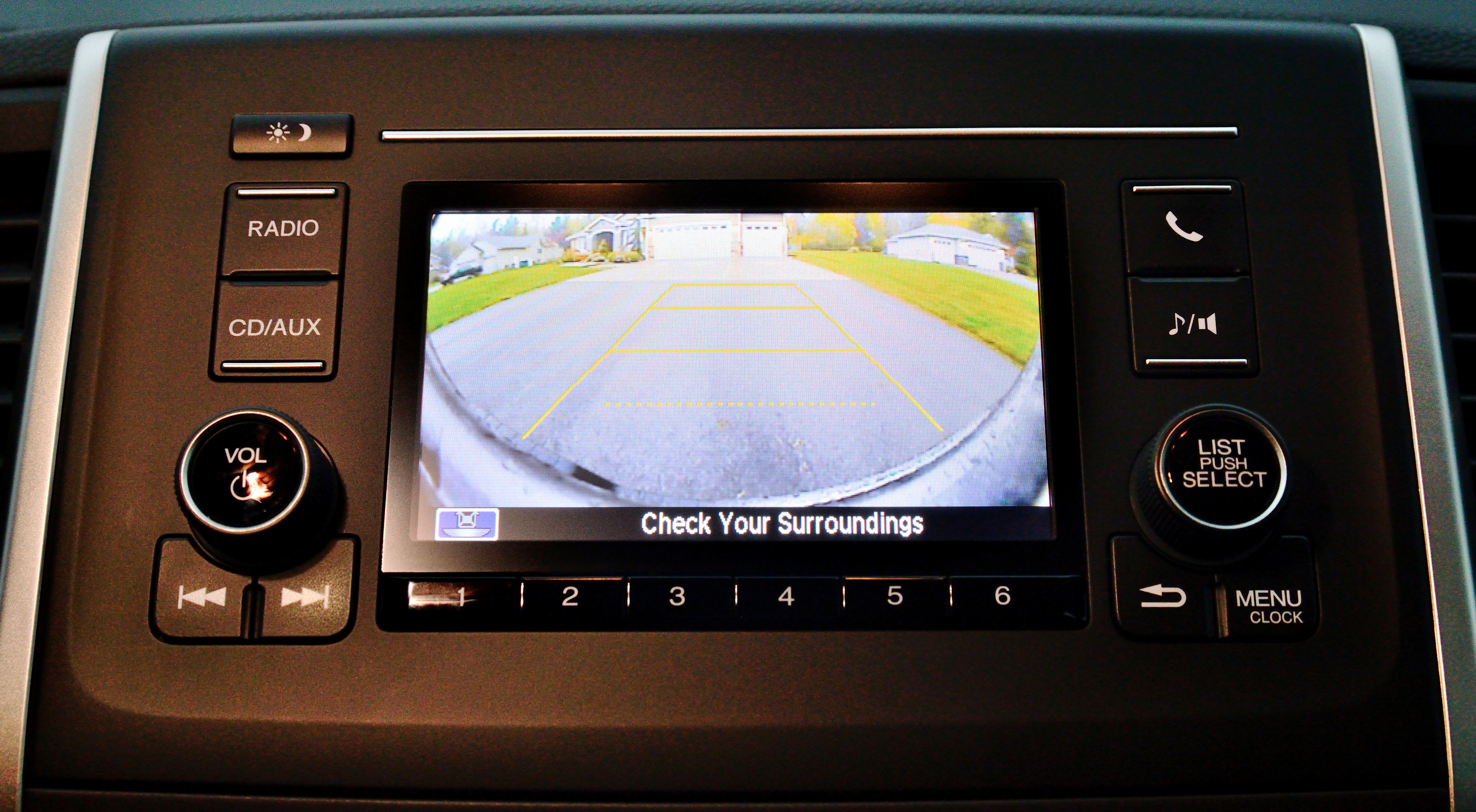
2017 Honda Ridgeline backup camera display in base radio unit

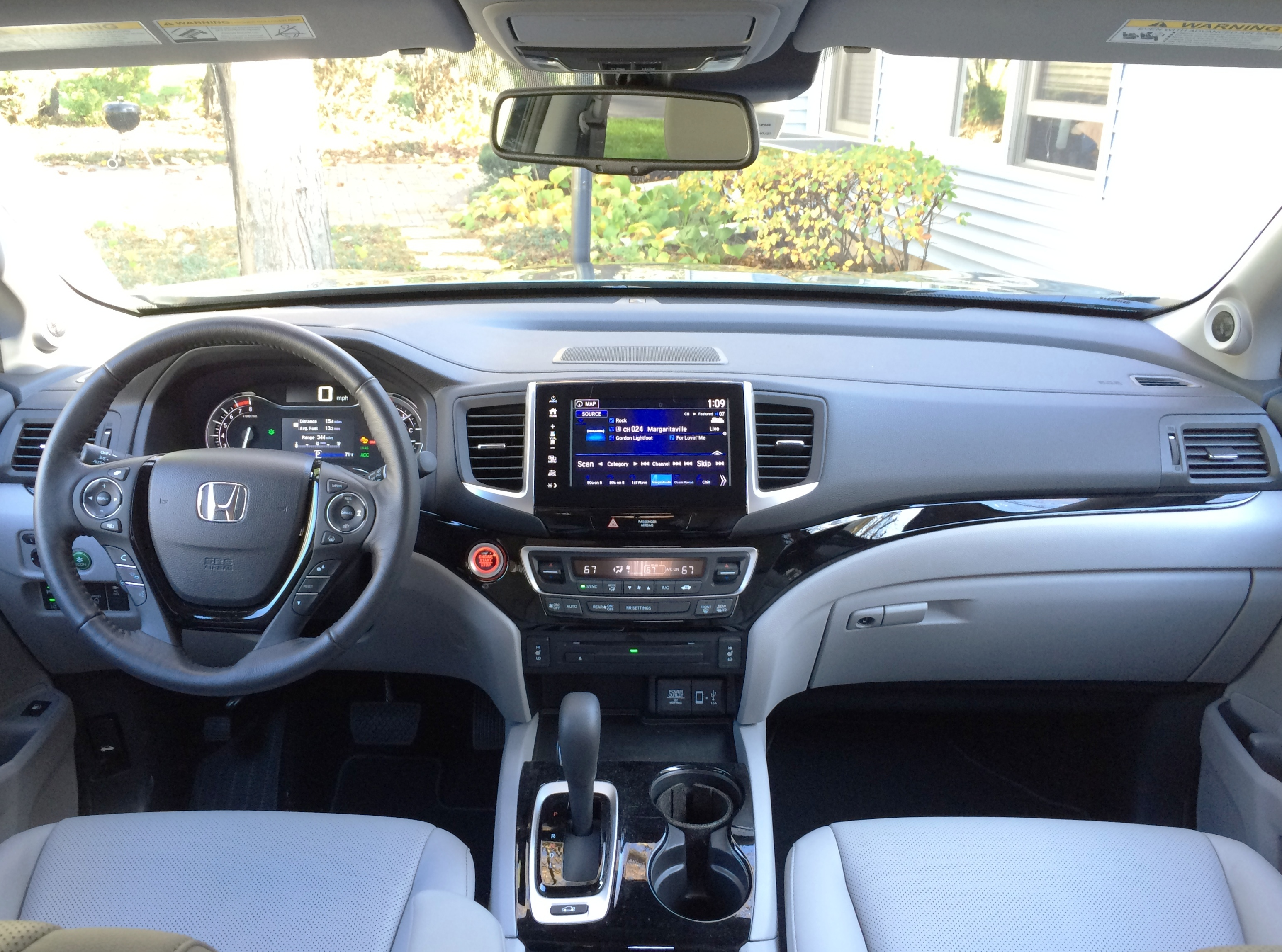
2017 Ridgeline RTL-E dashboard with OEM accessory CD player

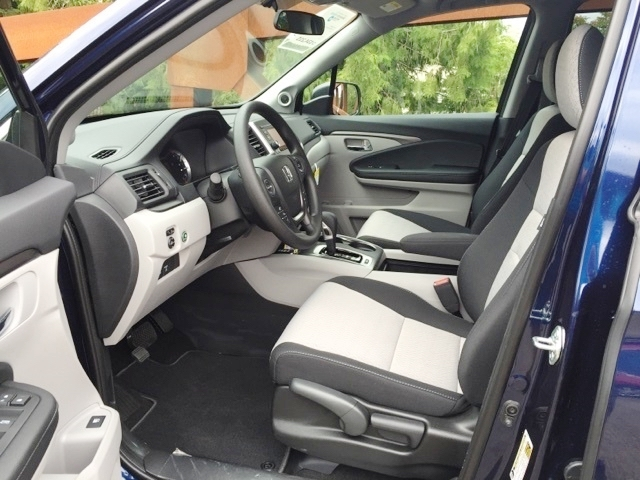
2017 Honda Ridgeline RTS two-tone fabric upholstery

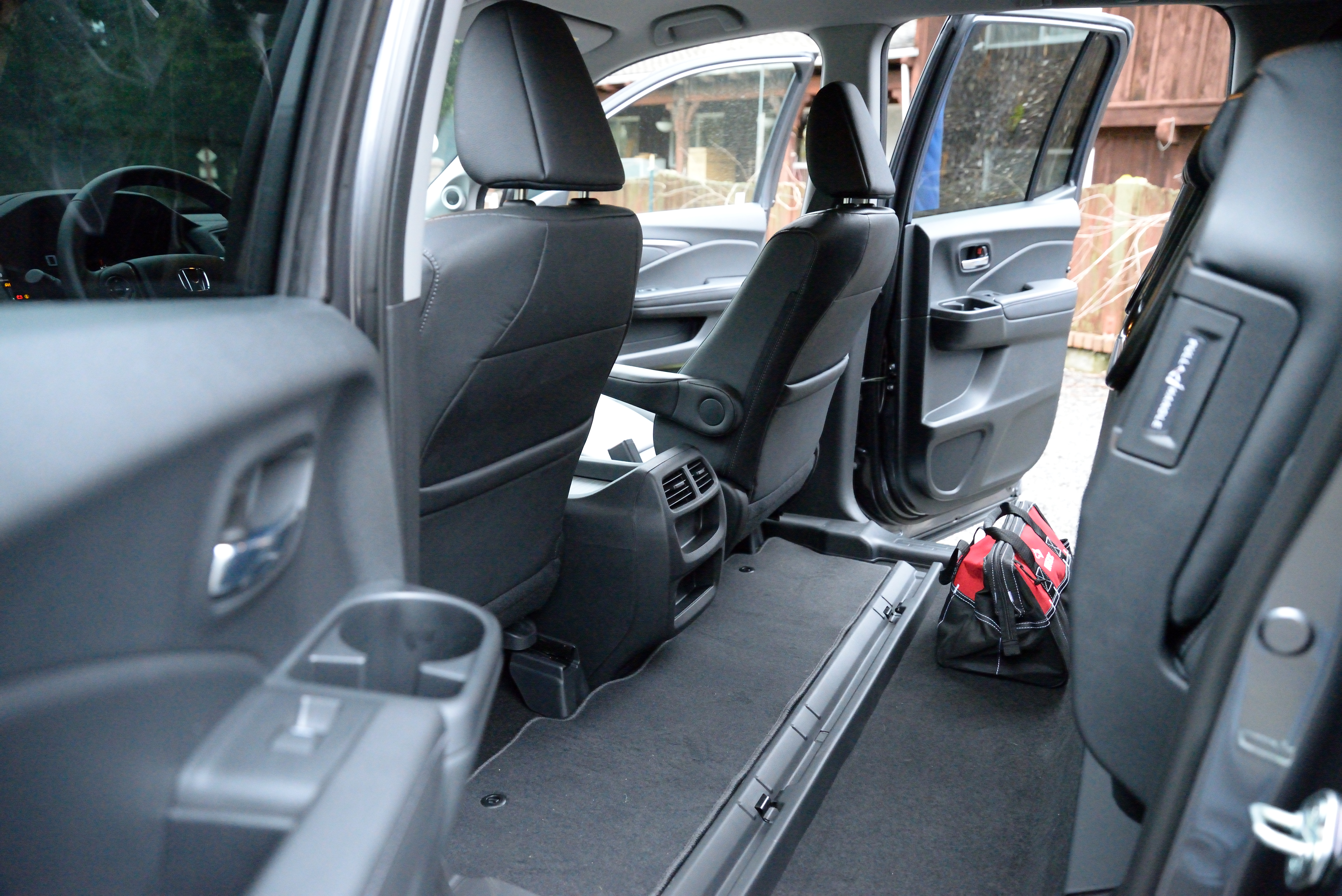
2017 Honda Ridgeline RTL second row flat load floor

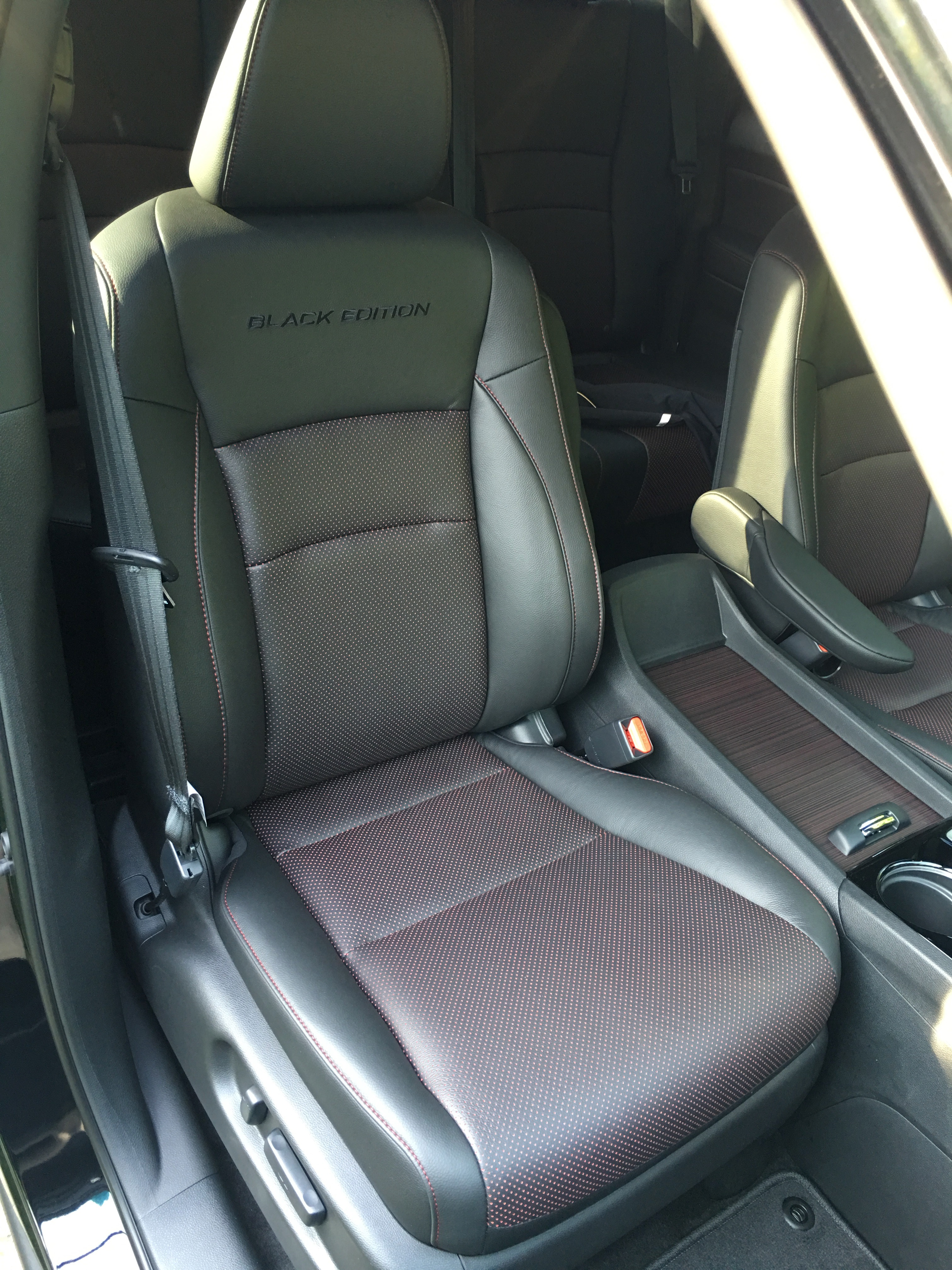
2017 Honda Ridgeline Black Edition upholstery

== Awards ==
- North American Car of the Year 2017.
- Car and Driver's #1 mid-size truck for 2017–2019
- Auto123.com's 2017 Pickup of the Year
- J.D. Power and Associates' Automotive Performance, Execution, and Layout (APEAL) Award for 2017 and 2018
- Green Car Journal's 2017 Green Truck of the Year
- Consumer Guide Automotive Best Buy Award for 2017–2019
- Kelley Blue Book's Top Ten Best Resale Value Award for 2017–2019
- The Car Connection's Best Pickup to Buy for 2018
- Women's Choice Awards in the Eco-Friendly and Safety categories for 2018
- IIHS's first pickup to earn "Top Safety Pick-Plus" award (2017) and the only pickup to earned "Top Safety Pick" for 2018 and 2019
- SCORE Baja off-road race winner in Class 7 in 2015, 2016, 2018, and 2019
- iSeeCars.com's longest-lasting truck most likely to reach 200,000 miles
