= Trailer stability assist =

Trailer stability assist (TSA), also known as electronic trailer sway control, is designed to control individual wheel slip to correct potential trailer swing before there is an accident. Although similar to electronic stability control (ESC), TSA is programmed differently and is designed to detect yaw in the tow-vehicle and take specific corrective actions to eliminate trailer sway. Most ESC systems are not designed to detect such movement nor take the correct actions to control both trailer and tow-vehicle; so not all ESC equipped vehicles have TSA capabilities.

TSA systems detect when a trailer is starting to oscillate while under tow and corrects any dangerous trailer swing through a combination of either torque reduction and/or individual wheel braking to bring the trailer and tow-vehicle back under control. While towing heavy trailers, such as a travel trailer, an unwanted wallow of the whole assembly may occur. Without the help of electronics, regaining stability requires focused attention by the driver.

== See also ==
- Autonomous cruise control system
- Lane departure warning system
- Collision avoidance system

== External references ==
- Driver Assistance System: Honda Sensing
