= Michelin PAX System =

Run-flat tire system for automobiles

Logo

PAX is an automobile run-flat tire system developed and manufactured by Michelin since the 2000s. It utilizes a special type of rim and tire to allow temporary use of a wheel if its tire is punctured. The core of Michelin's PAX system is the semi-rigid ring installed onto the rim using special equipment. It provided support to the tire and its sidewall to allow emergency operation at limited speed until such time as the tire can be replaced.

Cars that used the system include supercars like the Bugatti Veyron EB 16.4, luxury cars like the Rolls-Royce Phantom, and more common vehicles like the Honda Odyssey and Nissan Quest.

== History ==
=== Prior developments ===
Prior to the introduction of PAX, Michelin and Goodyear produced other pneumatic tires that could temporarily support themselves without air pressure. These tires were modified with a stiffer, heavier sidewall which could support the weight of a vehicle at speed without losing control. This design allowed a vehicle to be driven at a limited speed to a service station.

The heavier sidewalls and special bead construction allowed a driver to drive a car with little or no air pressure at a limited speed (approximately 50 mph) over some specified distance to a service station, or at least off the roadway out of immediate danger. In a conventional pneumatic tire, loss of pressure at speed would result in the collapse of the soft tire sidewalls such that the metal wheel edges would slice through the collapsed sidewalls, which would likely result in an accident, possibly fatal, as well as the destruction of the tire, and possibly the wheel. These tires required the introduction of an electronic tire pressure monitoring system to indicate low tire pressure to a driver. With conventional tires, low pressure is obvious, due to sidewall deformation; but with reinforced sidewall run-flat tires, low pressure is difficult to detect until the tire fails.

The Goodyear EMT (Extended Mobility Tire), with a reduced sidewall, was introduced with the 1994 Chevrolet Corvette. Michelin also introduced a similar tire in the mid-1990s called the Zero Pressure System, distinguished from conventional tires by the designator "ZP."

=== Development and release ===
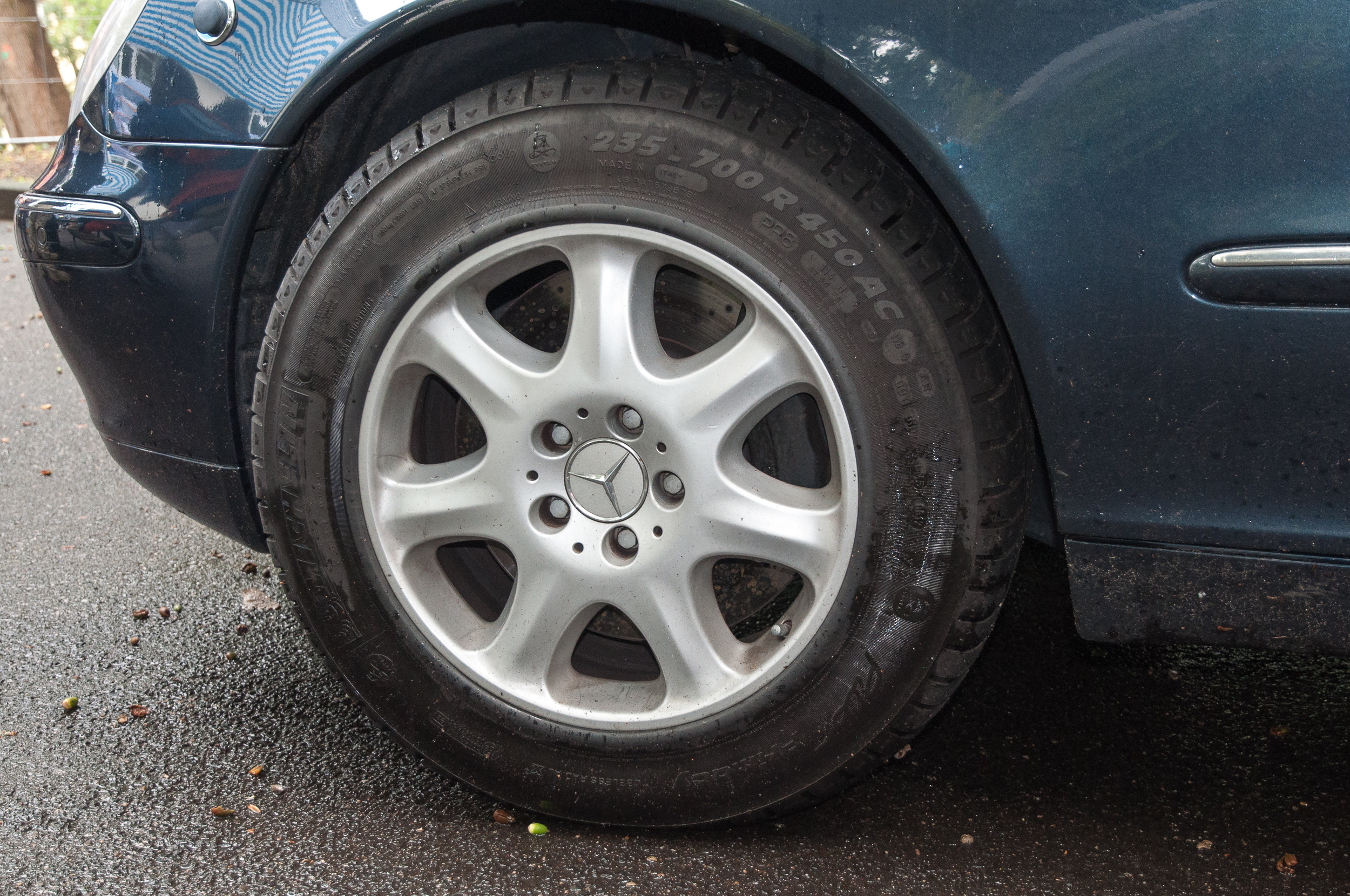
Michelin PAX run-flat wheel on a Mercedes-Benz S-Class

Michelin began developing the PAX concept under the name "pneu accrochage vertical" (PAV) in the late 1990s. It was exhibited at trade shows in 1997 and 1998, and introduced as PAX in November 2000. PAX differed from previous run-flat tires in that it was not a modified conventional tire, but rather a system consisting of a specially designed wheel, a unique supportive insert, and a specially tailored tire.

PAX was introduced in Europe on the 2002 Renault Scenic, and made its U.S. debut on the 2004 Rolls-Royce Phantom.

=== Discontinuation ===
In December 2007, Michelin announced that they would cease development of PAX, citing lower-than-expected demand for the product, but would continue to produce PAX wheels and tires for existing vehicles. By April 2008, Michelin announced that they would discontinue production of PAX wheels and tires for regular passenger automobiles.

=== Lawsuit ===
In March 2007, a federal class-action lawsuit against Michelin and American Honda Motor Company was filed by owners of PAX-equipped Honda Odyssey and Acura RL vehicles. The suit, including consumers from Arizona, Florida, Illinois, and New York, alleged that PAX tires had a significantly shorter lifespan than conventional tires, were vulnerable to increased wear and side punctures, could only be serviced by a limited number of facilities, and were prohibitively expensive to replace; and that the two companies misrepresented the cost and convenience of repairs and replacements to customers. It was consolidated with three similar lawsuits in March 2008, and two other lawsuits against the companies were dismissed.

A settlement was reached in December 2008. The settlement stated that the PAX tire system should continue to be used with cars originally equipped with PAX system. The original warranty was extended to 36,000 miles, although it is unclear as to whether it is the materials and workmanship portion of the warranty or the hazard insurance portion of the warranty, or both. Also left unanswered was what happens to the trip interruption payments, and the guarantee to get a replacement tire delivered within one day if the car is stranded beyond the 125-mile flat tire driving limit since PAX-certified repair shops are not as plentiful as standard tire repair shops. In addition, a spare tire kit would be offered by Honda for those cars originally equipped with the PAX system tires since servicing may be impractical in certain geographic areas. If a spare had already been purchased, Honda would reimburse the owner approximately $110.00. The deadline for class claims was in January 2010. Affected owners were referred to the sfmslaw.com web site, the attorneys responsible for the class action suit.

On December 20, 2010, the United States District Court for the District of Maryland granted final approval of the consumer class action.

=== Current commercialisation ===
The PAX wheel-tire system is still sold by Michelin and has been used on armoured cars after its discontinuation for regular passenger vehicles, as it offers extended run-flat capabilities. Notable armoured models equipped with the PAX system include the BMW 7 Series Protection (G70), Mercedes-Benz S-Class Guard (W222 and W223), and Audi A8 Security (D4).

== Technical details ==
The PAX system approached the problem differently, requiring a system of parts, not just a different tire. Rather than extra stiff and supportive sidewalls, the PAX system relies on a newly designed asymmetric wheel, a supportive insert and a similarly asymmetric tire combination to provide an extended run-flat capability of up to 125 miles at 50 or 55 mph.

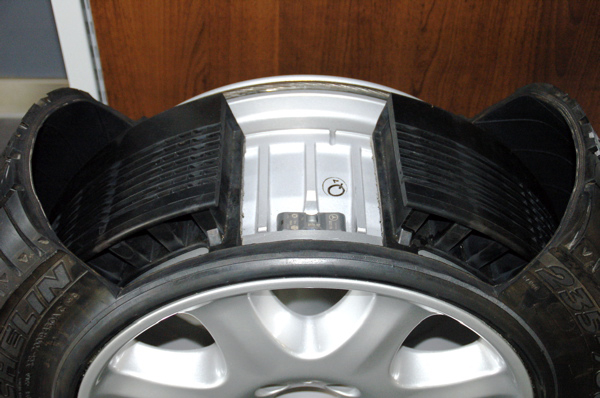
Inside of a PAX tire

The PAX system weighed approximately the same as four conventional tires plus a spare. So although comparable PAX tires were heavier than conventional counterparts, they were not that much heavier (Michelin claims four PAX System assemblies are equal to the weight of 4.7 standard tire-wheel assemblies). However, rotating mass and unsprung weight of the wheels and tires on the ground increased, which is a disadvantage. In addition, no spare tire had to be carried, so that PAX-equipped vehicles weighed no more than conventionally equipped vehicles, and had more storage space without the spare tire. Michelin said that the retail replacement cost of the PAX tires would be approximately equal to the cost of five conventional tires. The true cost was approximately US$1200 or $1600 for snow tires in 2008 for Odyssey which is higher than some conventional tires. PAX tires allegedly had a smoother ride and provided better gas mileage than the comparable conventional tire but owner impressions vary greatly. PAX tires provided peace of mind and real safety and added mobility that no conventional tire could but limited availability and cost of PAX tires and service reduced owner satisfaction. As with the zero-pressure type run flats, a tire pressure monitoring system (TPMS) was mandatory. TPMS became mandatory on all cars soon afterward.

The soft PAX sidewall allows for a more comfortable ride compared to run flat tires which work by having stiff sidewalls. When flat, the PAX tire sidewalls collapse until the weight of the car is riding on an internal polymer support ring mounted to an asymmetric wheel. That is the outside diameter of the wheel is smaller than the inside diameter of the wheel. This asymmetric wheel and tire design allows the tire to lock onto the wheel, rather than coming off at speed and/or while turning. So a PAX wheel that appears to be about 18 inches from the outside of the car (the side facing out), will look more like 19 inches on the inside of the wheel (the side facing the suspension). The inner support ring is also coated with a gel that is required to lubricate the rotating flat PAX tire.

A PAX tire may be patched from the inside as a conventional tire. If the tire is replaced, and the inner support ring is undamaged, the inner support ring need not be replaced. A new gel pack is generally applied when the tires are demounted and repaired or replaced.

PAX tires are measured in the metric system exclusively unlike the mixed English and metric measurements prevalent in conventional tires. For example a conventional passenger car tire might have the designation 245/45-18, indicating a tread section 245 mm wide, with an aspect ratio of 45% (i.e., the sidewall height is 45% the width of the tread section), mounted on an 18 inch conventional wheel. The similarly sized PAX tire was designated 245-680R460A, indicating the same 245 mm tread section, but a 680 mm overall diameter (a specification not in the conventional passenger car tire nomenclature), the R, meaning radial construction, a 460 mm wheel seat diameter (approximately 18.1 inches) and A for asymmetric, meaning that the wheel is asymmetric, or PAX system.

Special machinery and training is required to service the PAX tires. Michelin was confident enough in its service network that it guaranteed a replacement within 12 hours, if the Michelin dealer could not repair the original tire, or did not stock the replacement. Michelin also worked with Honda (for the Odyssey minivan) and Acura (for the RL luxury sedan) to ensure each dealer carried a full set of replacements wheel tire combinations in inventory. However, Canadian models of Odyssey did not offer PAX tires.

In theory, the PAX tire would not have the same proprietary issues that plagued the Michelin TRX tire that was introduced in the mid-1970s but died out in the 1980s. By licensing the PAX technology to other companies, Michelin would ensure that the consumer would not be locked into a single supplier as with the TRX. Pirelli, Goodyear, Toyo and Sumitomo have licensed the technology from Michelin, but these companies never came out with PAX system tires. So in reality, the consumer was still left with a single supplier solution.

== Vehicles equipped ==
=== United States ===
- 2004–2008 Rolls-Royce Phantom
- 2004–2011 Bugatti Veyron
- 2005–2009 Honda Odyssey Touring
- 2006–2008 Acura RL
- 2006–2007 Nissan Quest

=== Europe ===
- Bugatti Veyron EB 16.4
- Renault Scenic models in Europe—introduced in February 2002
- Audi A8 in Europe—introduced in November 2002
- Rolls-Royce Phantom—introduced in January 2003
- Audi A4 in Europe—introduced in September 2004
- Mercedes-Benz S-Class
- BMW 7-Series (G70)
- Lancia Thesis Blindata B6
