= Informed for LIFE =

Informed for LIFE is a Connecticut non-profit organization that provides "a free, public service to guide consumers on the use of vehicle crash test and fatality data".

Informed For Life's website was launched in 2003 by Michael D. Dulberger, a retired aerospace engineer, to help consumers identify the safest vehicles to avoid unnecessary loss of life. Informed for LIFE aggregates car safety data from the National Highway Traffic Safety Administration (NHTSA) and the Insurance Institute for Highway Safety (IIHS), plus vehicle weight, into a risk index "SCORE (Statistical Combination Of Risk Elements)" that claims to demonstrate "superior correlation with actual driver fatalities than any other safety evaluation method". In September, 2012 the methodology was updated to factor in the latest testing categories by both NHTSA and IIHS. This revised methodology collates and codifies all of the NHTSA and IIHS ratings to identify the safest 10% of vehicles based on the following criteria:

1. Rated "Top Pick" by IIHS and "5-Star Overall" by NHTSA. The testing protocols used by these agencies complement each other and they must both agree the vehicle has superior crashworthiness.
2. Each individual rating must be in the top quartile for frontal impact, side impact, rear impact and rollover. This filters out vehicles with individual crash modes that have above average risk.
3. Size/weight-based projected fatality rates must be less than that of the average weight passenger car. This filters out vehicles with higher than average vehicle incompatibility risk, measured as Driver Fatality Factor > 1.0.

In their July 2013 issue, Motor Trend announced their plan to utilize Informed For Life's safety analysis as part of their vehicle assessment program.

In June 2006, Forbes Autos used car safety data from Informed for LIFE to produce a listing of the top 10 safest vehicles.
