= Honda Accord =

Japanese mid-size car

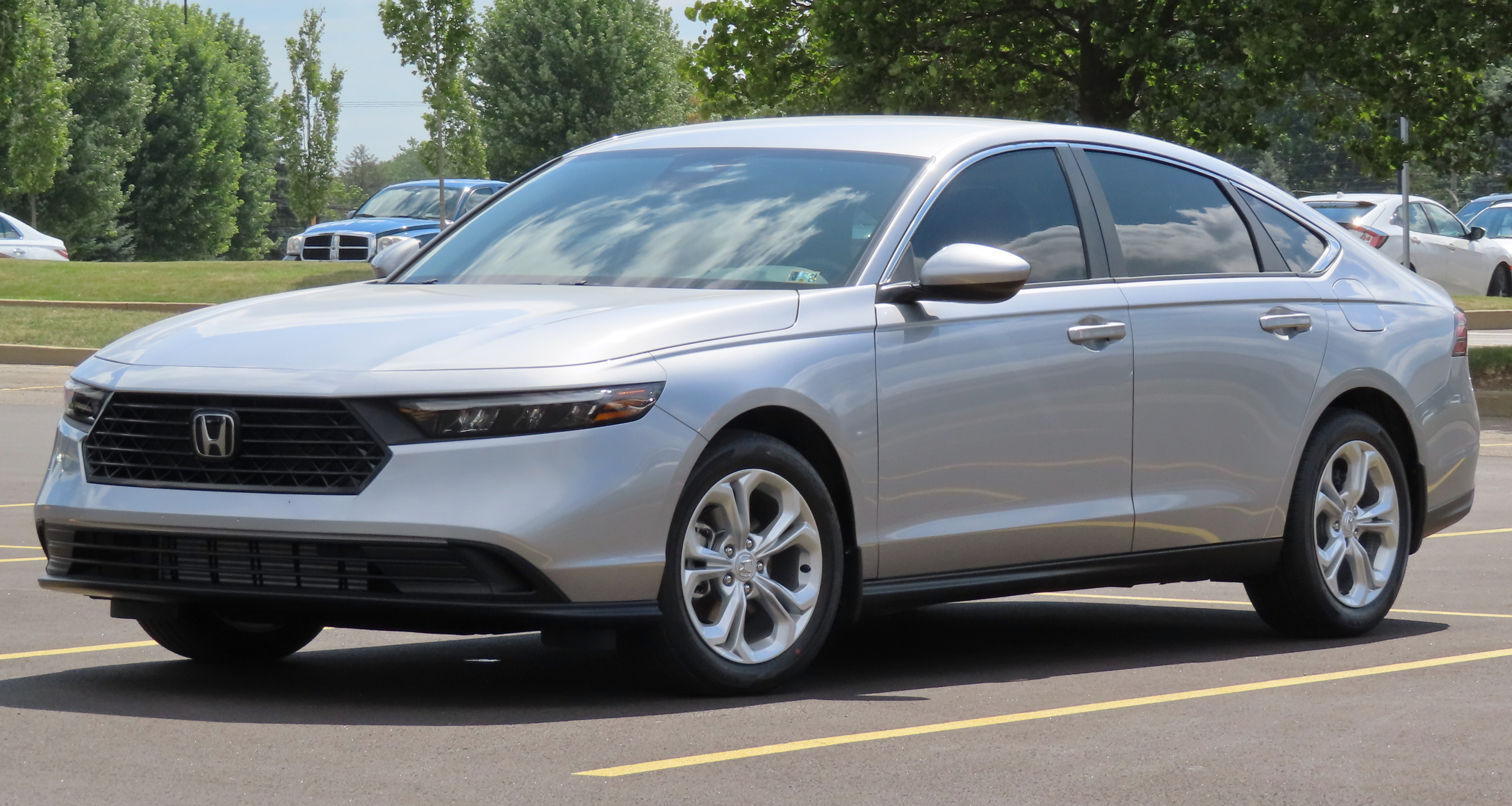
- 2023 Honda Accord LX (US)

Overview
- Manufacturer: Honda
- Production: 1976–present

Body and chassis
- Class: Compact car (1976–1989); Mid-size car (1989–present)
- Body style: 3-door hatchback (1976–1989); 4-door sedan (1976–present); 2-door coupé (1989–2017); 5-door station wagon (1989–2015)
- Layout: Front-engine, front-wheel-drive

Chronology
- Predecessor: Honda 1300

The Honda Accord (Japanese: ホンダ・アコード, Hepburn: Honda Akōdo; /əˈkɔːrd/), also known as the Honda Inspire (Japanese: ホンダ・インスパイア, Hepburn: Honda Insupaia) in Japan and China for certain generations, is a series of automobiles manufactured by Honda since 1976, best known for its four-door sedan variant, which has been one of the best-selling cars in the United States since 1989. Worldwide, over 19 million units of the car have been sold, making it one of the best-selling automobiles of all time. The Accord nameplate has been applied to a variety of vehicles worldwide, including coupes, station wagons, hatchbacks, and a Honda Crosstour crossover.

== Overview ==
Since its initiation, Honda has offered several different car body styles and versions of the Accord, and often vehicles marketed under the Accord nameplate concurrently in different regions differ quite substantially. It debuted in 1976, as a compact hatchback, though this style only lasted through 1989, as the lineup was expanded to include a sedan, coupe, and wagon. By the sixth-generation Accord at the end of the 1990s, it evolved into an intermediate vehicle, with one basic platform but with different bodies and proportions to increase its competitiveness against its rivals in different international markets. For the eighth-generation Accord released for the North American market in 2007, Honda had again chosen to move the model further upscale and increase its size. This pushed the Accord sedan from the upper limit of what the U.S. Environmental Protection Agency (EPA) defines as a mid-size car to just above the lower limit of a full-size car, with the coupe still rated as a mid-size car. In 2012, the ninth-generation Accord sedan, with smaller exterior dimensions, was once again classified as a mid-size car at 119 cubic feet (3.4 m^{3}), falling just shy of the "Large Car" classification. However, the tenth-generation Accord sedan, with similar exterior dimensions, returned to full-size car status with its combined interior space of 123 cubic feet (3.5 m^{3}); the coupe was discontinued in 2017.

In 1982, the Accord became the first car from a Japanese manufacturer to be produced in the United States when production commenced in Marysville, Ohio at Honda's Marysville Auto Plant. The Accord has achieved considerable success, especially in the United States, where it was the best-selling Japanese car for sixteen years (1982–97), topping its class in sales in 1991 and 2001, with around ten million vehicles sold. Numerous road tests, past and present, rate the Accord as one of the world's most reliable vehicles. The Accord has been on the Car and Driver 10Best list a record 38 times.

In 1989, the Accord was the first vehicle sold under an import brand to become the best-selling car in the United States. As of 2020, the Accord has sold more than 18 million units. In 2023, Honda announced that Accord production would be moved to the factory in Greensburg, Indiana, to make way for electric vehicle production at the Marysville, Ohio, plant.

In active production since 1976, the Accord is Honda's second longest running passenger car nameplate, after the smaller Civic.

== Background ==
Honda, after establishing itself as a leading manufacturer of motorcycles during the 1950s, began production of cars in 1963. Honda introduced its N360 minicar, compliant with Kei car specifications for the Japanese market, for the 1967 model year. The car had a transverse-mounted front engine, front-wheel drive layout, which would be adopted for the later N600 (1969), H1300 (1970) and Civic (1972) models. Occupying a size niche between mini cars and compact sedans, the Civic offered a combination of economy and practicality with its space-efficient design that had immediate appeal. The Civic gave Honda their first market success competing with manufacturers of standard compact cars, which were the growth segment as sales of mini cars plateaued and waned in the early 1970s, and their first major success in the export market. Honda's CVCC engine technology, which had been under development since 1970, was added to the Civic in December 1973. It had the advantages of not requiring a catalytic converter or unleaded fuel to meet the emissions requirements of the 1970s and early 1980s.

After the well-received launch of the Civic, Honda started development of an upscale model. Honda's original concept for a larger, quieter, more powerful and comfortable car was a four-door sedan powered by a 2000 cc inline-six engine, designated Project 653. According to initial interpreted information, Project 653 was to be a V6 powered competitor to the Ford Mustang, however this was dismissed as a confused interpretation of the design concept. In order to manage development costs, leverage the technology of the Civic, and to adapt the production facilities to the new model, Honda changed their focus to building upon the Civic's successful formula in a larger package. With these new goals, the project was re-designated as Project 671. The body design of the new model was finalised in the fall of 1973, as reported in the December 1975 issue of Motor Trend magazine, which suggests that work under Project 671 had been advancing in the months prior. However, one account of the timeline reports that mechanical engineering for Project 671 got underway in 1974. Until production of the new model, intensive engineering efforts were carried out to make the CVCC engine quieter and more suited to higher cruising speeds, to refine the suspension for better ride and handling, to develop a power steering system suitable for a lightweight compact car, and to improve noise damping in the body and frame. Extensive pre-production testing was performed under a wide variety of conditions, to ensure the Accord's suitability for use under different driving conditions.

For the new model, Honda chose the name "Accord", reflecting "Honda's desire for accord and harmony between people, society and the automobile." German manufacturer Opel unsuccessfully sued Honda, claiming that the name was too similar to their Rekord.

The Accord's final design, with an extended nose and extended coupe cabin with a sloping hatchback rear, was a logical derivation of the hatchback design of the Civic and provided ample leeway for the use of Civic-derived components. It showed similarity to the Volkswagen Scirocco, which had been introduced in January 1974, leading to speculation that the design was copied from the Scirocco. However, the Accord's design had been finalised months prior to the Scirocco's introduction.

== First generation (1976) ==
First generation
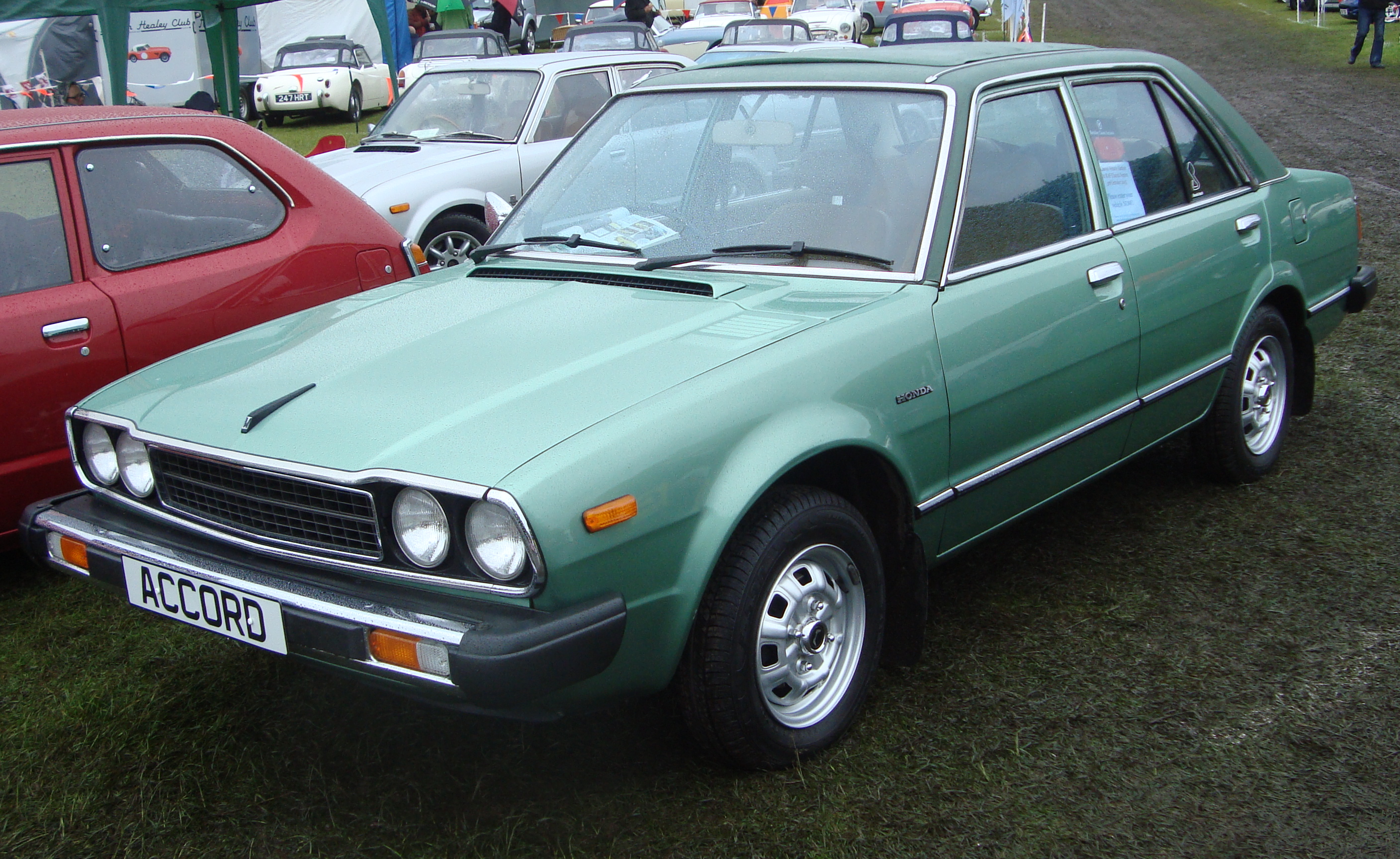

Overview
- Model code: SJ/SM
- Production: 1976–1981
- Model years: 1977–1982
- Assembly: Sayama Plant, Sayama, Saitama, Japan; North Jakarta, Indonesia (PT. Prospect Motor); Johor Bahru, Malaysia (OASB)

Body and chassis
- Class: Compact car
- Body style: 3-door hatchback; 4-door sedan

Powertrain
- Engine: 1.6 L EL1 I4; 1.6 L EF I4; 1.6 L EP I4; 1.8 L EK1 I4
- Transmission: 2-speed automatic; 3-speed automatic; 5-speed manual

Dimensions
- Wheelbase: 2,380 mm (93.7 in)
- Length: 4,450 mm (175.2 in) (sedan); 4,135 mm (162.8 in) (hatchback)
- Width: 1,620 mm (63.8 in)
- Height: 1,360 mm (53.5 in) (sedan); 1,335 mm (52.6 in) (hatchback)
- Curb weight: 890–945 kg (1,962–2,083 lb)

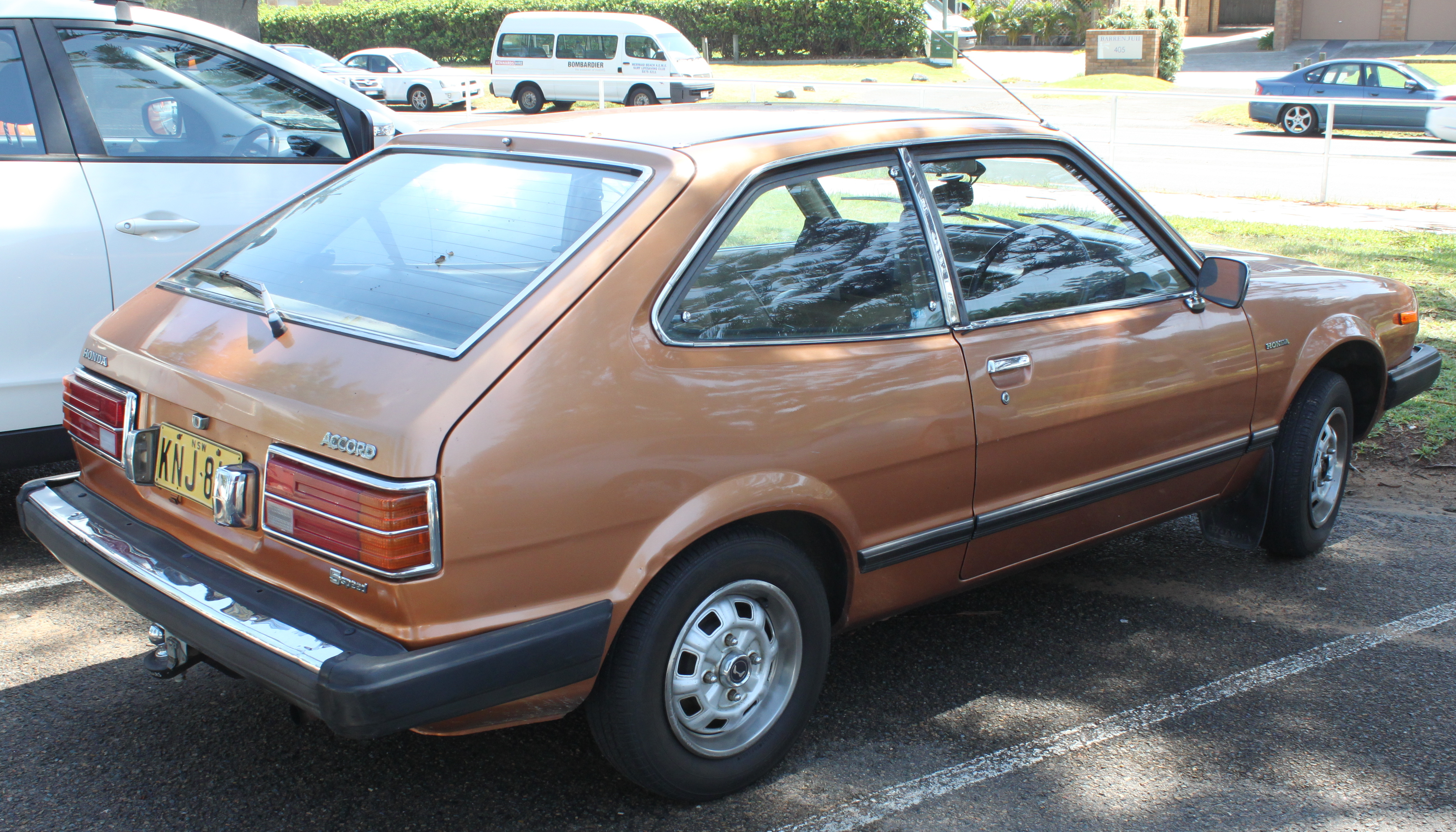
Hatchback (facelift)

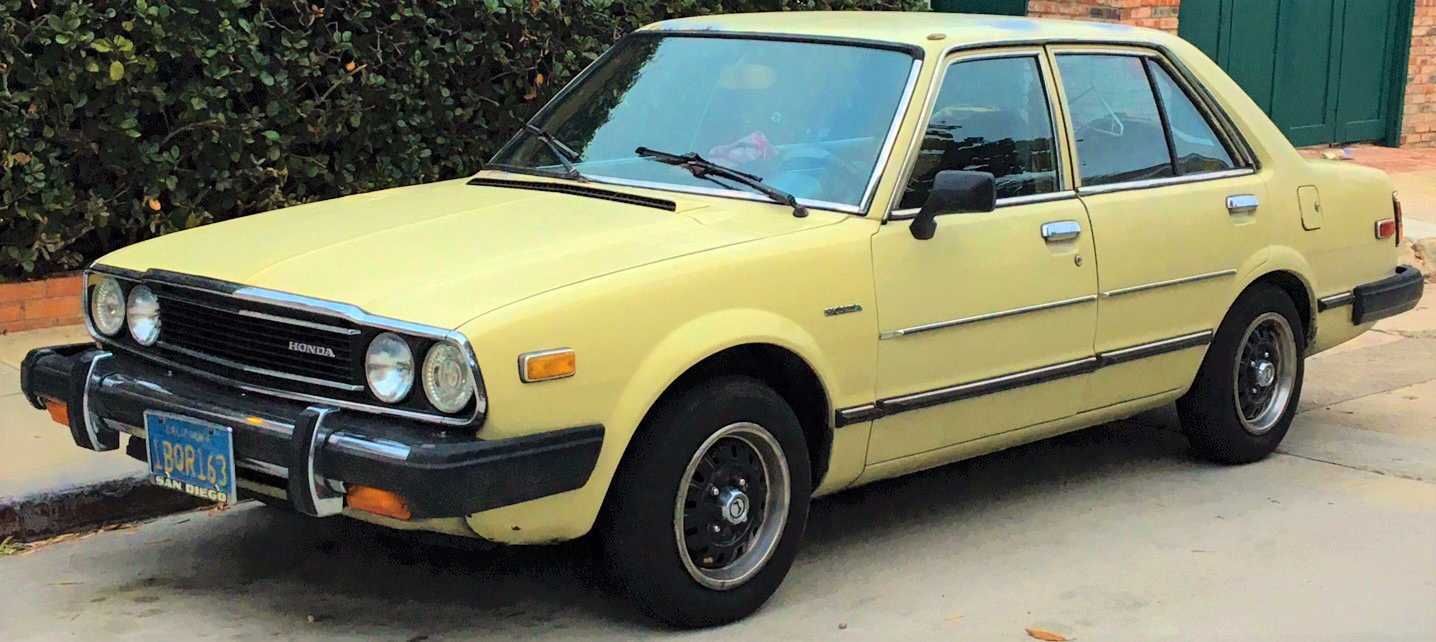

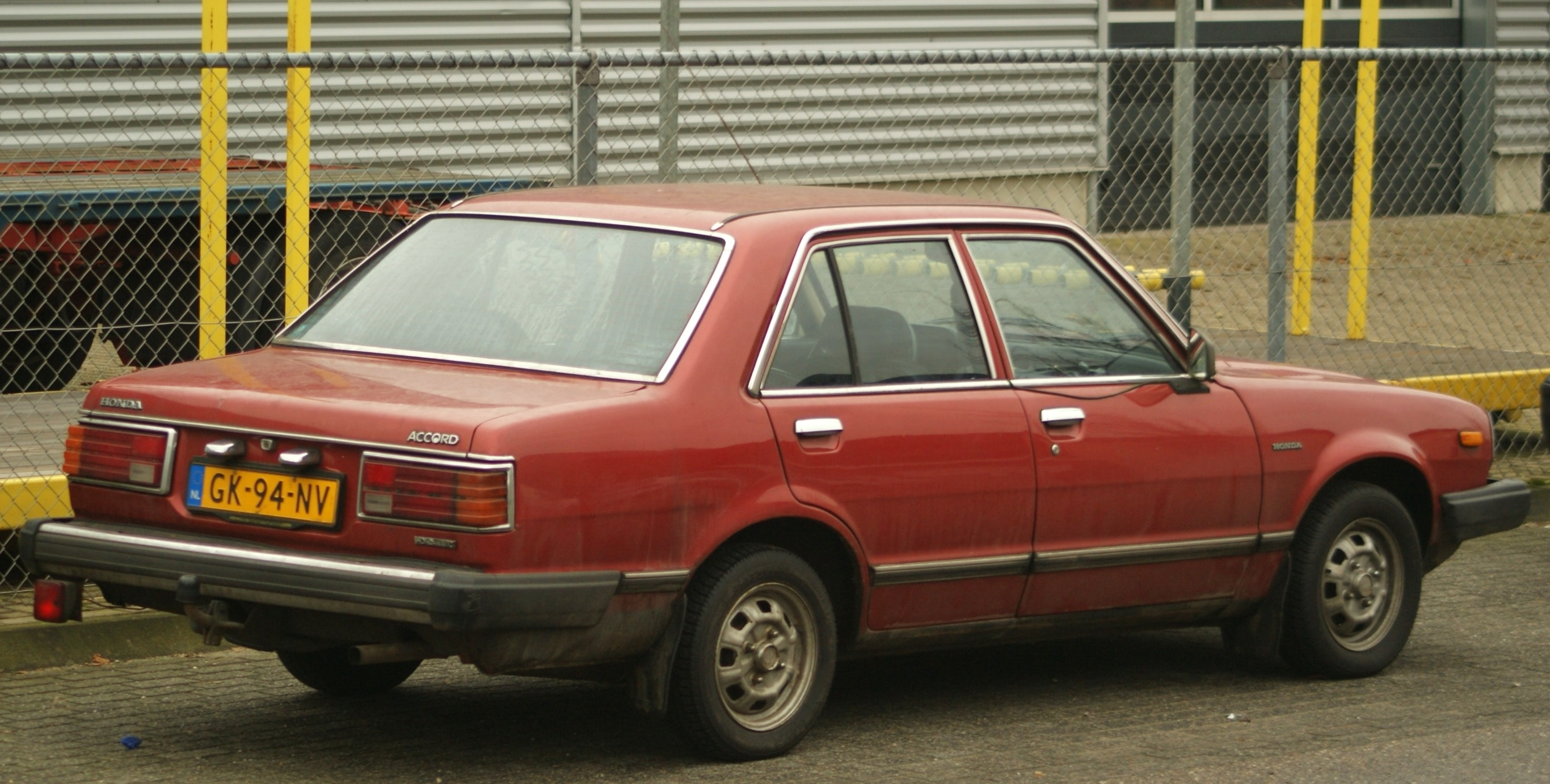
Sedan (facelift)

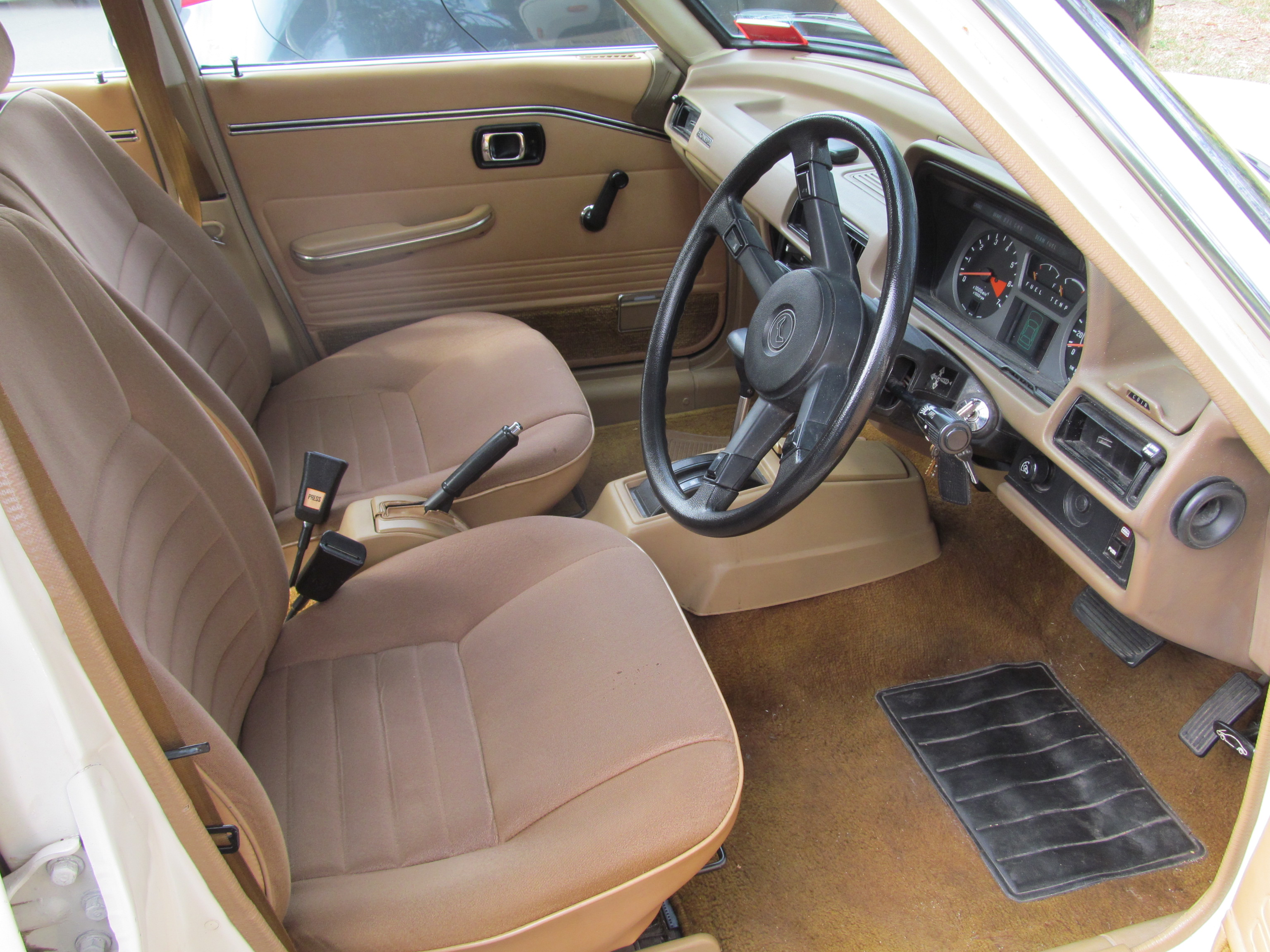
1981 Accord interior

The first-generation Honda Accord was launched on 7 May 1976, as a three-door hatchback with 80 PS (59 kW) JIS (similar to SAE Gross), a 2,380 mm (93.7 in) wheelbase, and a weight of about 900 kg (2,000 lb). North American market cars claimed 68 hp (51 kW), while European and other export markets received a model without emissions control equipment; it claimed 80 PS (59 kW) as well but according to the stricter DIN norm. It was a platform expansion of the earlier Honda Civic at 4,125 mm (162 in) long. The engine was a long-stroke derivative of the Civic's 1.2 and 1.5-liter engines. To comply with gradually tightening emission regulations enacted in Japan, the engine was fitted with Honda's CVCC technology.

The Accord sold well due to its moderate size and excellent fuel economy. It was one of the first Japanese sedans with features like cloth seats, a tachometer, intermittent wipers, and an AM/FM radio as standard equipment. In 1978 an LX version of the hatchback was added which came with air conditioning, a digital clock, and power steering. Until the Accord, and the closely related Prelude, power steering had not been available to cars under two litres. Japanese buyers were liable for slightly more annual road tax over the smaller Civic, which had a smaller engine.

On 14 October 1977 (a year later in the U.S. market), a four-door sedan was added to the lineup, and power went to 72 hp (54 kW) when the 1,599 cc (97.6 cu in) EF1 engine was supplemented and in certain markets replaced by the 1,751 cc (106.9 cu in) an EK1 unit, producing 72 hp (54 kW) with the GK-5 5-speed transaxle, or 68 hp (51 kW) with the 2-speed Hondamatic. Technically, the sedan was not changed from the hatchback, and the wheelbase remained the same as well. This did result in a rather long rear overhang to fit a full-sized boot. The roof was a bit taller so as to provide more interior comfort, and the Accord Sedan was the first Honda in Japan to be offered with typically Japanese middle-class extras such as ornate hubcaps and lace seat covers.

In the U.S. market, the sedan was available in three colours: Livorno Beige with beige cloth interior, Silver with maroon cloth interior, or dark red with maroon cloth interior. In 1980 the optional two-speed semi-automatic "Hondamatic" transmission of previous years became a three-speed fully automatic gearbox (a four-speed automatic transaxle was not used in the Accord until the 1983 model year). The North American versions had slightly redesigned bumper trim. Other changes included new grilles and taillamps and remote mirrors added on the four-door (chrome) and the LX (black plastic) models. The CVCC badges were deleted, but the CVCC induction system remained. At the same time, California-specification engines received a four-port exhaust valve head and a catalytic converter. This version of the EK1 engine was equivalent to the 1981 49-state High Altitude engine, omitting the air jet controller device that helped maintain the proper mixture at higher altitudes (above 4000 feet). The horsepower increased from 72 hp (54 kW) for 5-speed cars and 68 hp (51 kW) for automatic cars with the two-port 49-state engine to 75 hp (56 kW), like the 1981-83 versions.

In North America, the 1981 model year only brought detail changes such as new fabrics and some new colour combinations. Livorno Beige (code No. Y-39) was replaced by Oslo Ivory (No. YR-43). Dark brown was discontinued, as was the bronze metallic. A bit later in 1981, and SE 4-door model was added for the first time, with Novillo leather seats and power windows. The paint colour was NH-77M Glacier Gray with a gray interior. Base model hatchbacks, along with the four-door, LX, and SE four-door, all received the same smaller black plastic remote mirror. The instrument cluster was revised with mostly pictograms which replaced the worded warning lights and gauge markings. The shifter was redesigned to have a stronger spring to prevent unintentional engagement of reverse, replacing the spring-loaded shift knob of the 1976 to 1980 model year cars. The shift lever was also shortened by a couple of inches, with a larger thread diameter, allowing usage of later Honda shift knobs, including the rectangular knob used on all 1986 and newer Accords.

== Second generation (1981) ==
Second generation
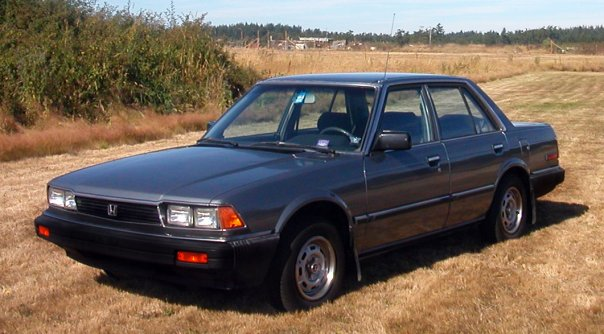

Overview
- Model code: SY/SZ/AC/AD
- Also called: Honda Vigor (Japan)
- Production: 1981–1985
- Model years: 1982–1985
- Assembly: Sayama, Saitama, Japan; Marysville, Ohio, United States (Marysville Auto Plant); Nelson, New Zealand (Honda New Zealand); North Jakarta, Indonesia (PT. Prospect Motor); Johor Bahru, Malaysia (OASB); Bangkok, Thailand (Honda Cars (Thailand) Co.)
- Designer: Yukio Kurosu (1979)

Body and chassis
- Class: Compact car
- Body style: 3-door hatchback; 4-door sedan

Powertrain
- Engine: 1.6 L (1,598 cc) EY 12-valve I4 (facelift); 1.6 L (1,602 cc) EL1 I4 (1981–1983); 1.8 L (1,751 cc) EK1 I4 (1981–1983); 1.8 L (1,829 cc) ES2 12-valve I4 (facelift); 1.8 L (1,829 cc) ES3 12-valve EFI I4 (1984–1985)
- Transmission: 5-speed manual; 3-speed Hondamatic; 4-speed automatic

Dimensions
- Wheelbase: 2,450 mm (96.5 in)
- Length: 4,410 mm (173.6 in) (sedan); 4,210 mm (165.7 in) (hatchback)
- Width: 1,660 mm (65.4 in)
- Height: 1,375 mm (54.1 in) (sedan); 1,355 mm (53.3 in) (hatchback)
- Curb weight: 954–1,011 kg (2,103–2,229 lb)

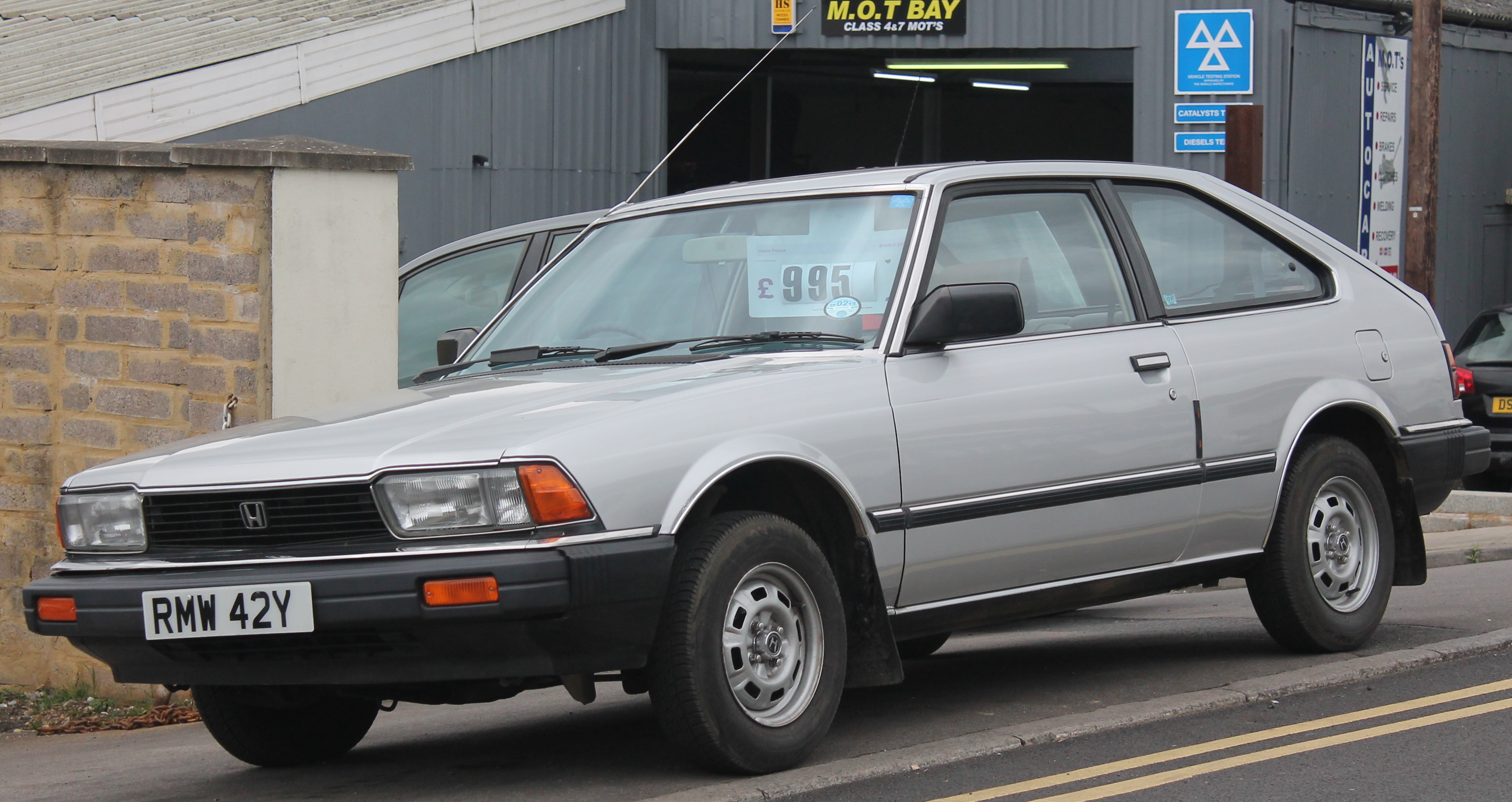

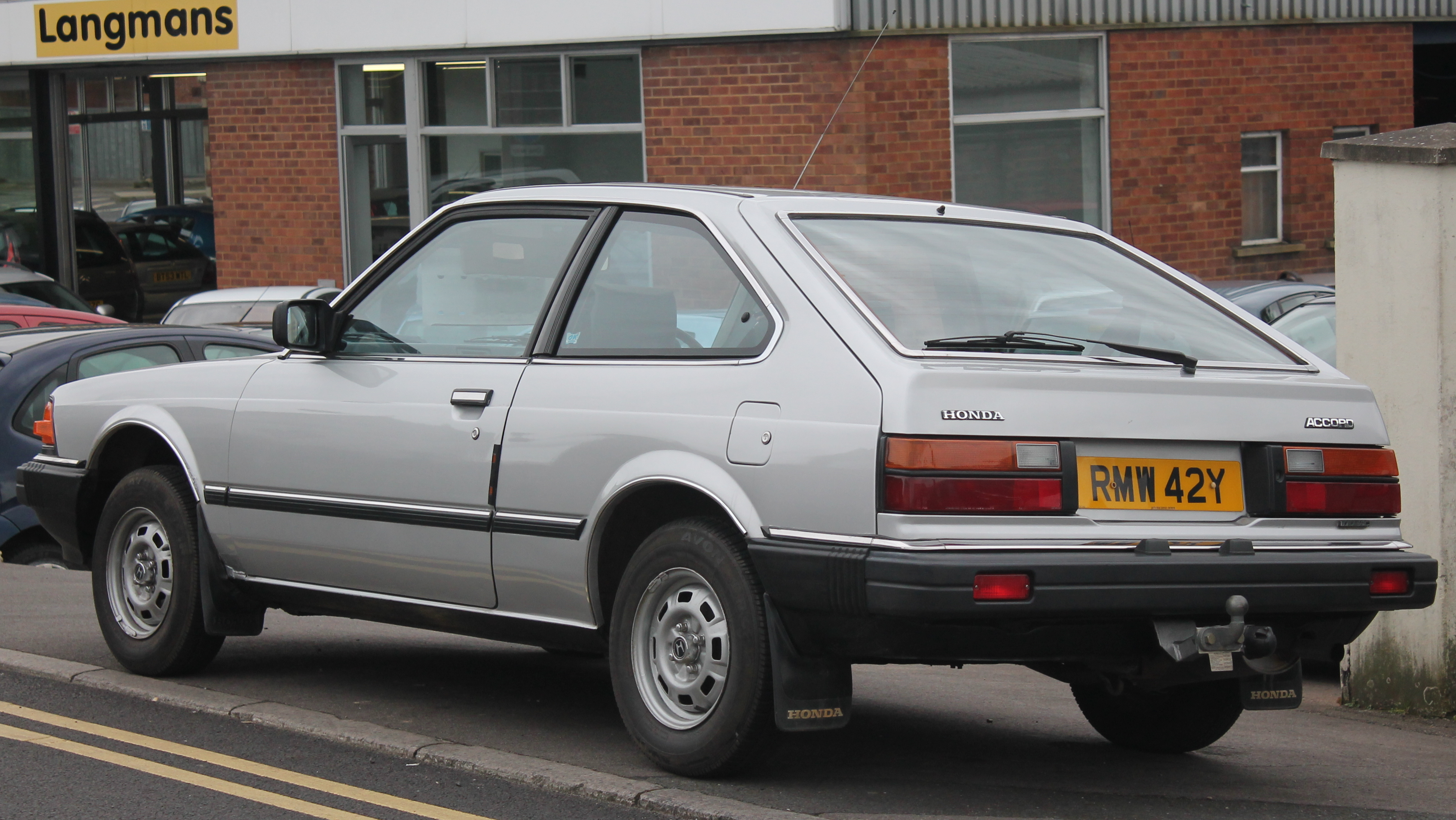
Hatchback (pre-facelift, UK)

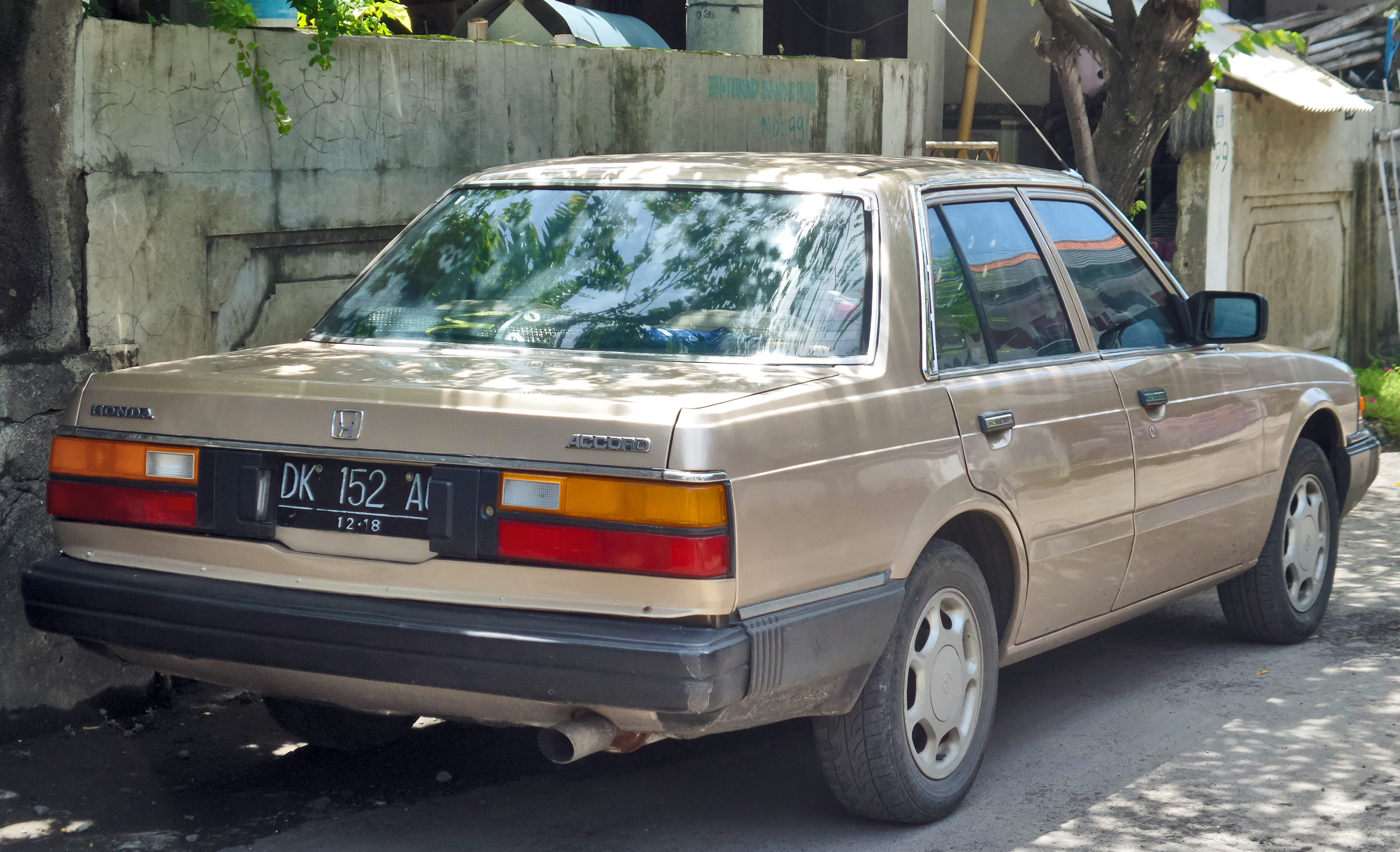
Sedan (pre-facelift, Indonesia)

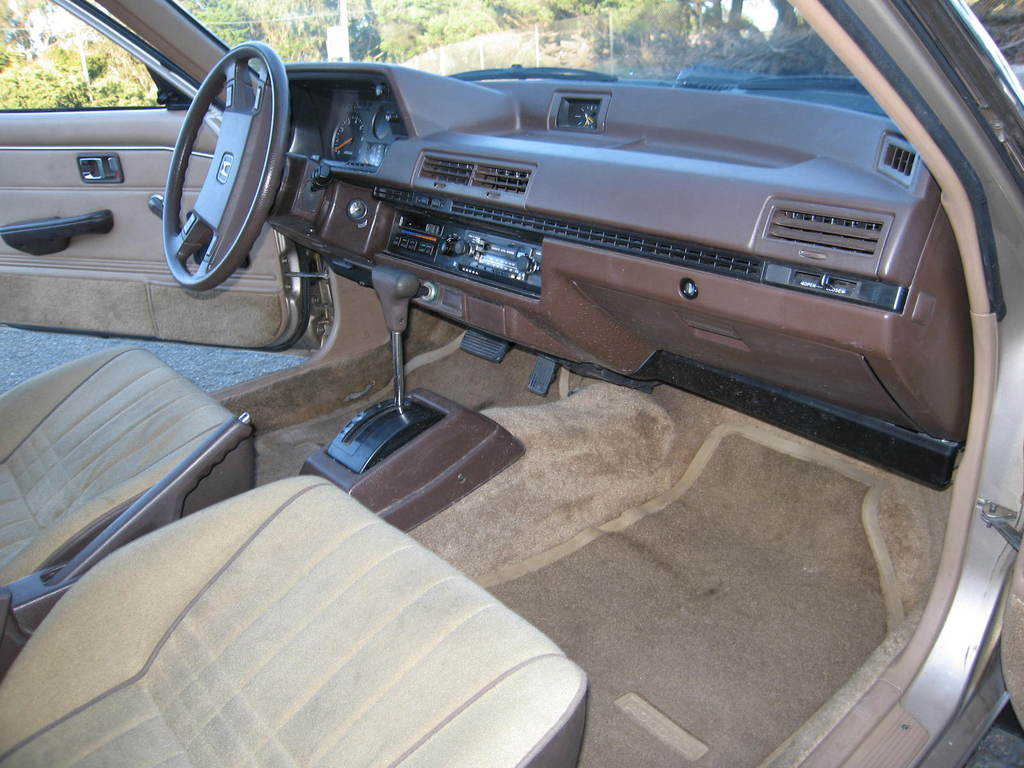
Interior (post-facelift)

Debuted on 22 September 1981, in Japan, Europe, and North America, this generation of the Accord being produced in Japan, also became the first to be built in the United States, at Honda's plant in Marysville, Ohio. Since its first year in the American market, it also became the best-selling Japanese nameplate in the United States, retaining that position for about 15 years. In Japan, a sister model called the Honda Vigor was launched simultaneously with the new Accord. This allowed Honda to sell the product at different sales channels called Honda Clio, which sold the Accord, and Honda Verno, which sold the Vigor.

Modernizing the interior and exterior, the second-generation Accord was mechanically very similar to the original, using the same 1,751 cc (1.8 L; 106.9 cu in) EK-1 CVCC engine in the Japanese market. Vehicles with a manual transmission and the CVCC carburetor earned 13.6 km/L (38 mpg_{‑imp}; 32 mpg_{‑US}) based on Japanese Government emissions tests using 10 different modes of scenario standards, and 110 PS (81 kW; 108 bhp), and 23 km/L (65 mpg_{‑imp}; 54 mpg_{‑US}) with consistently maintained speeds at 60 km/h. European market cars received the tested 1.6-litre EL1 engine with 80 PS (59 kW; 79 bhp) DIN at 5000 rpm.

This car included popular features of the time such as shag carpet, velour cabin trim, and chrome accents. An optional extra on the 1981 Accord was an Electro Gyrocator, the world's first automatic in-car navigation system. Japanese market cars were available in Silver, Sky Blue, and Beige. The LX hatchback offered a digital clock and slightly higher fuel economy (due to its lighter weight). In Europe, the Accord was available as a fairly well equipped (for the time) standard version, as well as a very luxurious EX model at a modest upcharge.

In the United States, Federal lighting regulations required headlamps of sealed beam construction and standard size and shape on all vehicles, so Accords in North America were equipped with four rectangular headlamp units rather than the aerodynamic composite replaceable-bulb units used on Accords sold outside North America (note European specification imagery). Other Automotive lighting variations included amber front and red rear side marker lights and reflectors in North America, and headlamp washers and a red rear fog lamp for European markets. Japanese-market Accords were unique from all other markets in that they offered adjustable ride height control and side-view mirrors installed on the mid-forward wings.

In November 1982, Honda made a fully four-speed automatic available with the 1.8-litre engine, a major improvement over the earlier, three-speed semi-automatic "Hondamatic" transmission. This quickly filtered through to export markets, where the outdated Hondamatic was soon superseded entirely. The manual five-speed transmission remained unchanged. A new 120 mph speedometer replaced the earlier 88 mph unit. The Special Edition (SE) featured Novillo leather seating, power windows, a power sunroof, and door locks. Gray was added as a colour option. A slightly modified EK-2 engine was introduced, replacing the earlier EK-1, albeit still carbureted.

=== 1983 facelift ===
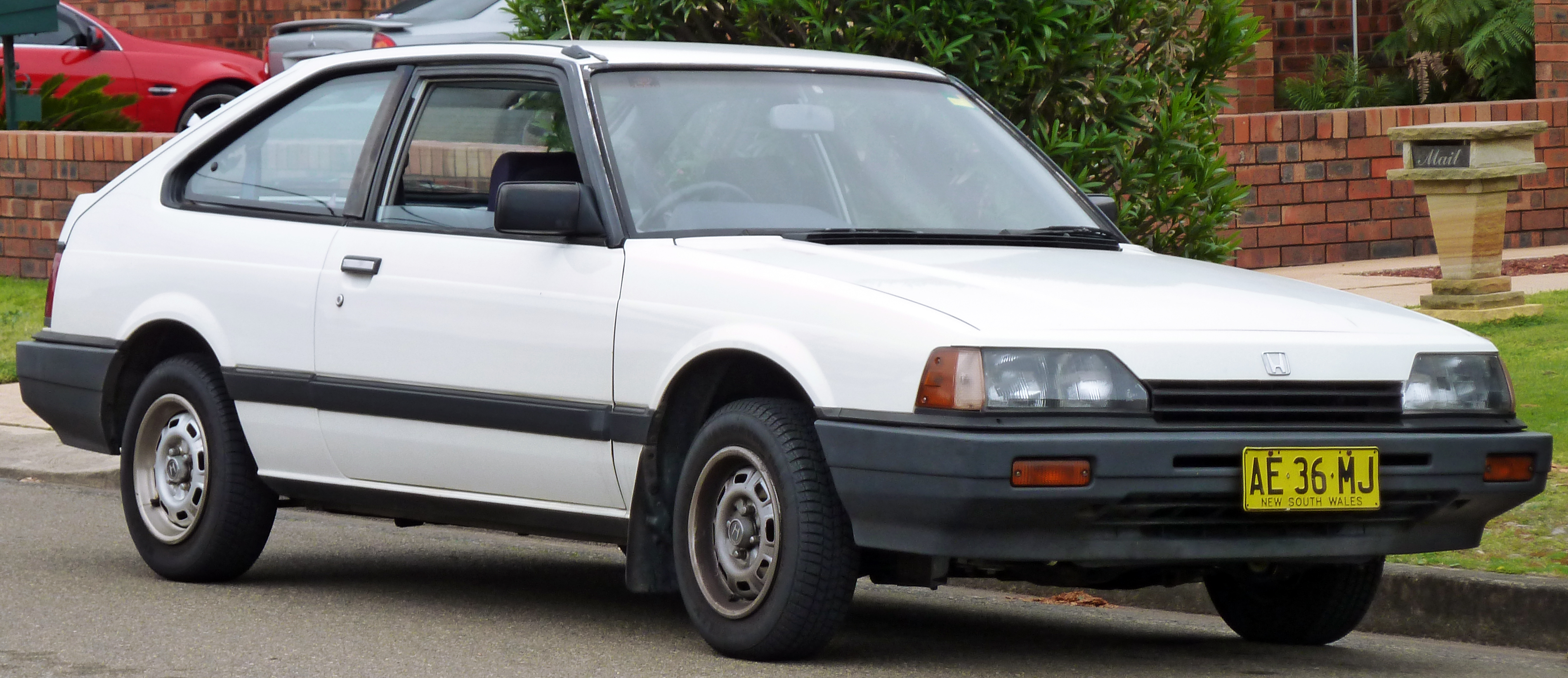

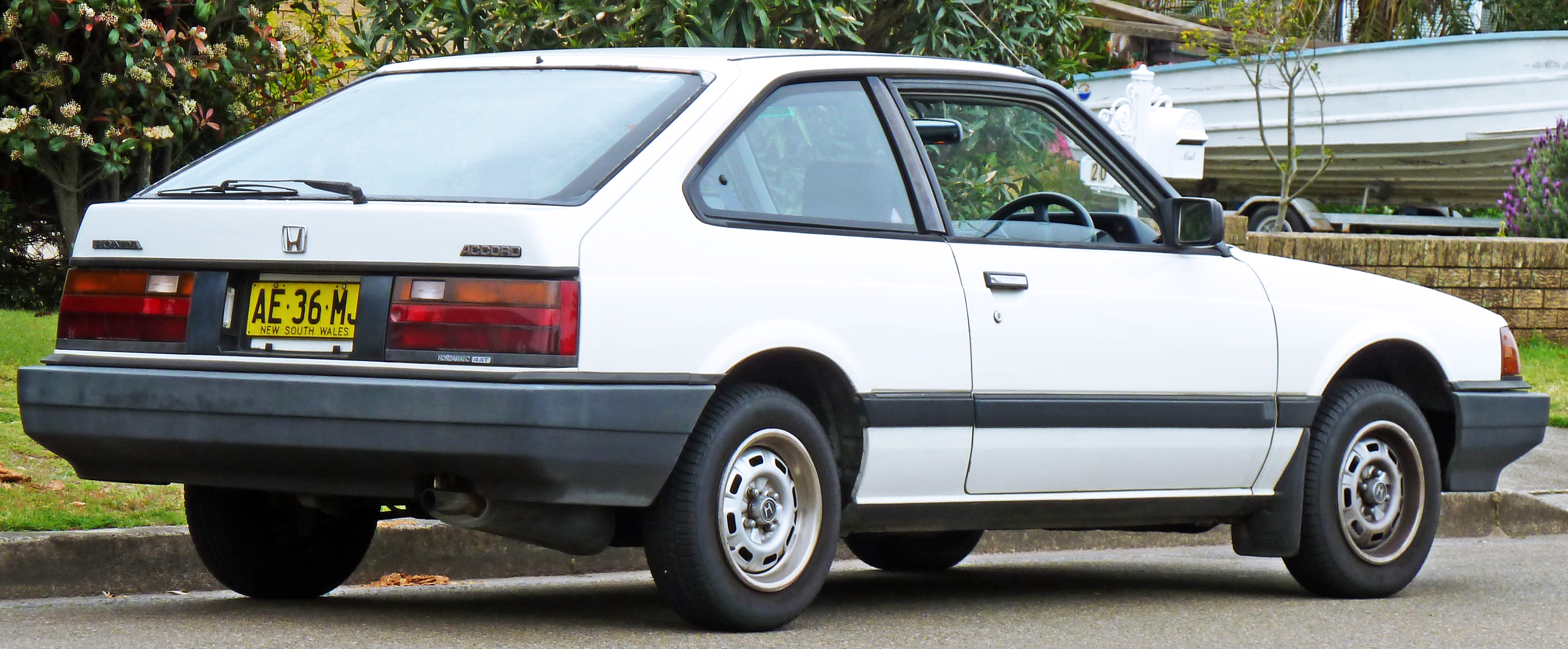
Hatchback (facelift, Australia)

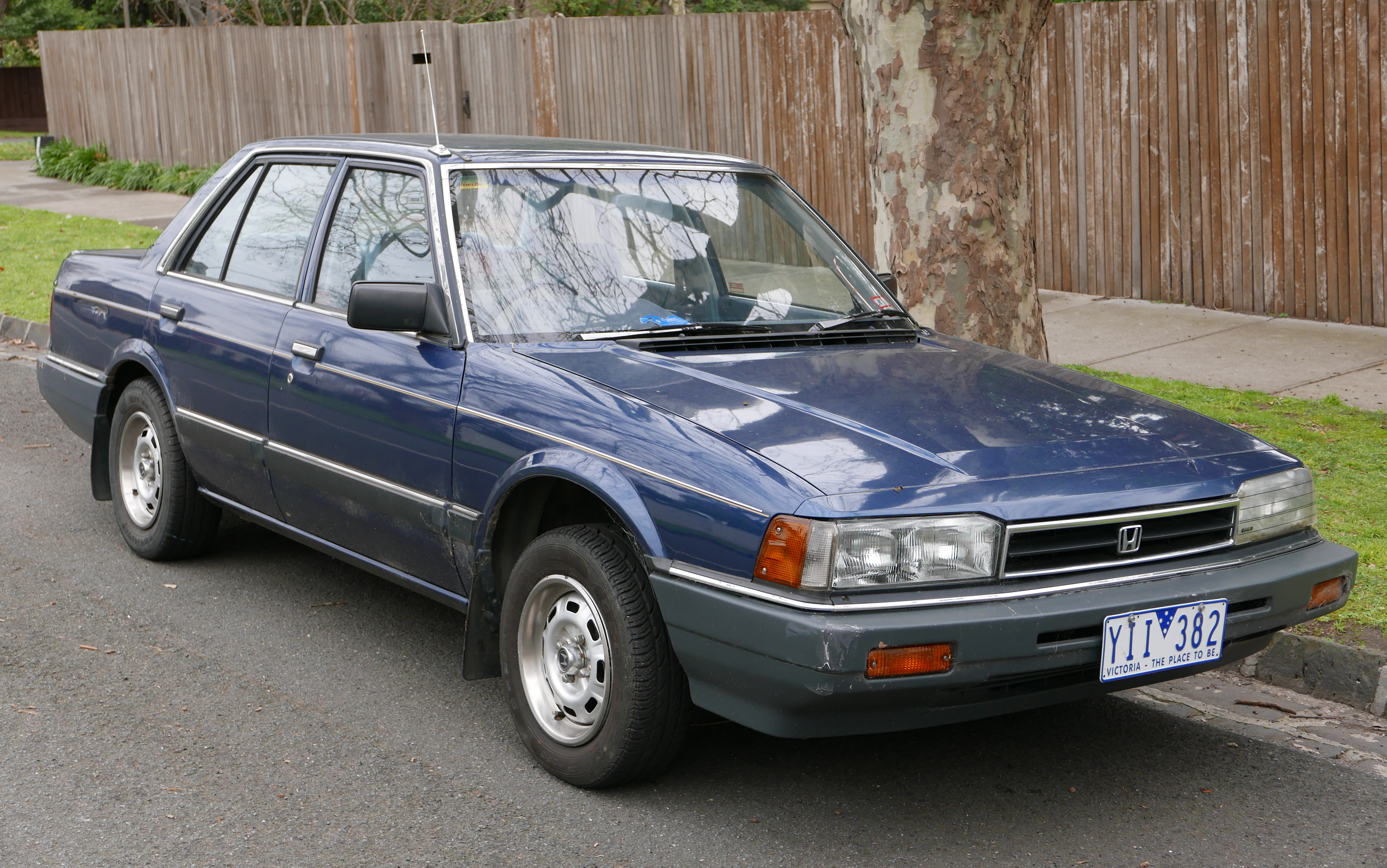

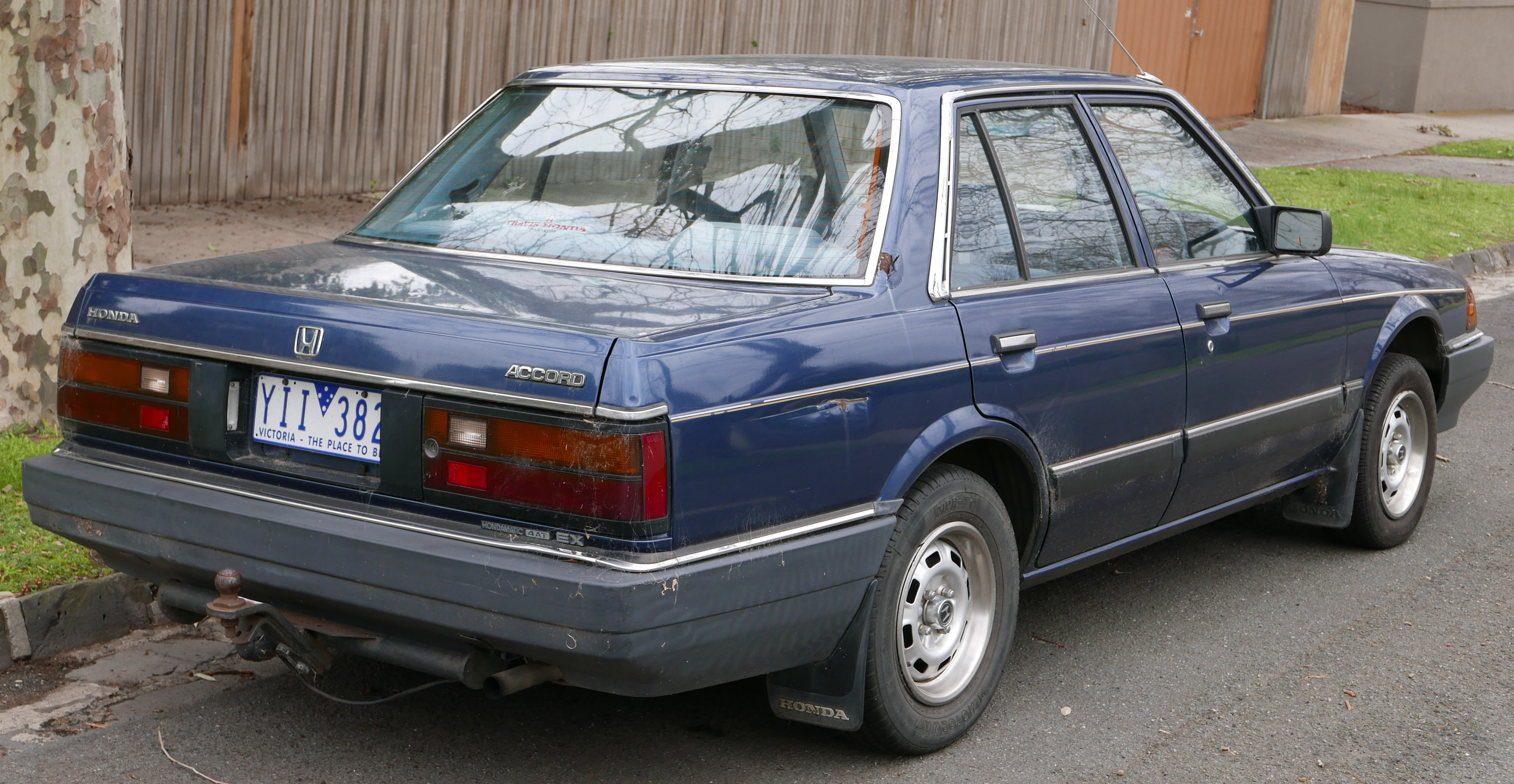
Sedan (facelift, Australia)

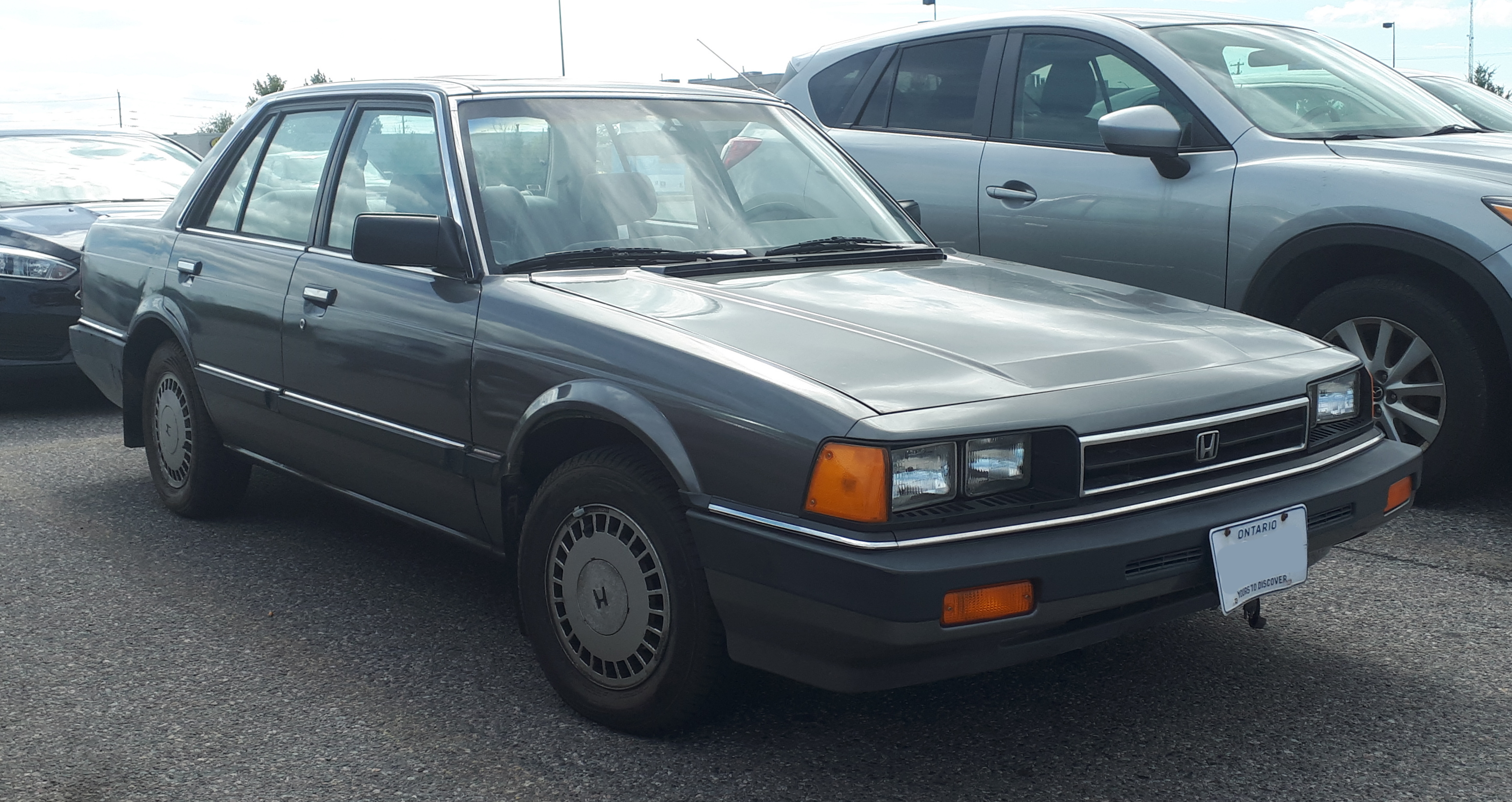

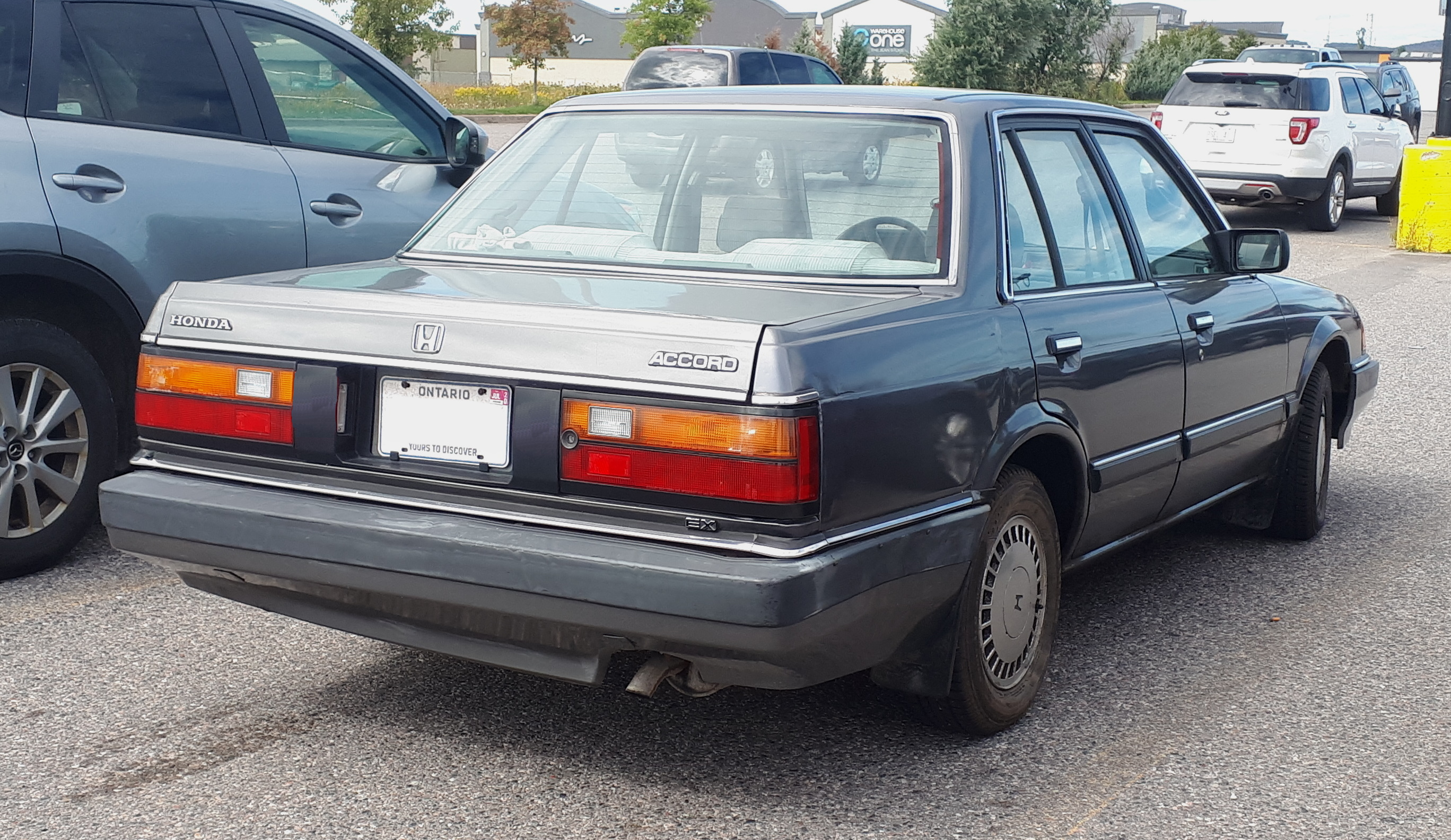
Sedan (facelift, Canada)

By 1983, Accords sold in the eastern United States were produced at the new Marysville plant, with quality considered equal to those produced in Japan. In June 1983, for the 1984 model year, the Accord body was restyled with a slightly downward beveled nose and a new series of 12-valve CVCC powerplants. Globally there was a 1.6 (EY) and also the slightly more powerful 1,829 cc (1.8 L; 111.6 cu in) ES2 engine, yielding 86 bhp (64 kW) in federal trim. Honda integrated rear side marker lights and reflectors into the side of the tail light units. European Accords now included a side turn signal repeater just behind each front wheel well. The U.S. requirement for standardised headlamps was rescinded in late 1983, but North American Accords continued to use sealed beams until the fourth-generation models were released in 1989.

The LX offered velour upholstery, auto-reverse cassette stereo, air conditioning, cruise control, power brakes, power steering, power windows and power door locks (sedan only), a digital clock, roof pillar antenna, a thick black belt moldings, integrated bumpers, and flush plastic mock-alloy style wheels covers that resembled those of the trend-setting Audi 5000. Supplies were tight; in the Eastern states the wait was months for a Graphite Gray sedan, a then-popular colour. The LX hatchback was the only 1984 version of the Accord to include dual side-view mirrors.

The 1983 Accord SE Sedan carried over features of the 1981 SE Sedan, including leather interior, power windows, power antenna, and aluminum alloy wheels. Some new features included a seven-band graphic equaliser, power booster, and Dolby music sensor for the AM/FM cassette stereo system, and a power glass moonroof. Only one colour was offered in the SE trim: Dove Gray.

The 1984 sedan was available in four exterior colours: Greek White and three metallic options: Columbus Gray, Regency Red (burgundy), and Stratos Blue (steel). The regular hatchback was available in Greek White, Dominican Red, and metallic Stratos Blue. The 1984 LX hatchback came in three metallic colours only: Graphite Gray, Regency Red, and Copper Brown.

It was one of the first Japanese engineered vehicles to offer computer controlled fuel-injection with one injector per cylinder, also known as multiple port fuel injection. This arrived on 24 May 1984 on the ES series 1.8 L engine, and was known as Honda's Programmed Fuel Injection, or PGM-FI. This option was not offered until 1985 in the United States market. Vehicles with PGM-FI (ES3 series engine) earned 13.2 km/L (37 mpg_{‑imp}; 31 mpg_{‑US}) based on Japanese Government emissions tests using ten different modes of scenario standards, with 130 PS (96 kW; 128 hp), and 22 km/L (62 mpg_{‑imp}; 52 mpg_{‑US}) with consistently maintained speeds at 60 km/h (37 mph).

In 1985, the Special Edition returned as the SE-i, capitalizing on the final year of the second generation's production. A fuel-injected 101 bhp (75 kW) non-CVCC ES3 engine was exclusive to this model. The moniker, SE-i, was adapted from the SE trim, but included the "-i" to signify the higher trim level's fuel-injected engine. This 12-valve, 1,829 cc (1.8 L; 111.6 cu in) engine was the first non-CVCC engine used in an Accord and was the same basic engine design used by Honda until 1989. Like the previous SE trim in 1983, the SE-i featured Novillo leather seating, power moonroof, bronze-tinted glass, a premium sound system with cassette, and 13-inch alloy wheels. The luxury equipment features on the SE-i paralleled the same features offered on the Honda Vigor VTL-i, which was only sold in Japan. Two colours were offered: Graphite Gray Metallic and Barley Brown Metallic.

Available options differed from market to market. The 1.8-litre engine, updated four-speed automatic transmission, and 'EX' trim level options were first made available in New Zealand during the 1984 model year refresh alongside the 1.6-litre 'LX' model.

Japan generally received more options earlier than the rest of the world. In 1981, the Accord offered an adjustable ride height air suspension in the Japanese market. From 1983 in Japan and 1984 in Europe, the second-generation Accord was available with anti-lock brakes (called ALB) as an option. This braking system was the first time that an Accord used four-wheel disc brakes. Fuel injection became available in 1984 in the Japanese market with the earlier introduction of the ES3 engine in the SE-i. Models took a year to arrive in North American and European markets with less stringent emissions laws continuing, using carburetors throughout second-generation production.

== Third generation (1985) ==
Third generation
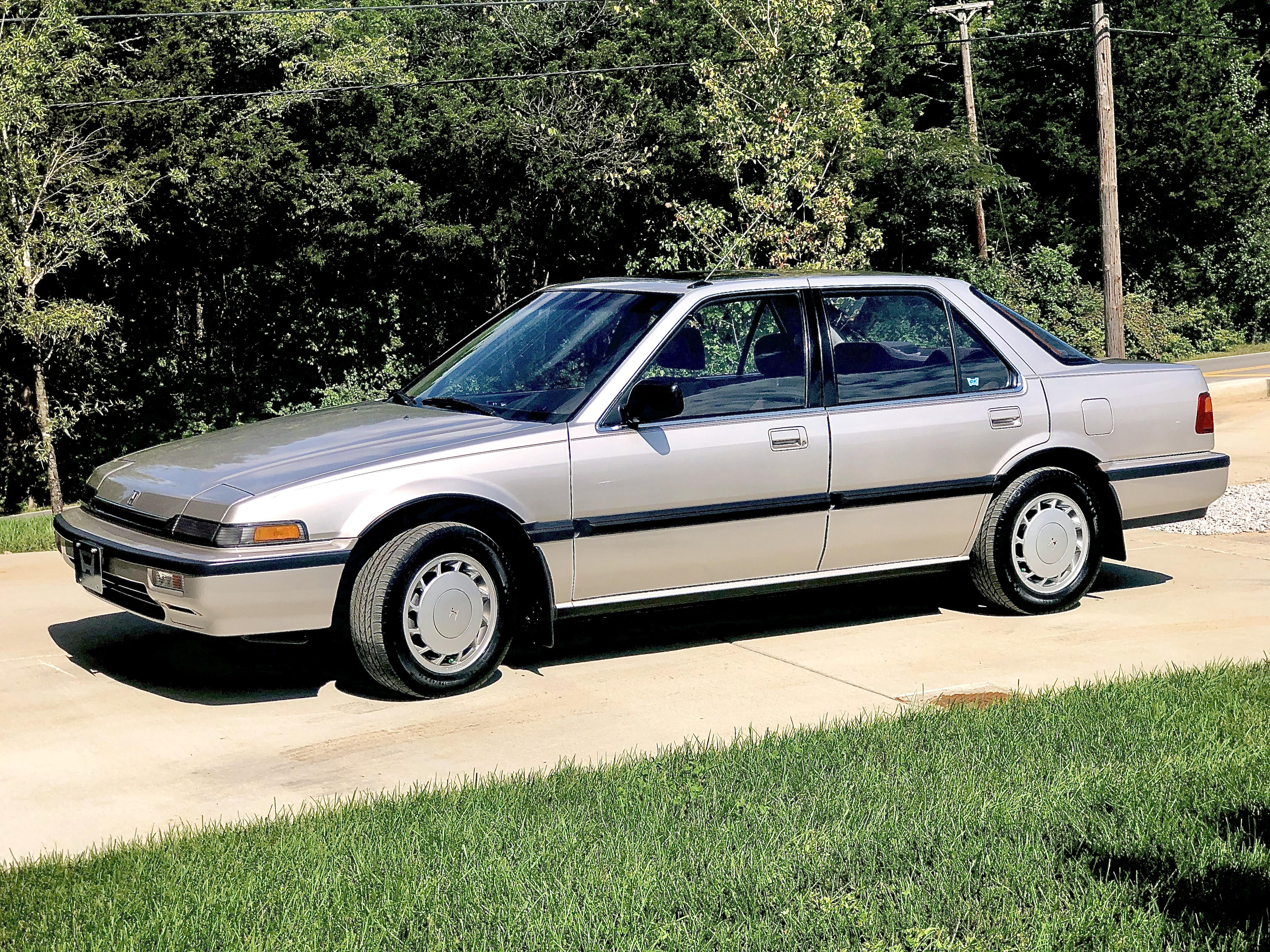
- Accord LX-i sedan

Overview
- Also called: Honda Vigor (Japan)
- Production: 1985–1989
- Model years: 1986–1989
- Assembly: Sayama, Saitama, Japan; Marysville, Ohio (Marysville Auto Plant); Alliston, Canada (HCM); Petone/Nelson, New Zealand (New Zealand Motor Corporation/Honda New Zealand); Ayuthaya, Thailand (Honda Cars (Thailand) Co.); North Jakarta, Indonesia (PT. Prospect Motor); Johor Bahru, Malaysia (OASB)
- Designer: Toshi Oshika (1983)

Body and chassis
- Class: Compact car
- Body style: 2-door coupe; 3-door hatchback; 3-door shooting-brake (AeroDeck); 4-door sedan

Powertrain
- Engine: 1.6 L A16A1 I4 (CA4); 1.8 L A18A I4 (CA1); 1.8 L B18A DOHC I4 (CA2); 2.0 L A20A I4 (CA5/6); 2.0 L B20A DOHC I4 (CA3)
- Transmission: 4-speed automatic; 5-speed manual

Dimensions
- Wheelbase: 2,600 mm (102.4 in)
- Length: Hatchback: 4,440 mm (174.8 in); 1985–1987 Sedan: 4,549 mm (179.1 in); 1987–1989 Sedan & Coupe: 4,564 mm (179.7 in)
- Width: 1,695 mm (67 in); US Sedan: 1,712 mm (67.4 in)
- Height: Hatchback & Coupe: 1,336 mm (52.6 in); Sedan: 1,356 mm (53.4 in)
- Curb weight: 1,096–1,174 kg (2,416–2,588 lb) (manual)

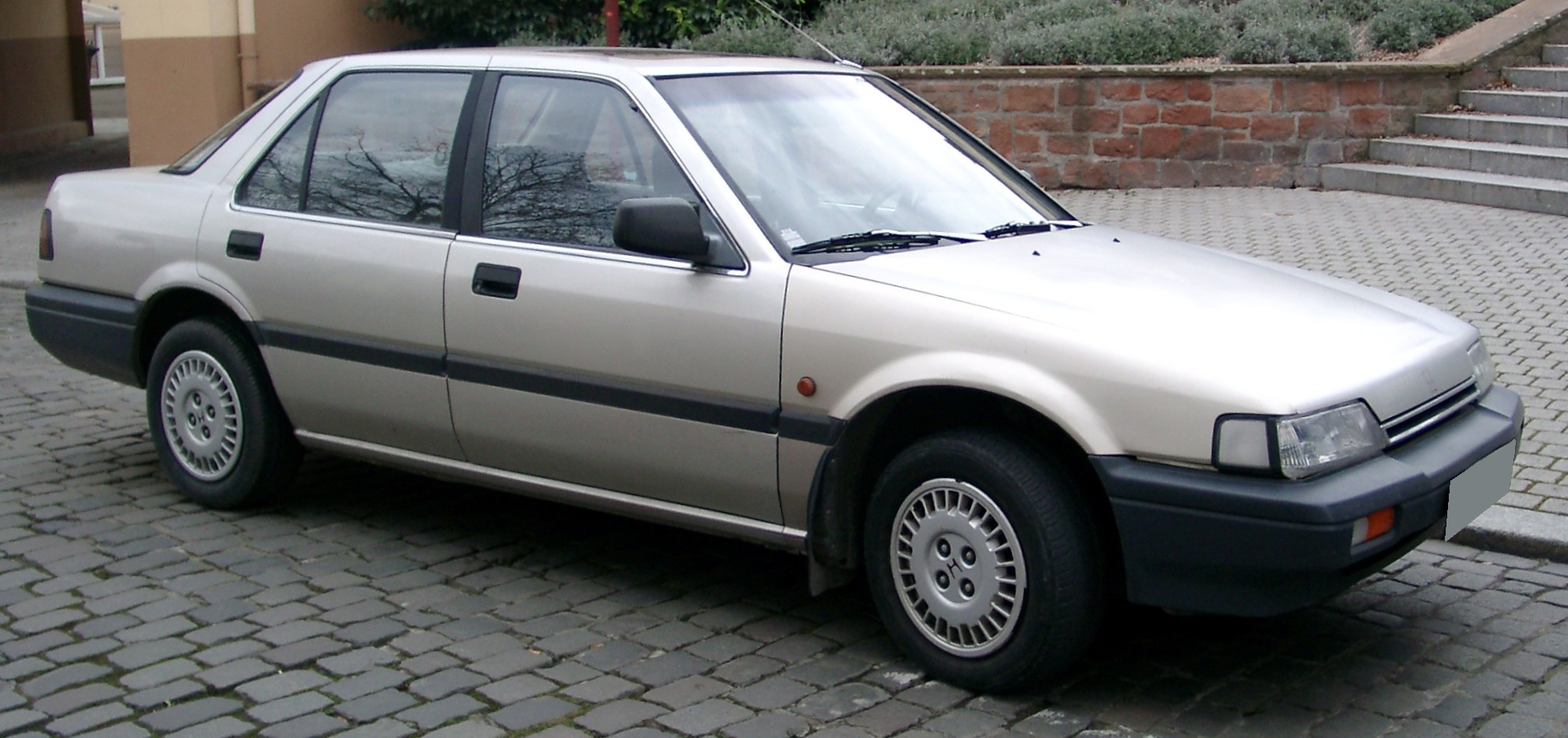
Accord EX sedan without hidden headlamps

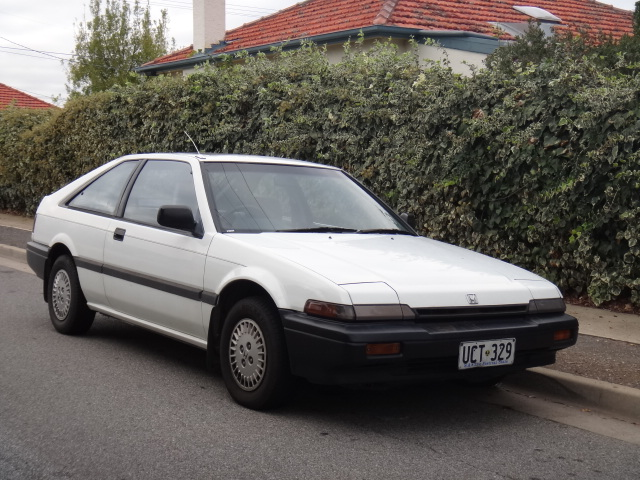
Accord EX hatchback

The third-generation Accord was introduced in Japan on 4 June 1985 and in Europe and North America later that year. It had a very striking exterior design styled by Toshi Oshika in 1983, that resonated well with buyers internationally. One notable feature was the hidden headlamps. Because this generation was also sold as the Honda Vigor, the Accord received the hidden headlamps. Honda's Japanese dealership channel called Honda Verno all had styling elements that helped identify products only available at Honda Verno. As a result, Japanese market Accords had a Honda Verno styling feature but were sold at newly established Japanese dealerships Honda Clio with the all-new, luxury Honda Legend sedan, and international Accords were now visually aligned with the Prelude, the CR-X, and the new Integra.

The retractable headlamps of the third generation Accord sedan were in Japan, USA, Canada, Australia, New Zealand, KY region (Arabian countries), and on cars in Taiwan that were imported from the United States. In other countries, the Accord sedan had conventional headlamps, including in Japan from July 1987, on the "Accord CA" – with CA standing for "Continental Accord". Accords in all other bodies (hatchback, AeroDeck, coupe) had only retractable headlamps worldwide.

At its introduction in 1985, it won the Car of the Year Japan Award.

The third-generation Accord became the first Honda to employ double wishbones at both the front and rear ends. While more expensive than competitors' MacPherson strut systems, this setup provided better stability and sharper handling for the vehicle. All had front sway bars and upper models had rear sway bars as well. Brakes were either small all-wheel discs with twin-piston calipers (available on the Japanese-market all 2.0-Si models and since May 1987 on other trim levels with optional 4-wheel Anti-Lock Brake System), larger all-wheel discs with single-piston calipers or a front disc/rear drum system. 4-wheel Anti-Lock Brake System was available as an option in Japan and Europe. Base model Accords rode on 13-inch steel wheels with wheelcovers with more expensive models having the option of 14-inch alloy wheels.

The Accord's available engines varied depending on its market: Japan received the A18A, A20A, B18A, B20A and A20A3 (US imported cars); Europe received the A16A1, A20A1, A20A2, A20A3, A20A4, B20A2, and B20A8; Australia and New Zealand received A20A2 and A20A4; other regions received A20A2 and/or A16A1; while United States and Taiwan (US imported cars) received the A20A1 and A20A3; Canada received A20A2 and A20A4 in 1987, A20A1 and A20A3 since 1988. On Accord 1986 model year engine block was marked as BS and BT in the United States, BS1 and BT1 in Canada, these cars had chassis code BA. Since 1987 the engine block in Indonesia was marked as NA instead of A20A2. The engine block in Thailand was marked as A.

The Accord's trim levels ranged from spartan to luxurious. In the Japanese home market, the Accord was available with a full power package, heated mirrors (optional), a digital instrument cluster (optional), sunroof (optional), cruise control, and climate control (which was also optional). Some North European export models also had heated front seats and headlight washers. North American and Australian Accords were not available with many of these options, particularly in the US because Honda was seen as a builder of economy cars, and to not cannibalise sales from the recently introduced (1986) Acura line.

Throughout the different markets, in addition to the sedan model, the Accord was available with different body styles which included a three-door hatchback, a three-door shooting-brake called Accord AeroDeck, and a two-door coupe which was added in 1987 for the 1988 model year. The coupe, which was built exclusively in Honda's Marysville, Ohio factory, was "reverse exported" back to Japan where it was known as the US-coupe CA6.

In 1989, the last year of production for the third generation, the SE-i trim returned again to the American market in sedan and coupe models. Standard features in the SE-i included leather-trimmed seats and door panel inserts, alloy wheels, power-assisted four-wheel disc brakes, tinted glass, air conditioning, power steering, power windows, power moonroof (sedan only), dual-outlet exhaust, dual body-coloured power mirrors, and a Bose audio system with steering wheel-mounted controls. Additional standard features included cruise control, fold-down rear seat backs, adjustable steering column, quartz digital clock, remote boot release, rear window defroster and intermittent wipers. Two colour combinations were available for the sedan: Charcoal Granite Metallic with gray leather interior trim or Tuscany Taupe Metallic with beige leather interior trim. For the coupe, two different colour combinations were available: Asturias Gray Metallic with gray leather interior trim and Brittany Blue-Green Metallic with beige leather interior trim.

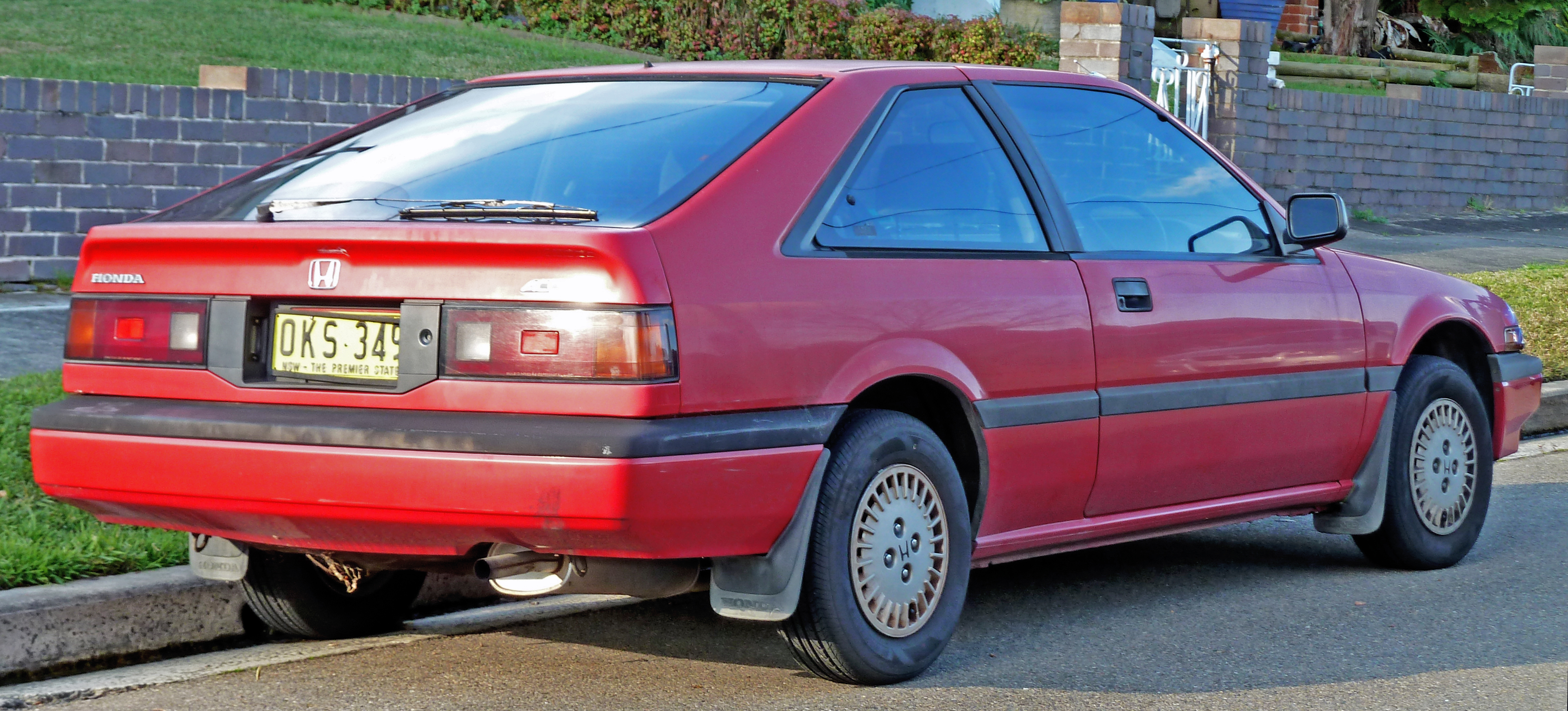
Accord Si hatchback

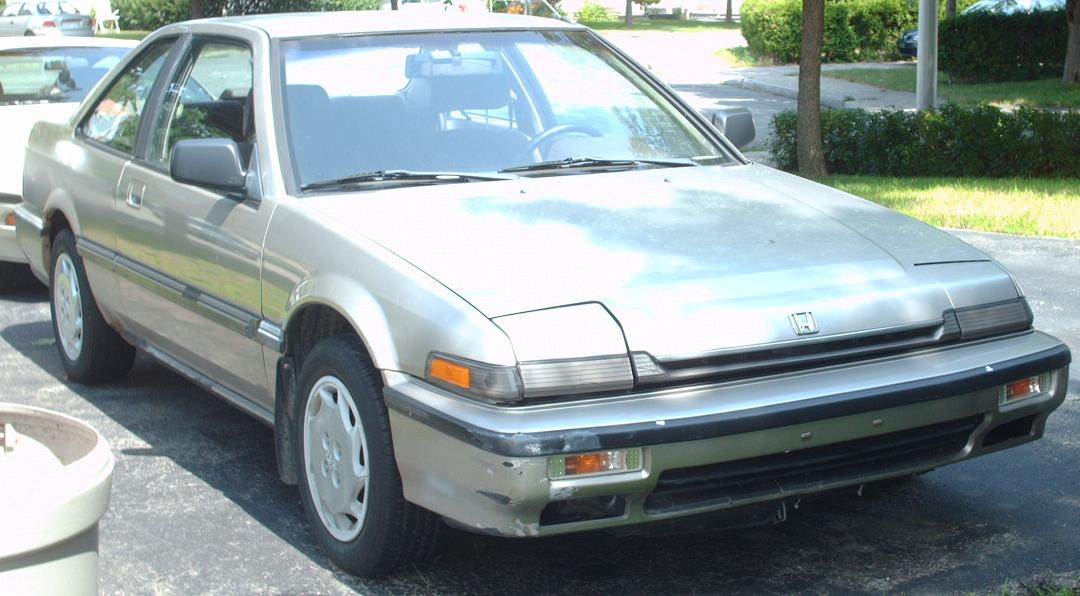
Accord coupe

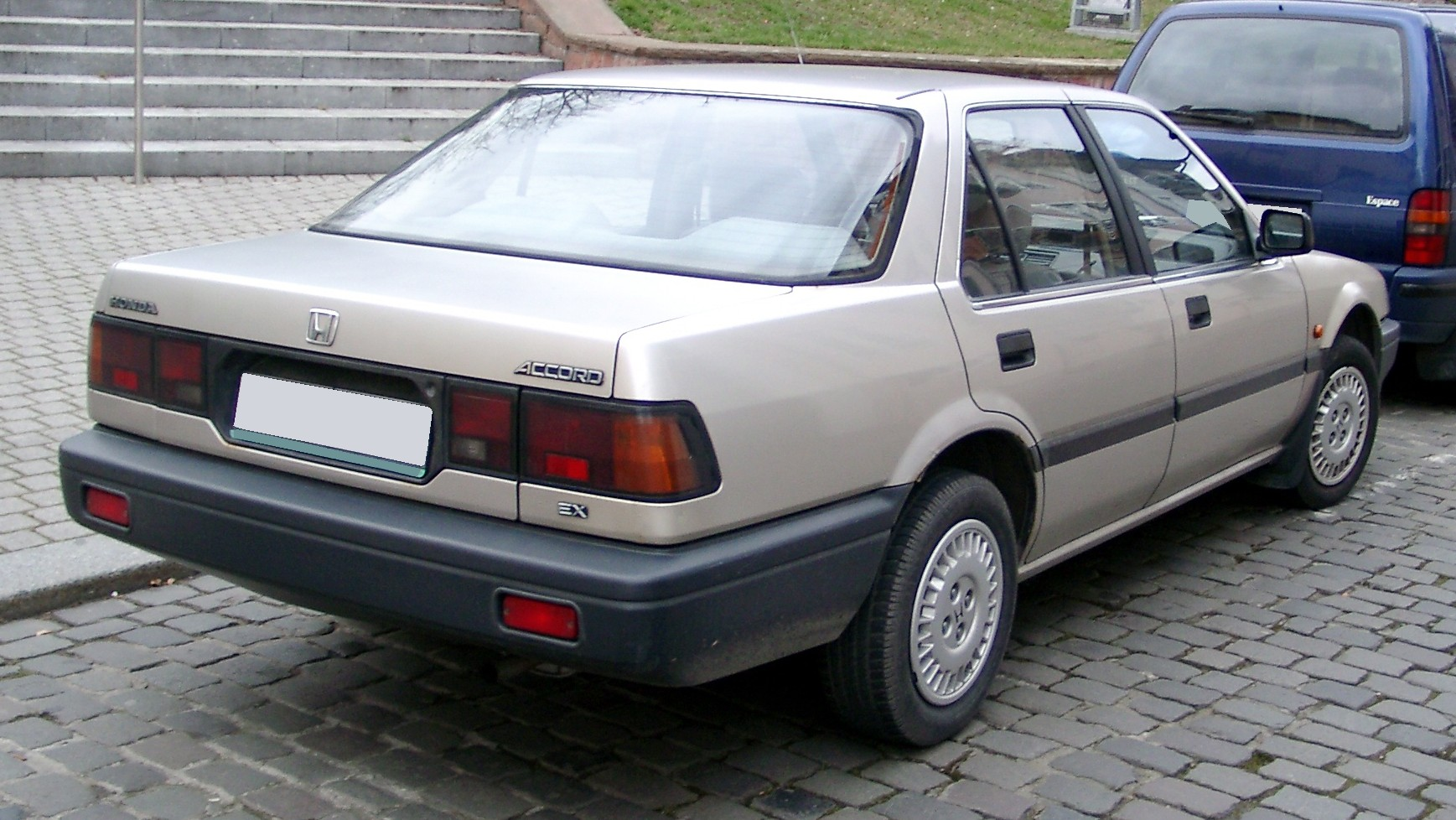
Rear view of Accord EX sedan (Europe)

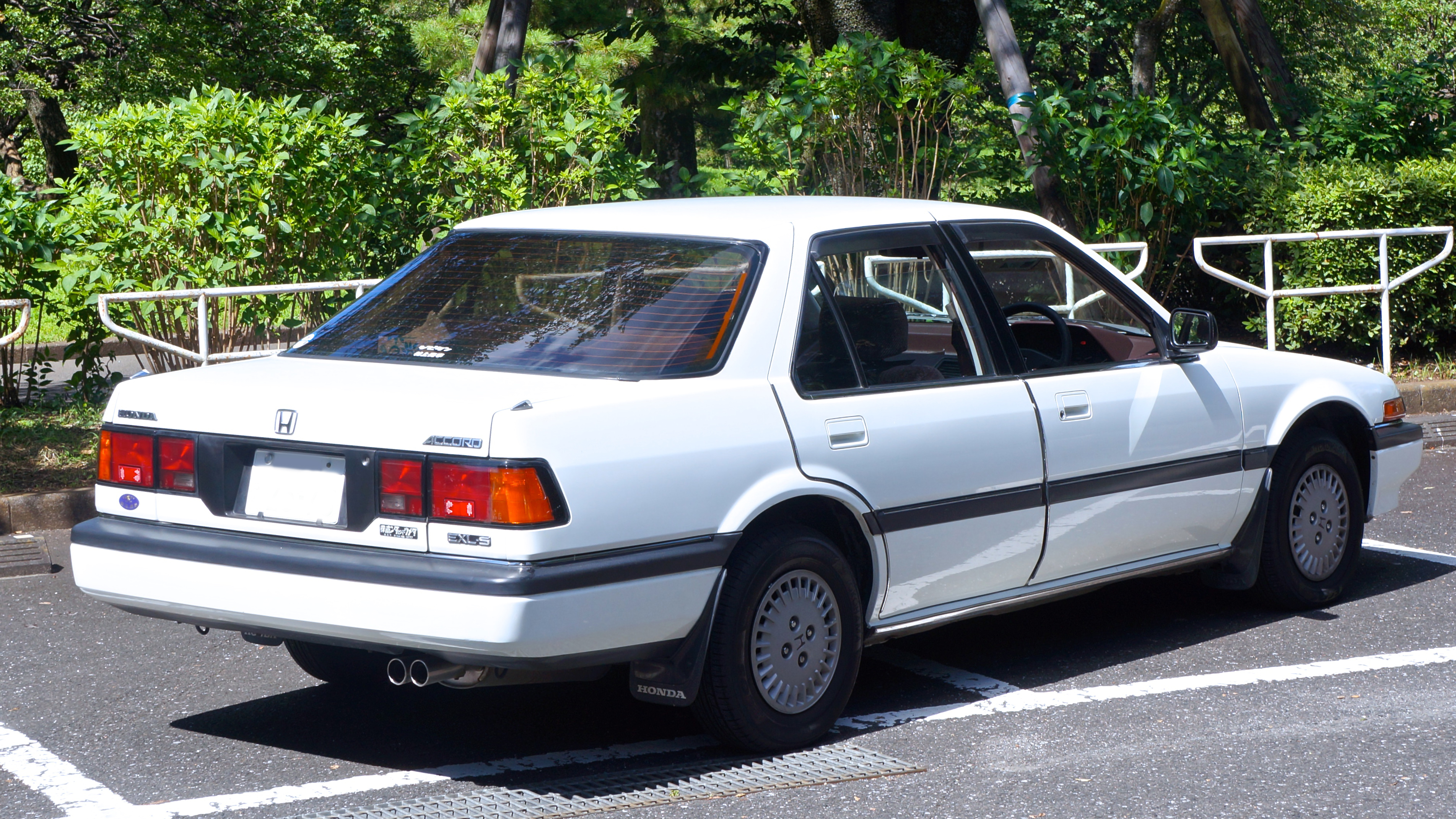
Rear view of Accord EXL-S sedan (Japan)

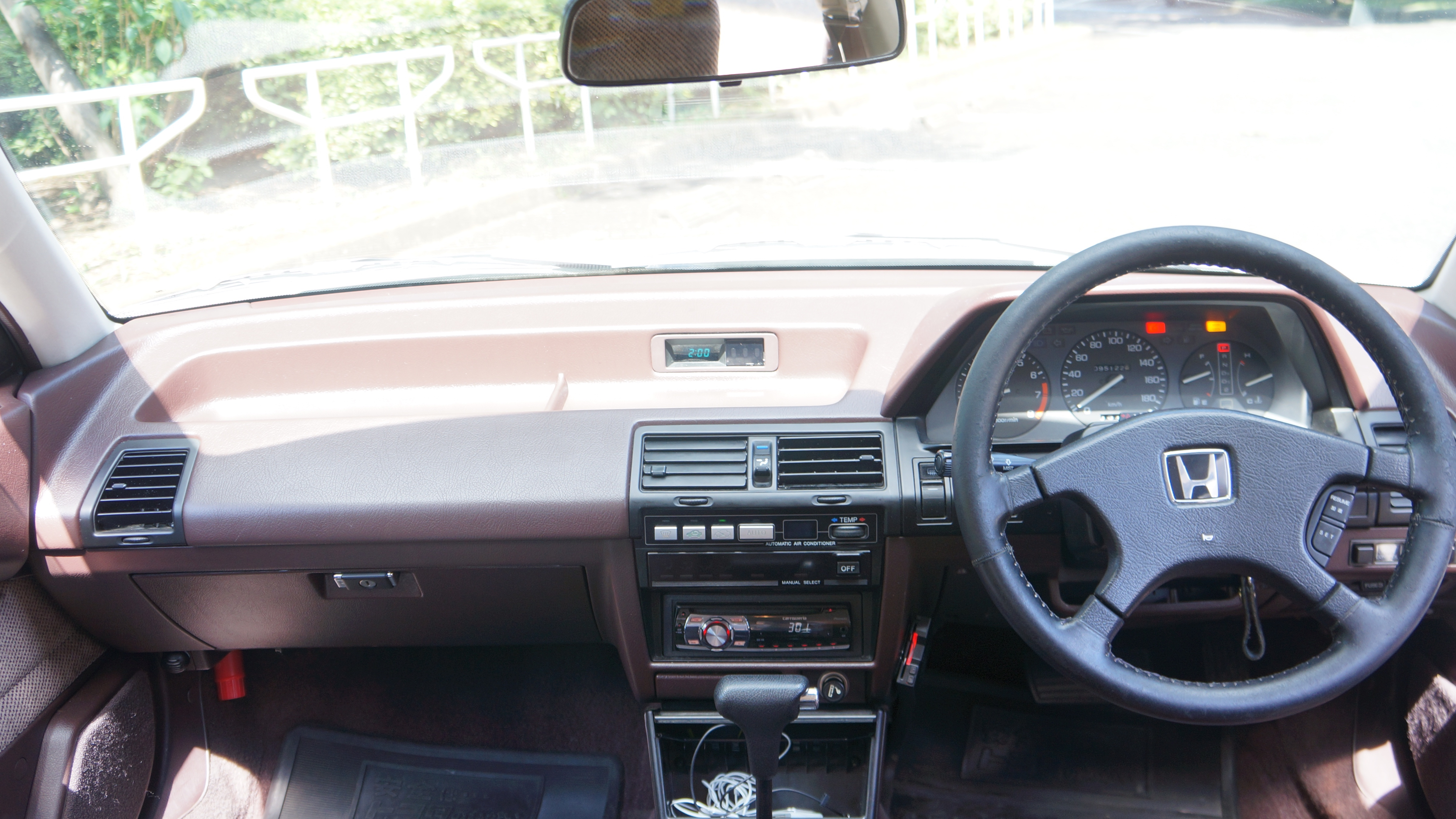
Interior

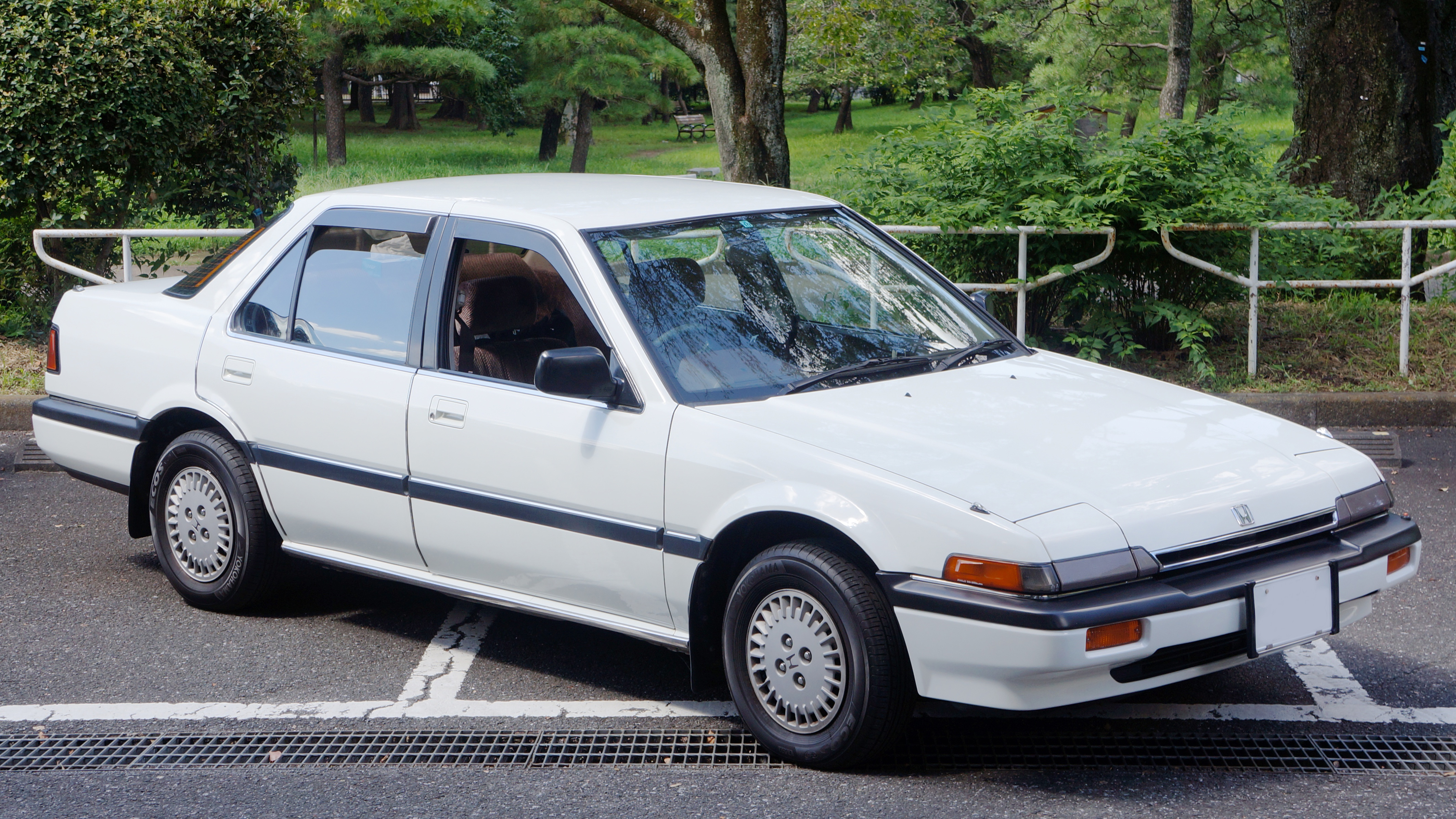
Facelift model Accord sedan

=== Accord AeroDeck ===
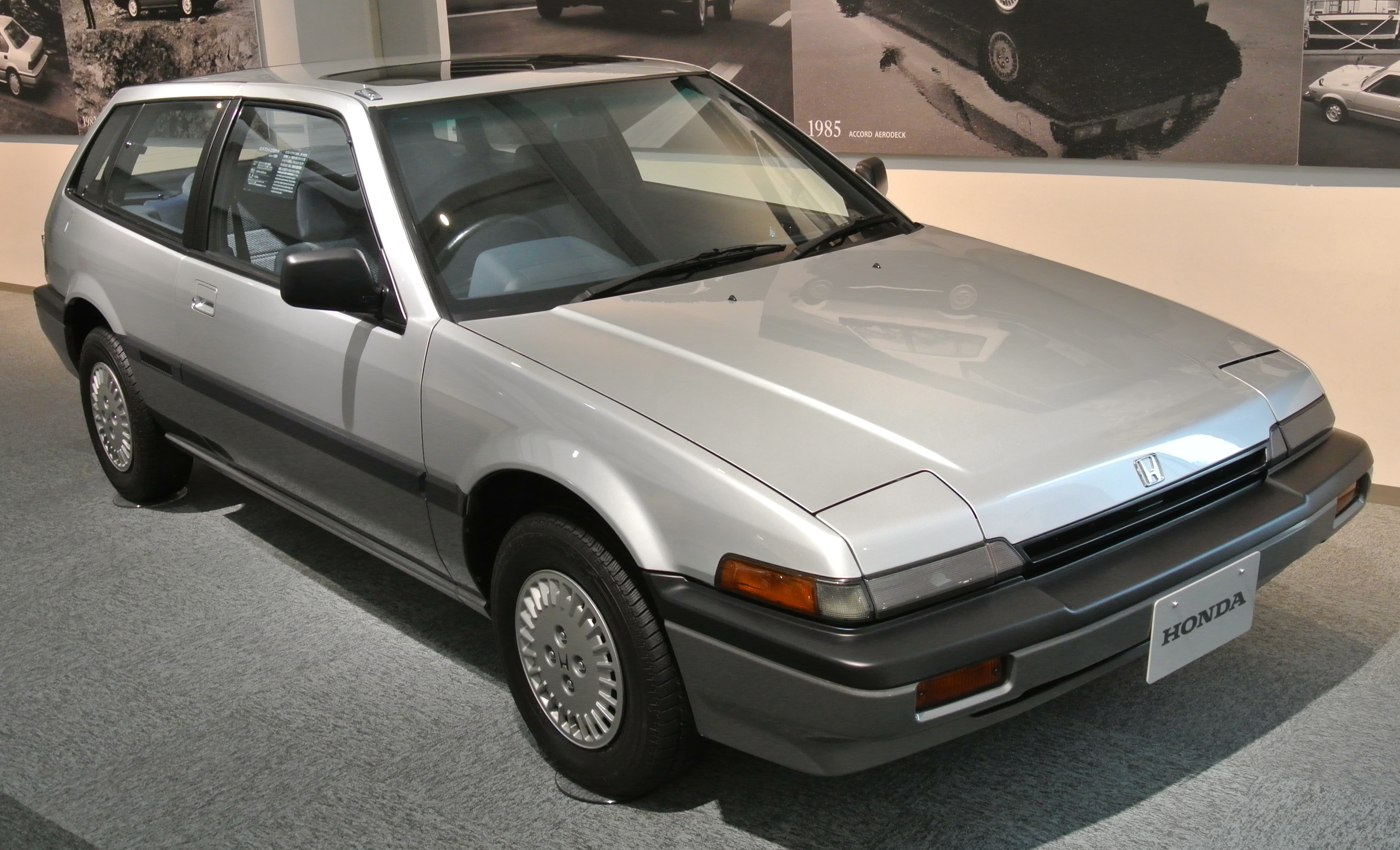
Accord AeroDeck

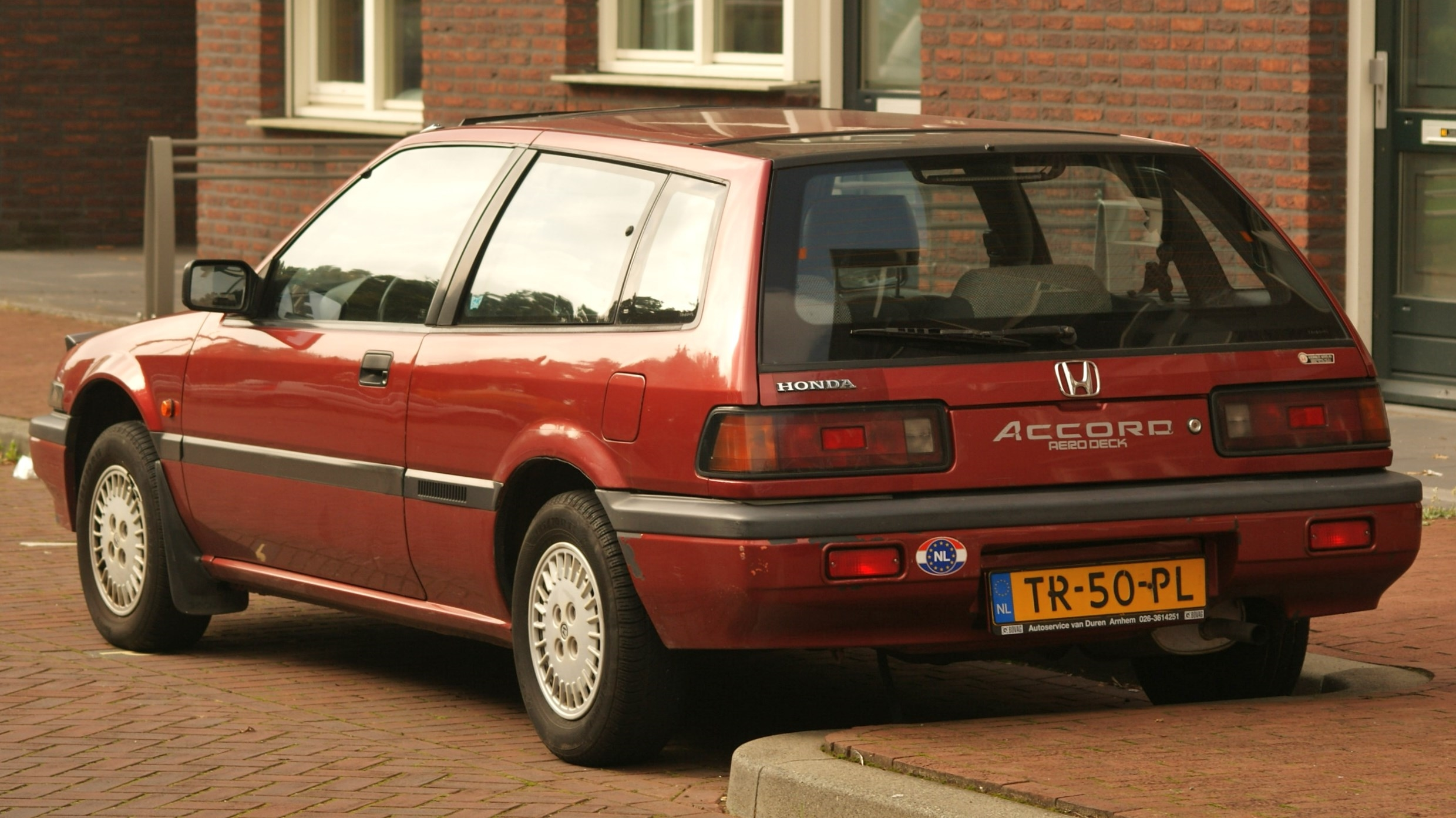
Accord AeroDeck

The third-generation Accord was sold in Japan, Europe, and New Zealand as a three-door hatchback with a flat roof over the rear seats, known in Europe as a shooting-brake. The body style of a flat roof hatchback was also used on the third-generation Honda Civic subcompact, the second-generation Honda City supermini and the first-generation Honda Today kei car. The Honda CR-X was the only three-door hatchback that adopted a fastback, sloping rear hatch "kammback" appearance, demonstrating a performance car appearance identified with Honda Verno products during the mid-1980s.

In North America, the Accord coupe and hatchback models were offered instead. The "AeroDeck" name was reused on the Honda Civic 5-door station wagon, sold in the UK from 1996 to 2000. In parts of Continental Europe, the Accord five-door station wagon was also called the Accord AeroDeck from 1990 until 2008, when the name of the station wagon was renamed the "Accord Tourer". The AeroDeck was only available in Japan at Honda Clio dealerships as a variation of the Accord.

The cargo handling abilities of the AeroDeck were ceded to the fourth-generation Accord station wagon in 1990. The AeroDeck was unique to the Accord model line, as the AeroDeck was not available as a Honda Vigor, as the Accord and Vigor were mechanically identical. The AeroDeck returned an aerodynamic value of .34, and the 2,600 mm (102.4 in) wheelbase returned a spacious interior for both front and rear passengers, on par with a mid-size sedan. Unfortunately, the appearance was not well received in Japan, as the introduction of the Accord Coupe was more well-liked. The appearance was more popular in the United Kingdom.

The AeroDeck was equipped with a four-wheel double wishbone suspension, which gave both a comfortable ride and cornering performance. In addition, speed-sensitive power steering is included, which gives the car easy turning assistance at speeds below 40 kilometres per hour (25 mph) during operation, such as parallel parking. Note that the top model in Japan "2.0Si" is to 4w-ALB (4-wheel ABS) is standard equipment (with an option to upgrade in other trim packages).

Visibility from the driver's seat and the passenger seat was better due to the lower instrument panel design of the front window and a large windscreen. And switches are arranged efficiently and at the time was the driving position can be fine-tuned adjustments.

Because of the shape of the vehicle and the flat roof that continued to the rear of the vehicle, opening the rear hatch had some drawbacks in low clearance environments. The lower part of the hatch was not like one used on the station wagon that went all the way down to the rear bumper, so loading cargo into the back wasn't as convenient as a conventional station wagon with a one-piece hatchback. The rear hatch also wrapped into the rear roof, similar to a gull wing door so that the rear glass was in two pieces, one for the back window, and another part on the rear roof. When open, the hatch rose above the roof at a right angle, providing additional overhead clearance when the hatch was open.

Moreover, because of the emphasis on aiding rear-seat passenger entry, a longer front door was installed, and because power windows were not installed on the lower trim packages "LX", "LX-S" and as such, the window regulator opening felt heavy.

=== Chassis code configurations ===
CODE		ENGINE CODE	REGION(S)
-	CA1	A18A	Japan
-	CA2	B18A	Japan
-	CA3	B20A	Japan
JHM	CA4	A16A1	Europe, Turkey, Pakistan, Singapore and some others
JHM/1HG	BA^{'86}	BS/BT	USA
JHM/1HG	BA^{'86}	BS1/BT1	Canada
JHM	CA5^{'87+}	A20A1/A20A3	USA, Canada
1HG	CA5^{'87+}	A20A1/A20A3	USA, Canada^{'89}
1HG	CA5^{'87+}	A20A1/A20A3	Taiwan (US import)
2HG^{'87-'88}	CA5^{'87+}	A20A1/A20A3	USA^{'88}, Canada
-	CA5^{'87.05+}	A20A	Japan
-	CA5	A20A2	Malaysia
JHM	CA5	A20A1/A20A2/A20A3^{'87+}/A20A4/B20A2^{'87+}/B20A8^{'88+}	Europe
JHM	CA5	A20A2/A20A4^{'87+}	Australia
JHM	CA5	A20A4	New Zealand (Aerodeck only)
JHM	CA5	A20A2	other
1HG	CA6^{'88+}	A20A1/A20A3	USA, Canada
-	CA6^{'88.04+}	A20A3	Japan (US import)
-	SE3	A20A2^{'86}/NA^{'87+}	Indonesia
-	AC	A	Thailand
-	different	A20A2/A20A4^{'87.10+}	New Zealand (except Aerodeck)

== Fourth generation (1990) ==
Fourth generation
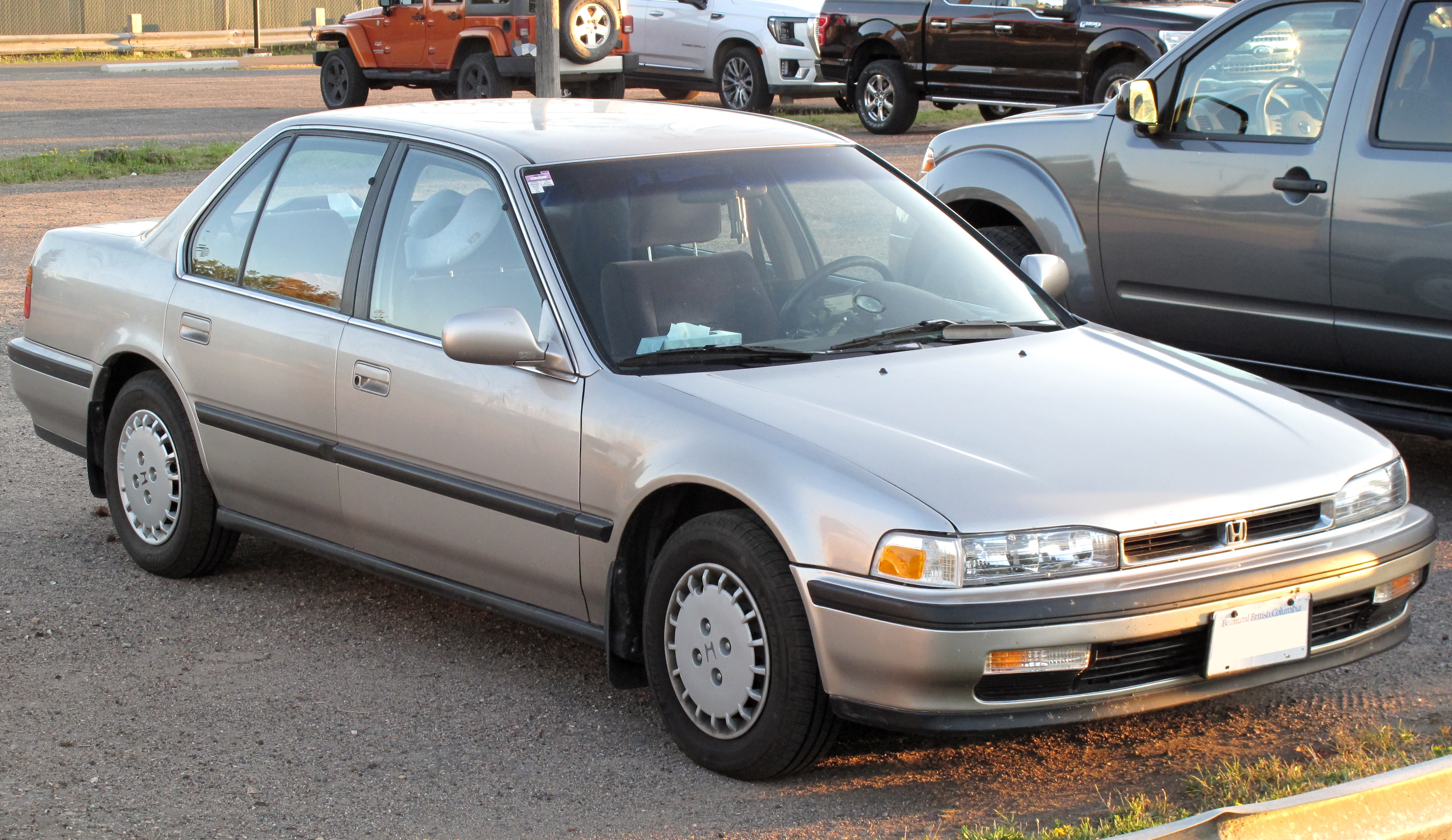
- 1991 Accord EX sedan (pre-facelift, Canada)

Overview
- Model code: CB7/9
- Also called: Yangcheng YCZ7130M (China; JV)
- Production: 14 September 1989 – August 1993
- Model years: 1990–1993
- Assembly: Marysville, Ohio, United States (Marysville Auto Plant); Sayama, Japan; Hsinchu, Taiwan; Nelson, New Zealand (Honda New Zealand); East Liberty, Ohio, United States (East Liberty Auto Plant); North Jakarta, Indonesia (PT. Prospect Motor); Johor Bahru, Malaysia (OASB); Ayuthaya, Thailand (Honda Cars (Thailand) Co.); Guangzhou, Guangdong, China (1992–1993)
- Designer: Toshihiko Shimizu (1987)

Body and chassis
- Class: Mid-size car
- Body style: 2-door coupé; 4-door sedan; 5-door station wagon
- Related: Honda Ascot; Honda Ascot Innova; Honda Inspire; Honda Vigor; Rover 600

Powertrain
- Engine: 1.8 L F18A I4; 2.0 L F20A I4; 2.0 L F20A DOHC I4; 2.2 L F22A I4
- Transmission: 4-speed automatic; 5-speed manual

Dimensions
- Wheelbase: 2,720 mm (107.1 in)
- Length: 1989–91 Coupe & Sedan: 4,694 mm (184.8 in); 1991 Wagon: 4,724 mm (186.0 in); 1991–93 Coupe & Sedan: 4,704 mm (185.2 in); 1991–93 Wagon: 4,745 mm (186.8 in); 4,680 mm (184 in) Sedan & Wagon (Japan only, all years)
- Width: 1989–91: 1,725 mm (67.9 in); 1991–93 Coupe & Sedan: 1,704 mm (67.1 in); Wagon: 1,725 mm (68 in); 1,695 mm (67 in) (all bodystyles in Japan)
- Height: 1989–91 Coupe: 1,369 mm (53.9 in); 1989–91 Sedan: 1,389 mm (54.7 in); 1991 Wagon: 1,400 mm (55.1 in); 1991–93 Coupe: 1,326 mm (52.2 in); 1991–93 Wagon: 1,351 mm (53.2 in); 1991–93 Sedan: 1,341 mm (52.8 in)
- Curb weight: 1,237 kg (2,728 lb)

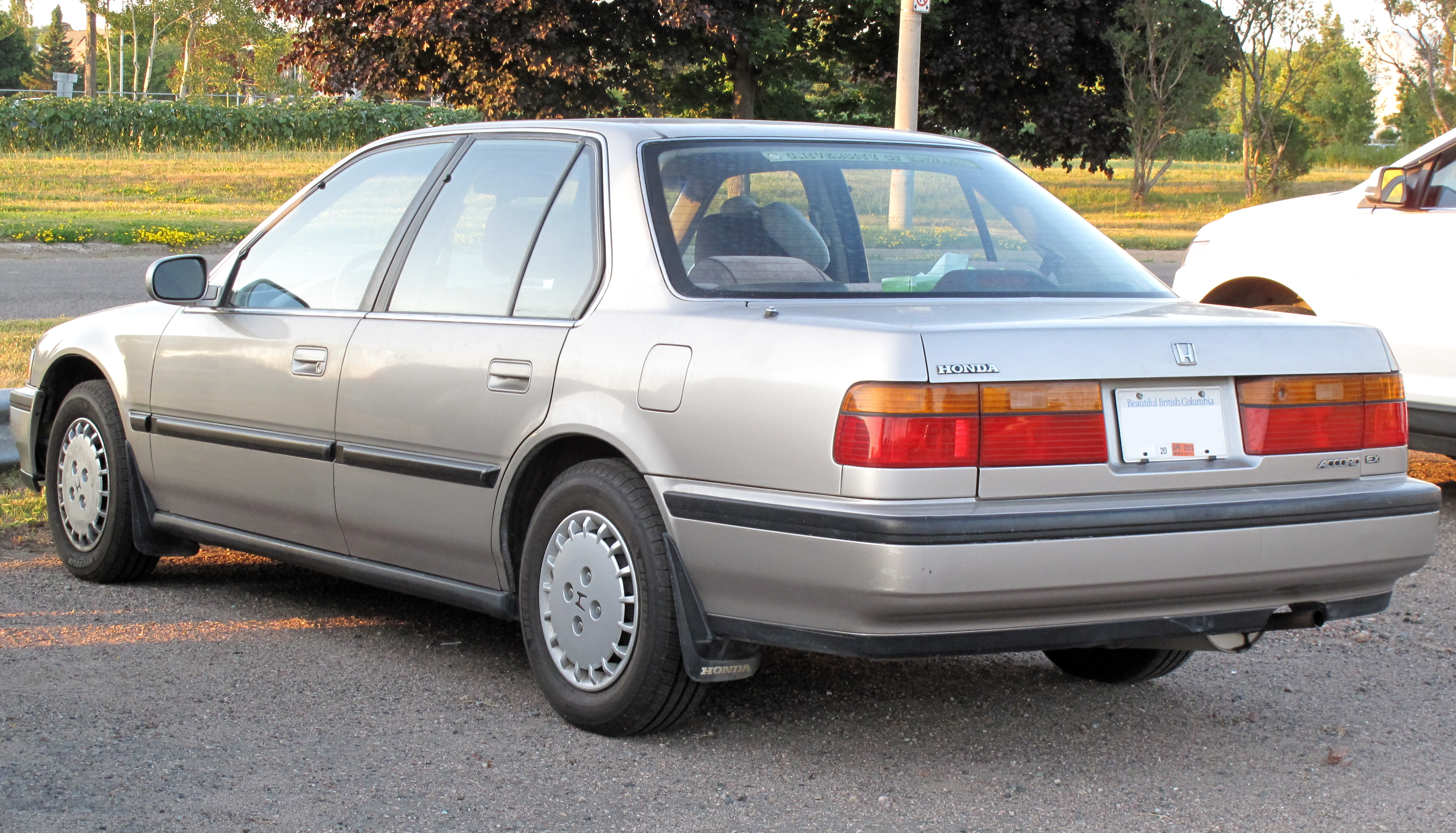
1991 Accord EX sedan (pre-facelift, Canada)

The fourth-generation Accord, introduced on the "CB" chassis, was unveiled in 1989 for the 1990 model year. Although much larger than its predecessor, the sedan's styling was evolutionary, featuring the same low-slung design and wraparound rear window as the third-generation. For the first time, a three-door hatchback was no longer available internationally.

This was one of the first U.S. production cars to feature optic reflectors with completely clear lenses on the headlamps. The styling reflected influences from the flagship Legend (sold in North America as an Acura), as Japanese Accords were now sold at Honda Clio dealerships, where the Legend and the Inspire were sold. The growing popularity of the Accord internationally was evident in the ever-increasing dimensions, which now matched almost exactly with the first-generation Legend introduced in 1985.

For the fourth-generation model, Honda made significant engineering design improvements. All cars sold in North America came with a completely new all-aluminum 2.2-litre 16-valve electronic fuel-injected engine as standard, replacing the previous 2.0-litre 12-valve unit from the past generation. Cars equipped with automatic transmissions used an electronically controlled rear engine mount to reduce low-frequency noise and vibration. The mount contained two fluid-filled chambers separated by a computer-controlled valve. At low engine speeds, fluid is routed through the valve damping vibration. Above 850 rpm, fluid is routed around the valve making the engine mount stiffer.

In the U.S., the LX-i and SE-i designations were dropped, being replaced with the DX, LX, and EX trim levels. The Canadian trim levels varied slightly from the U.S. models with LX, EX, and EX-R roughly corresponding to the American DX, LX, and EX, respectively. Fourth-generation Japanese-assembled cars sold in Australia offered the same 4-wheel steering technology as was available optionally on the US market Prelude, but was not included on the New Zealand-assembled versions. The four-wheel steering system was also available on the Accord's Japanese platform-mate, called the Ascot FTBi. US Accord Coupes were available in the same DX, LX and EX trims as the US Accord Saloon (LX, EX, and EX-R in Canada).

A 125 hp (93 kW; 127 PS) four-cylinder engine was offered in the DX and LX models (F22A1), while the 1990 and 1991 model year EX received a 130 hp (97 kW; 132 PS) version (F22A4). Cruise control was dropped from the DX sedan, with air conditioning remaining a dealer-installed option. The LX kept the same features as the previous generation including air conditioning, power windows, door locks, and mirrors. The 1991 EX had an increase of 5 hp due to a different exhaust manifold design, slightly larger exhaust piping, and a twin outlet muffler. 15-inch machined aluminum-alloy wheels, sunroof, upgraded upholstery, rear stabiliser bar, and a high-power four-speaker stereo cassette were standard on all EX models. Some models were special ordered with an anti-lock braking system (at that time abbreviated as ALB, now all automakers refer to it as ABS). A redesigned manual transmission with a hydraulic clutch was standard equipment in all trims while an all-new electronically controlled four-speed automatic transmission was optional for all models.

Some new dealer-installed accessories were now offered including a single-disc in-dash CD player or boot-mounted six-disc CD changer, stereo equaliser, fog lights, security system, rear wing spoiler, boot lip spoiler, luggage rack, full and half nose mask, center armrest, window visors, sunroof visor, car cover, and a cockpit cover.

Because of tightening auto safety regulations from the NHTSA, all 1990 and 1991 model year Accords sold in the United States came equipped with motorised shoulder belts for front passengers to comply with passive restraint mandates. These semi-automatic restraints were a two-component system; a motorised shoulder belt along with a non-integrated and manually operated seatbelt. The shoulder belts automatically raced around each window frame encircling both the driver and front-seat passenger whenever the front door closed. The process reversed to release them when opened. The lap belts, however, still required manual fastening.

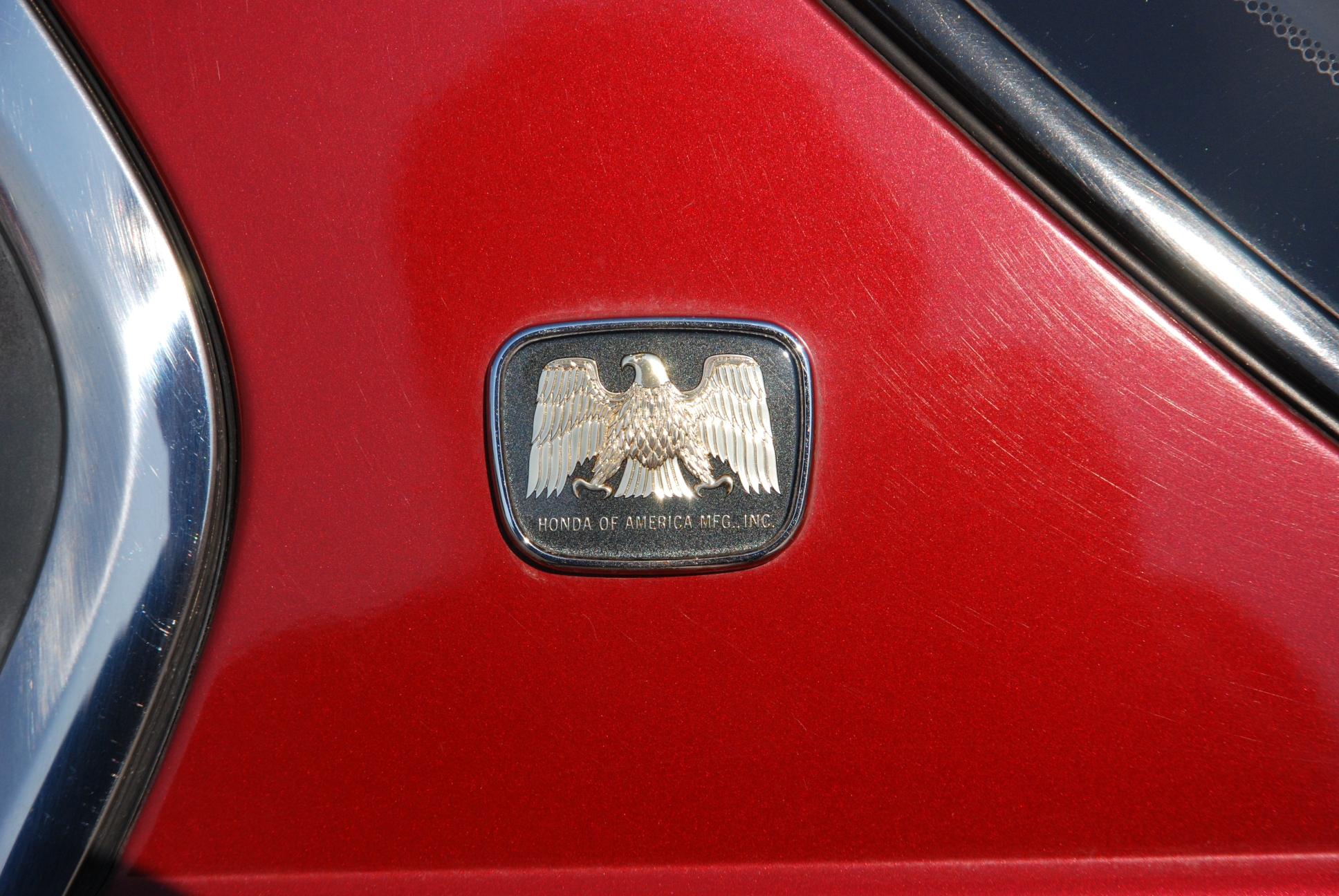
Honda of America badge, installed on the C-pillar of exported coupés

In early 1990 for the 1991 model year, Honda unveiled the Accord wagon, to be manufactured at the Marysville, Ohio plant. Production began in late November, 1990. The Ohio plant exported right-hand drive wagons and coupes to Europe and Japan. In Europe, the station wagon was called the "Aerodeck" in reference to the 1985–1989 three-door vehicle. All station wagons sold outside the United States were affixed with a small badge on the "C" pillar denoting the vehicle was built at the Ohio facility. European and Japanese vehicles had options not available within the U.S. including automatic climate control systems, power seats, and several other minor features. The Accord Wagons were available from November 1990, only in LX and EX trim in North America or simply as the 2.2i in Japan. They had larger front brakes to compensate for the added weight and unlike other U.S. Accords, including a driver's side airbag as standard equipment. Other than a retractable tonneau cover in the rear cargo area and keyless entry on EX models, the wagons were equipped the same as their coupé and sedan counterparts. Due to the large, 2.2-litre engine and wider side trim which brought up the width of the car to 1,725 mm (67.9 in), the Accord Wagon slotted into a larger size class in Japan, attracting considerably higher road taxes and other fees than the Japanese-made sedans.

=== Return of the SE (1991) ===
Honda reintroduced the SE (previously SE-i) sedan for 1991. It returned to the lineup without the traditional Bose high-powered audio system but with an AM/FM stereo cassette 4x20 watt EX audio system; leather-trimmed steering wheel, leather seats and door panels, a fuel-injected 140 hp (104 kW) engine, four-speed automatic transmission, and four-wheel disc brakes w/ ABS as standard equipment. For the first time, a manual transmission was not offered in the SE. Two colours were available: Solaris Silver Metallic with Graphite Black interior and Brittany Blue Metallic with Ivory interior. Unlike previous editions, the 1991 SE was not equipped with uniquely styled alloy wheels but instead carried the EX model wheels.

=== Facelift (1991) ===
Accords received a minor facelift in 1991 for the 1992 model year. The SE trim was dropped again but left behind its 140 hp (104 kW) F22A6 engine for use in the EX models. This engine added 15 hp over the DX and LX trims and 10 hp over the 90–91 EX trim due to a further revised exhaust system. The system used the same EX-SE twin-outlet muffler, a revised air intake tract, a revised camshaft, and a revised intake manifold using IAB butterfly valves which open at 4,600 rpm to increase air intake breathing at high rpm. It was similar in design to the 92–96 Prelude Si and VTEC models. For the 1992 and 1993 model years, the motorised shoulder belt system was replaced with a standard driver-side airbag and conventional shoulder/seatbelt arrangement for all but the center rear passenger. Anti-lock four-wheel disc brakes became standard on the EX. The front and rear fascias received a more rounded and updated look. Coupe and sedan models received a new grille, new headlamps, amber parking lights, slightly thinner body side molding, updated wheel designs and for the first time, the EX coupe used wheels different from the EX sedan. The sedans received restyled shortened taillamps with an inverted amber turn signal and backup light positions. The wagon taillamps though still resembled those from the 1990–1991 Accord. The US-market coupe used the new revised inverted positioning of the signal and backup lights, but the shape of the taillamps still resembled those of the 1990–1991 models. EX trim levels included a radio anti-theft function to deter stereo theft. A front driver's seat armrest was now standard on LX and EX models. Some dealer-installed accessories were dropped including the luggage rack, boot-lip spoiler, and cockpit cover. A gold finish kit was added.

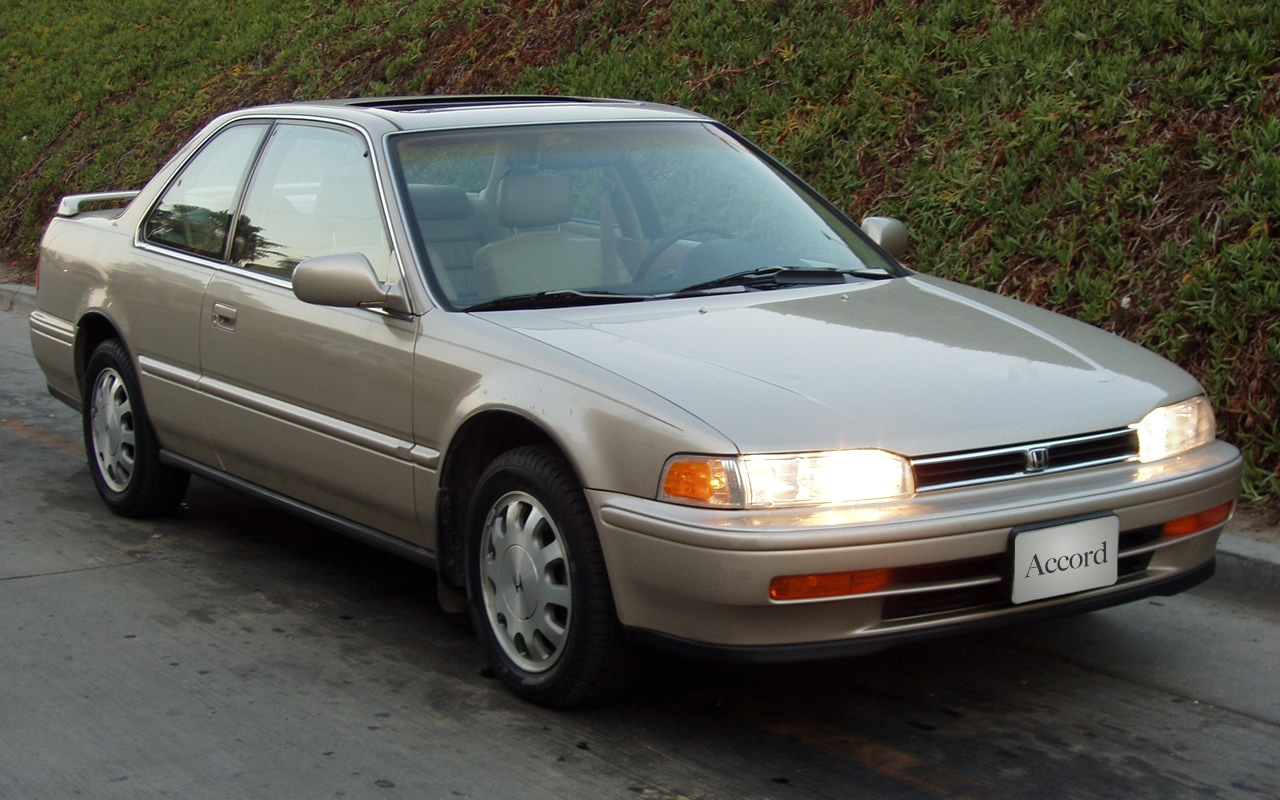
Coupe (1991 facelift)

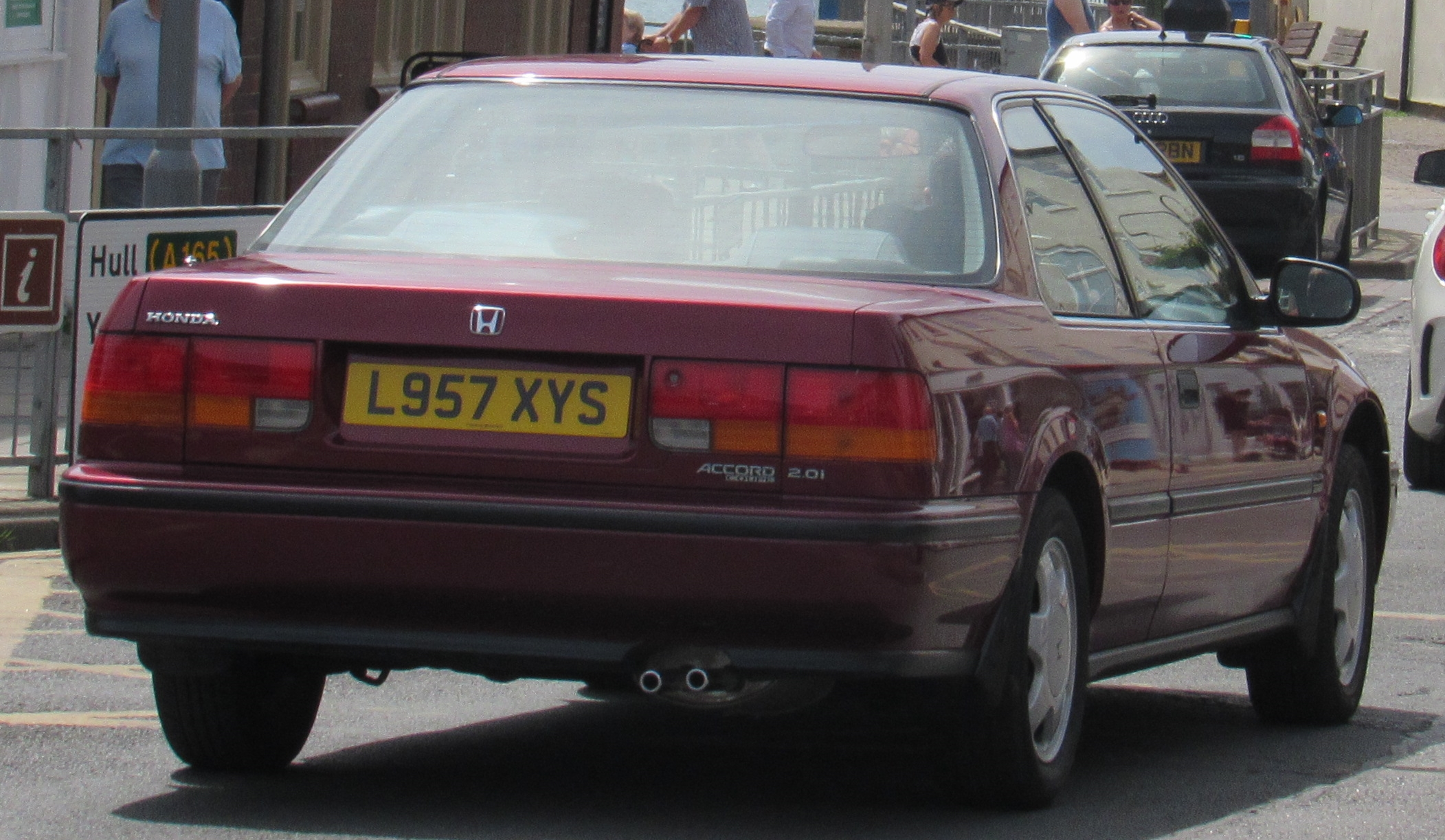
Coupe (1991 facelift)

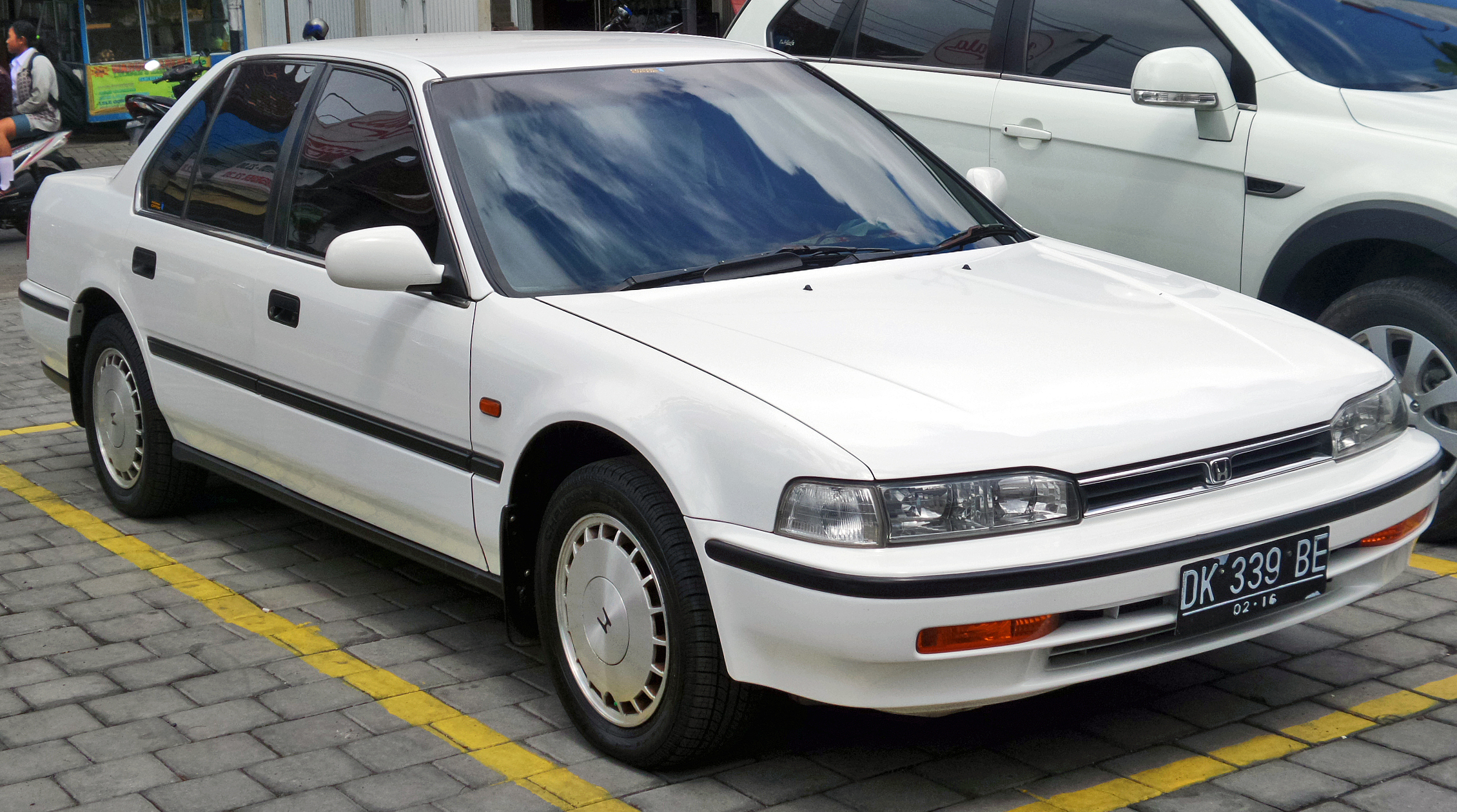
Sedan (1991 facelift; Indonesia)

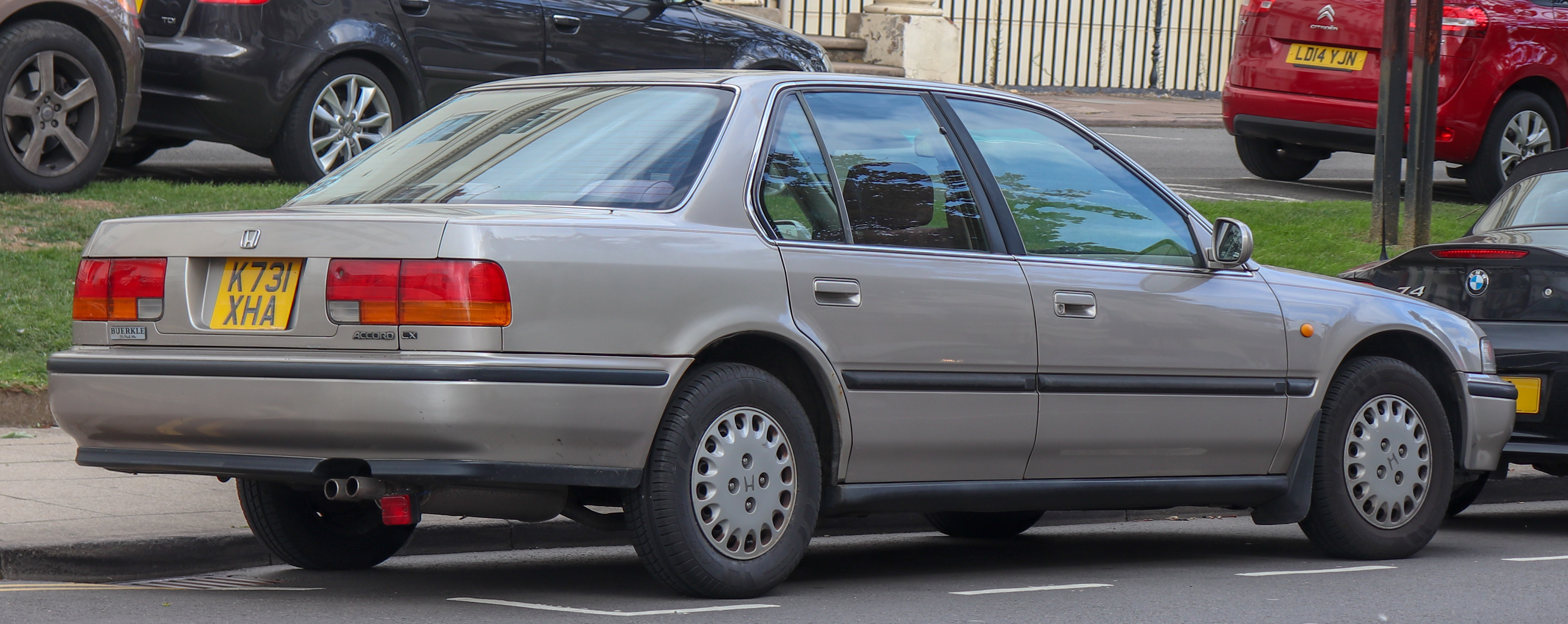
Sedan (1991 facelift)

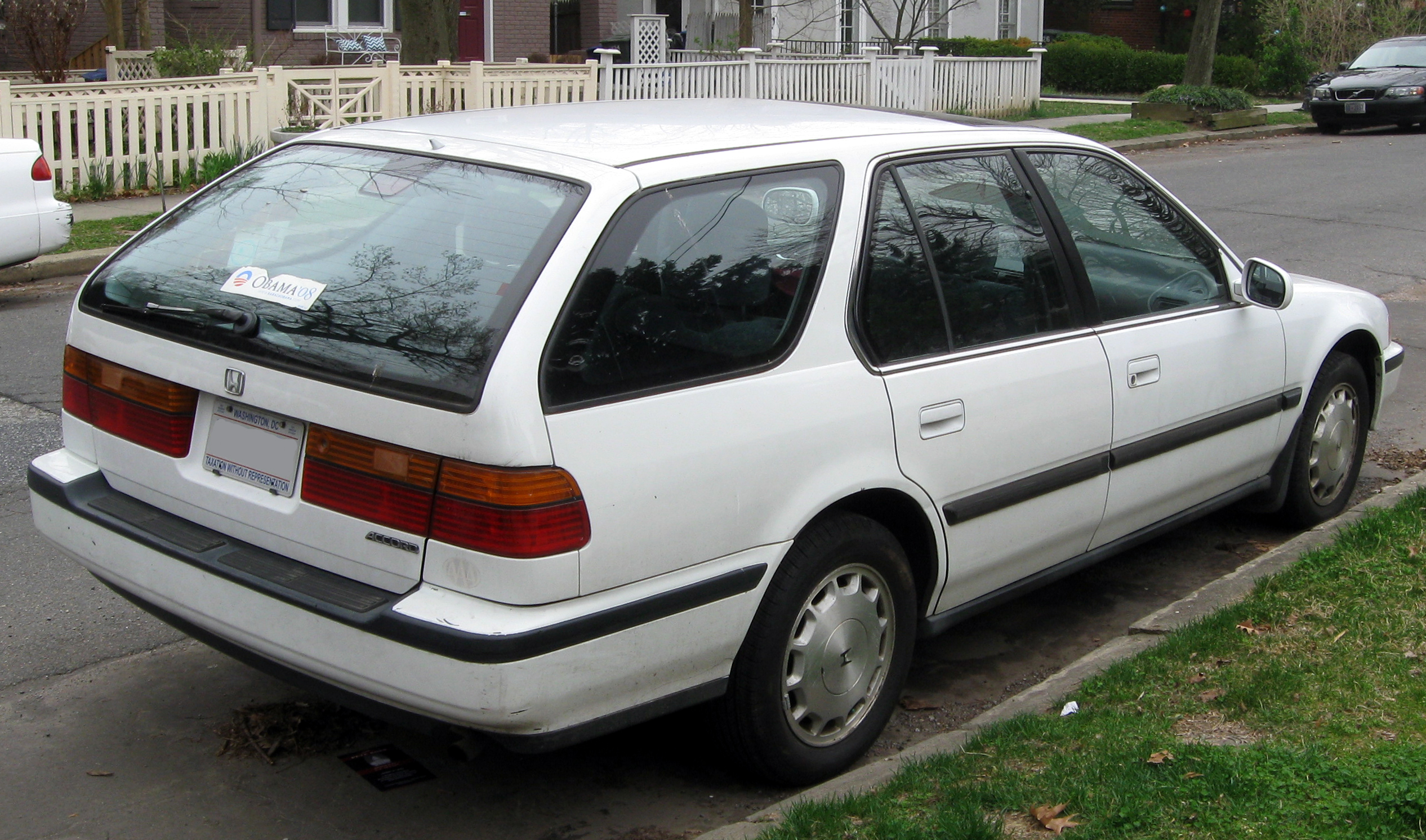
Wagon (1991 facelift)

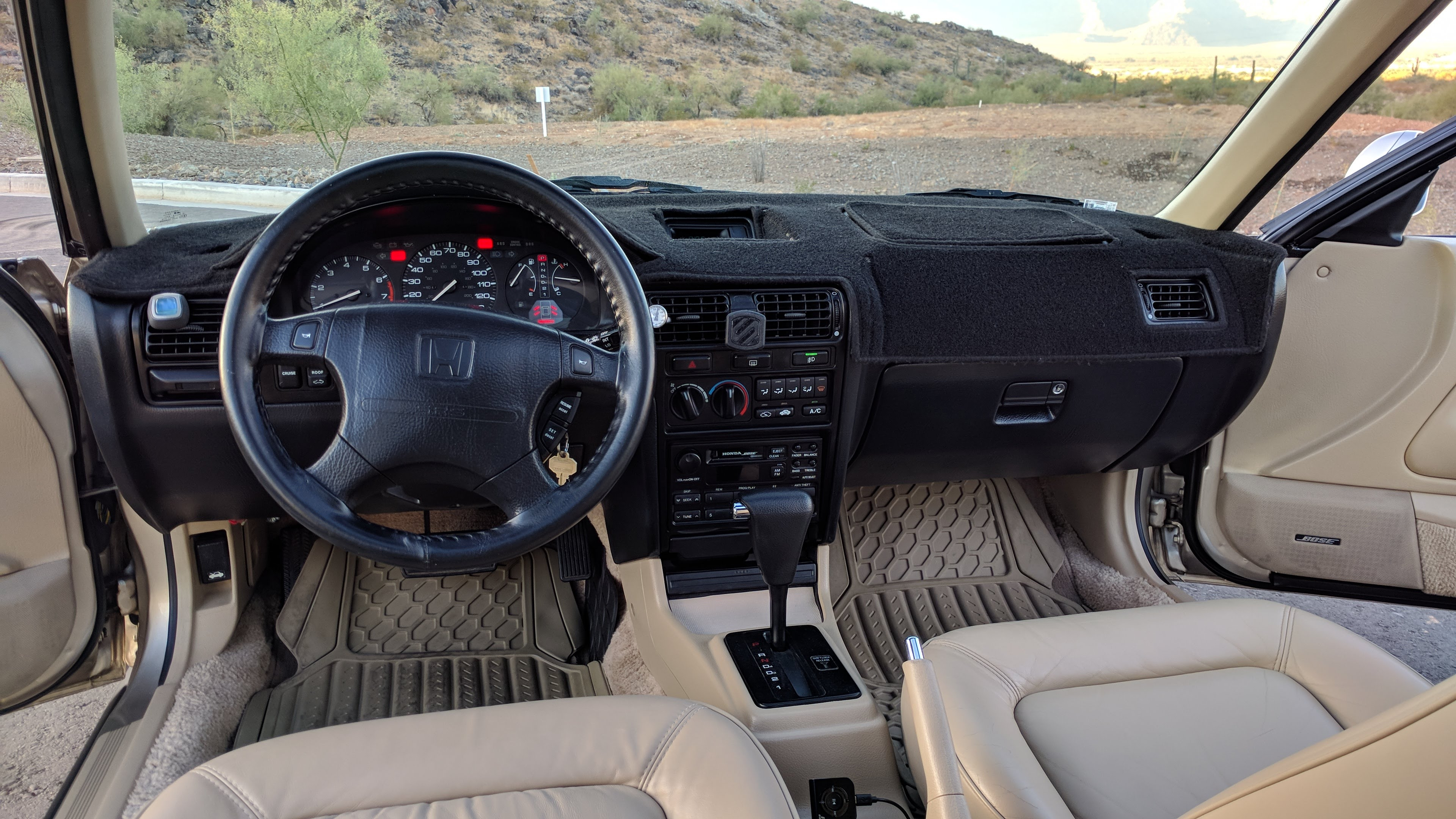
Interior

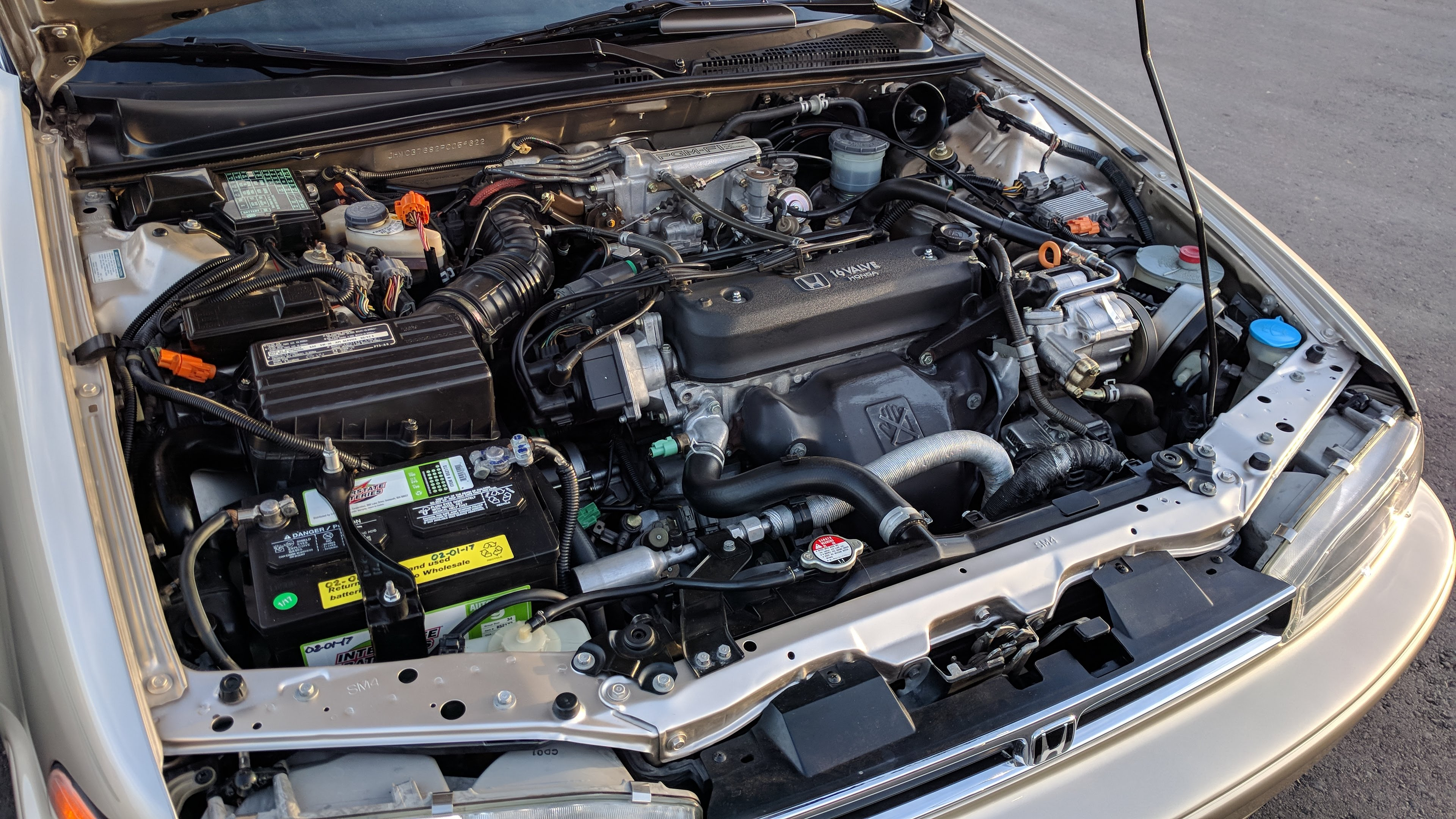
F22A engine

=== 10th Anniversary Edition and return of the SE (1993) ===
In 1992, Honda introduced the tenth Anniversary Edition sedan to commemorate the tenth year of U.S. Accord production. The tenth Anniversary Edition was based on the Accord LX sedan but came equipped with several features not available in the LX trim. The upgrades included ABS, four-wheel disc brakes, 15-inch EX coupe six-spoke alloy wheels, body-coloured side moldings, chin spoiler, and standard automatic transmission. Three colours were offered for the tenth Anniversary Edition: Frost White, Granada Black Pearl, and Arcadia Green Pearl. The tenth Anniversary models also included the same premium seat fabric found in EX models. The Frost White and Arcadia Green cars were paired with the same interior colour as their LX/EX counterparts, Blue and Ivory, respectively. The Granada Black cars were paired with Gray interior, while the Granada Black EX had an Ivory interior.

The SE returned in late 1992 as both a sedan and for the first time since the 1989 SE-i, as a coupe. The SE sedan featured standard dual front airbags; the first Accord to do so. An eight-button, four-speaker Honda-Bose audio system, automatic transmission, leather trim, body-coloured bumper, and body side moldings were standard. The SE coupe included a factory rear wing spoiler which differed slightly in design from the already available dealer-installed accessory rear wing spoiler. In Canada, the SE came with heated front seats and heated side-view mirrors. Both the sedan and coupe received distinctive 15-inch alloy wheels as well. All SE sedans during 1990–1991 (1991 MY) and 1992–1993 (1993 MY) were manufactured in Japan, while all SE coupes were produced in the U.S. The 1993 MY sedan was available in two colours: Cashmere Silver Metallic and Geneva Green Pearl, both with Ivory interior. The coupe was offered with two colours as well: Cashmere Metallic and Atlantis Blue Pearl, both again with Ivory interior. 1993 would be the last year for the SE as an exclusive, high content limited edition Accord model. Later generations would use a "Special Edition" designation rather than the previously used "SE" designation. These models were a combination of an Accord LX with several EX features similar to the 1993 tenth Anniversary Edition LX.

At the end of the model life of the CB Accord, a "pillared hardtop" model called the Honda Ascot Innova was launched in Japan, based on the CB Accord chassis, but with a different, much more modern-styled body, taking cues from the 1992 Honda Prelude.

=== Honda Ascot ===
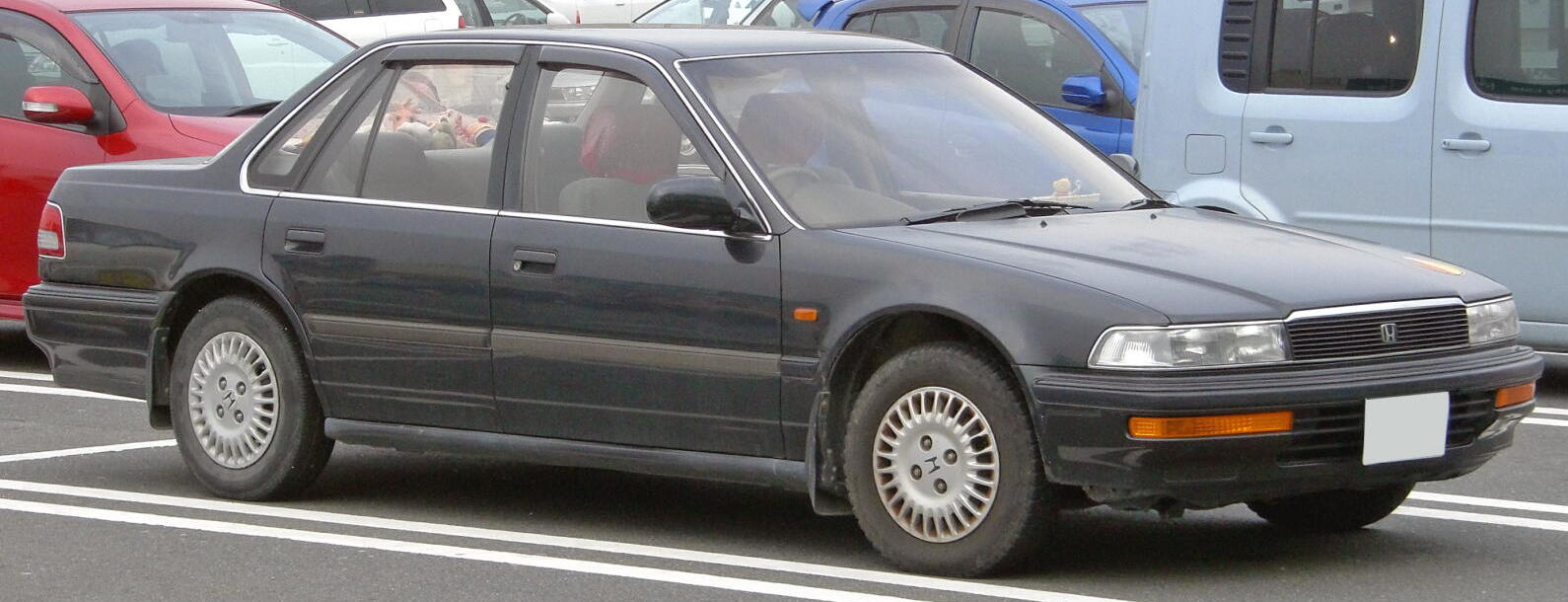
Japan-spec series CB Honda Ascot

The fourth-generation Accord spawned a sister model in 1989, called the Honda Ascot which, while mechanically identical to the Accord, featured unique sedan bodywork, although it bore a resemblance to the Accord. The Ascot was sold through the Honda Primo network in Japan while the Accord was distributed through the Honda Clio network.

=== Honda Vigor and Honda Inspire ===
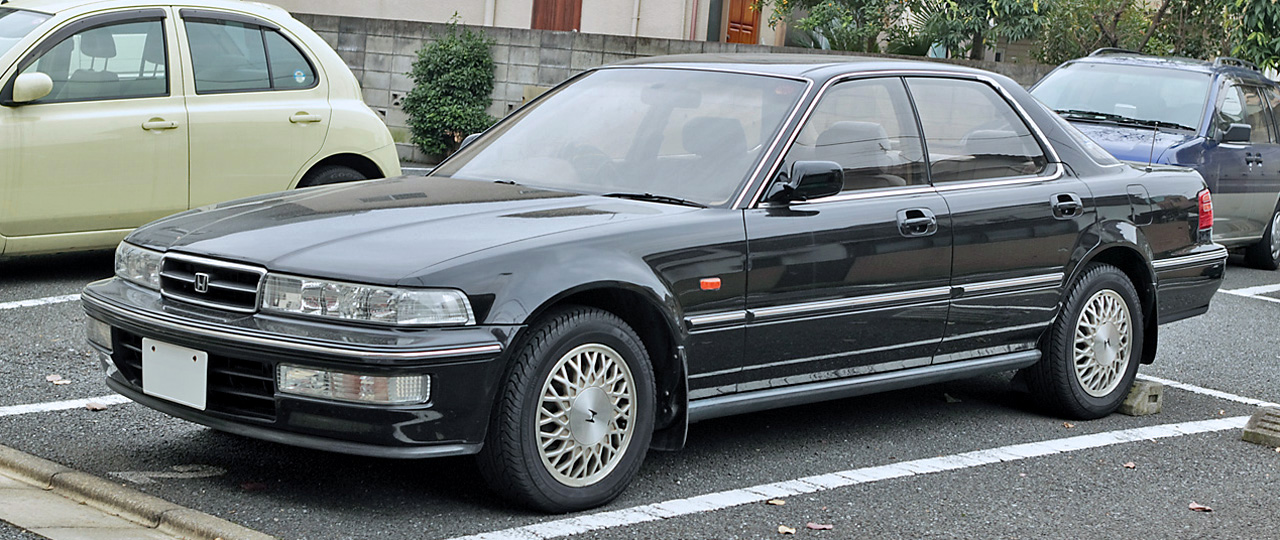
1989 Inspire

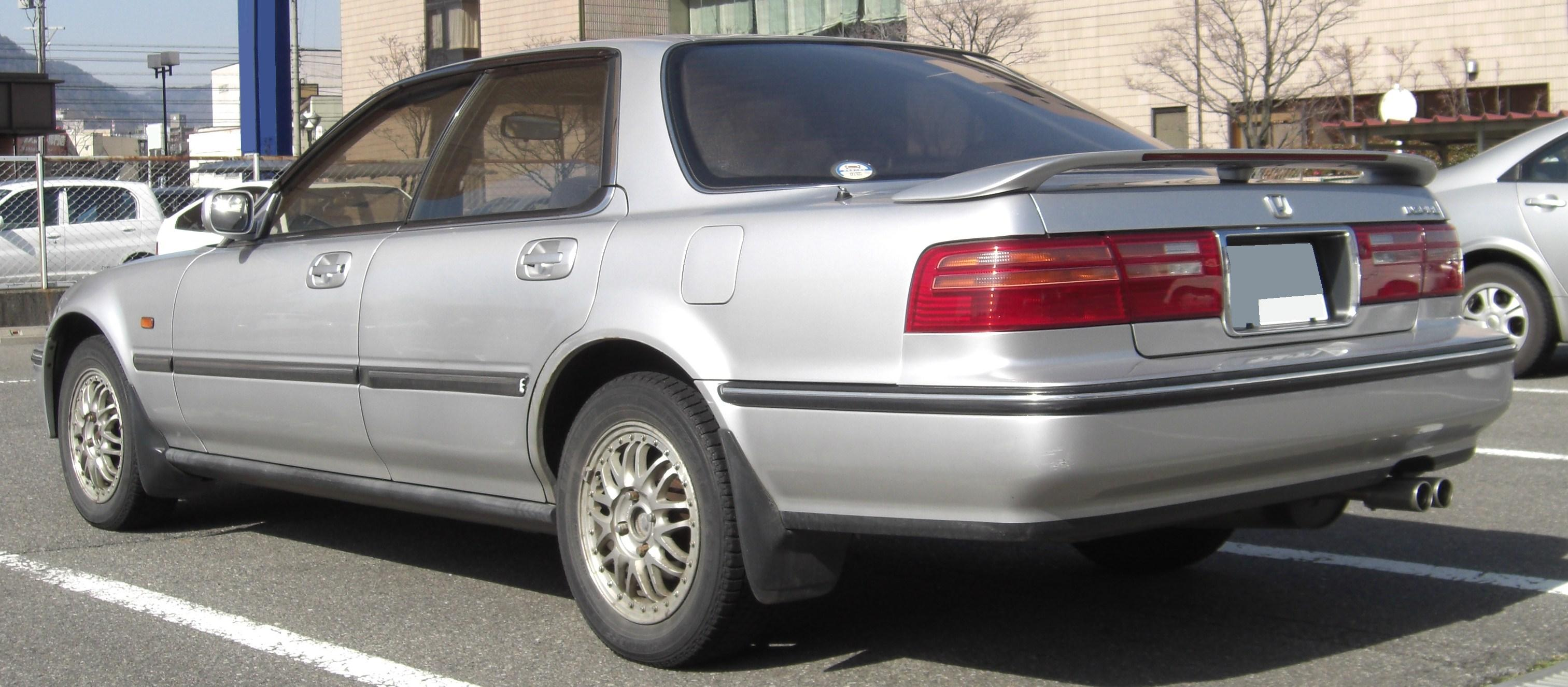
1989 Inspire

Unlike previous generations of the Honda Vigor, which were simply upmarket versions of the Accord, the third generation 'CB5' model was spun off as a model in its own right and was based on a different platform which featured a longitudinal engine layout compared to the transverse set-up of the Accord. A sister model to the Vigor, the Honda Inspire, was also unveiled in 1989 and, bar a different front grille, front and rear lights, and bumpers, sported identical bodywork. The Vigor was available in the United States and Canada under the Acura brand.

== Fifth generation (1993) ==
For the first time in the model's history, Honda developed two distinct versions of the Accord when the fifth-generation model was launched in the fall of 1993; one version for the European market and one for the North American and Japanese market. Honda and the Rover Group created the European Accord and the Rover 600, a reflection of the past success they had with the Honda Legend and the Rover 800. This generation Accord was also sold in Japan as the Isuzu Aska, while some Isuzu products were sold as Honda products there also.

At its introduction in 1993, it won the Car of the Year Japan Award for the second time.

=== North America, Japan and Asia Pacific ===
Fifth generation Japan, North America and Asia-Pacific
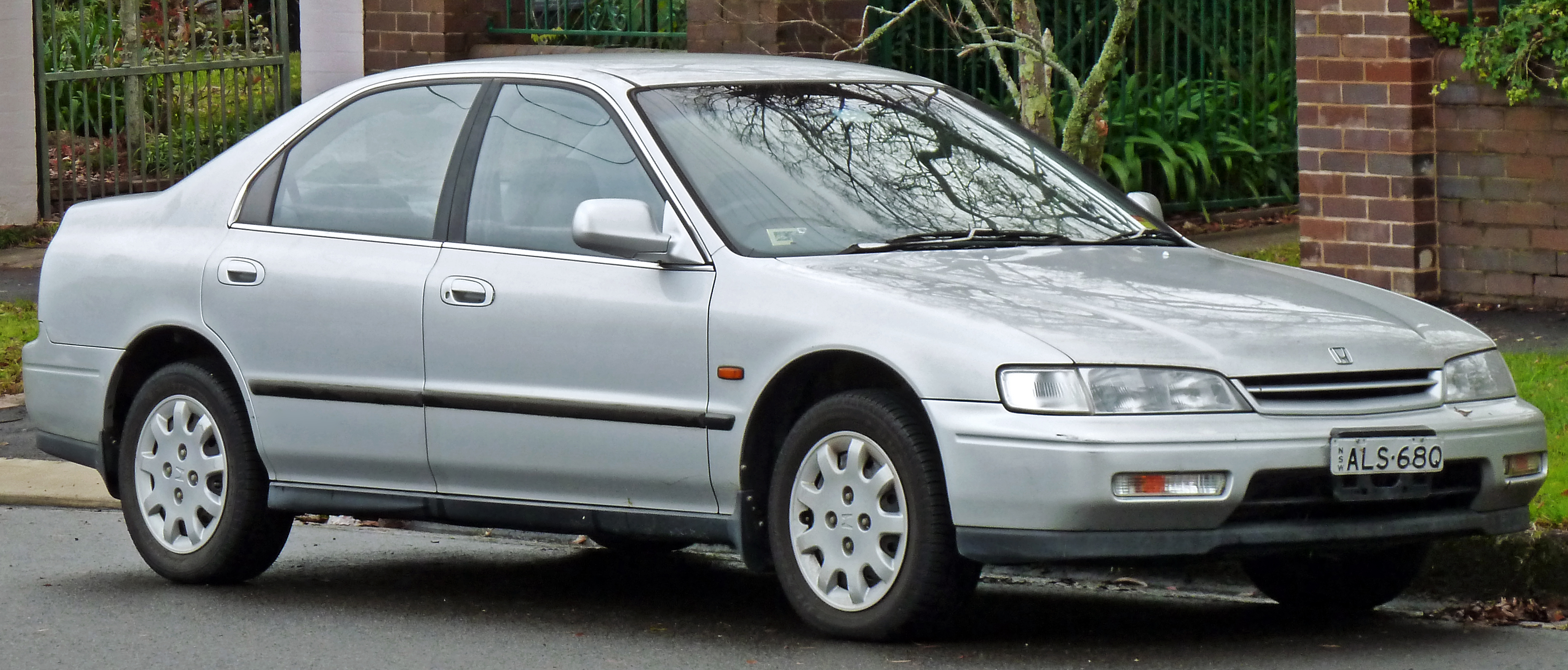
- 1993 Accord EXi sedan (pre-facelift, Australia)

Overview
- Model code: CD3/4/5/6/7/9
- Also called: Isuzu Aska; Xinkai HXK6360 (China; rebadged import)
- Production: September 1993 – August 1997
- Model years: 1994–1997
- Assembly: Marysville, Ohio, U.S. (Marysville Auto Plant); Sayama, Japan; Jalisco, Mexico (Honda de México); Nelson, New Zealand (Honda New Zealand); North Jakarta, Indonesia (PT. Prospect Motor); Santa Rosa City, Laguna, Philippines; Johor Bahru, Malaysia (OASB) Ayuthaya, Thailand (Honda Cars (Thailand) Co.); Hsinchu, Taiwan; Zhanjiang, Guangdong, China
- Designer: Yukio Kurosu, Kohichi Hirata (1990, 1992)

Body and chassis
- Class: Mid-size car
- Body style: 2-door coupe 4-door sedan 5-door station wagon
- Related: Acura CL; Acura TL; Honda/Acura Vigor; Honda Inspire

Powertrain
- Engine: gasoline: 1.8 L F18B2 SOHC VTEC I4 (CD3); 2.0 L F20B DOHC VTEC I4 (CD4); 2.0 L F20B3 SOHC I4 (CD9); 2.2 L F22 SOHC I4 (CD5, CD7, CF2); 2.2 L H22A I4 (CD6, CD8, CF2); 2.7 L C27A4 V6 (CE6)
- Transmission: 4-speed automatic 5-speed manual

Dimensions
- Wheelbase: 2,715 mm (106.9 in)
- Length: 1994–95 Wagon: 4,770 mm (188 in); 1994–95 Sedan & Coupe: 4,674 mm (184.0 in); 1996–97 Coupé & Sedan: 4,714 mm (185.6 in); 1996–97 Wagon & V6 Sedan: 4,785 mm (188.4 in)
- Width: 1,781 mm (70.1 in)
- Height: 1994–95 Wagon: 1,420 mm (55.9 in); Coupe: 1,389 mm (54.7 in); Sedan: 1,400 mm (55.1 in); 1996–97 V6 Sedan: 1,405 mm (55.3 in); 1996–97 LX Wagon: 1,422 mm (56.0 in); 1996–97 Wagon: 1,458 mm (57.4 in)
- Curb weight: 1,295 kg (2,855 lb)

Chronology
- Successor: Honda Accord (CF3/4/5 CL2/3); Honda Accord (CF8 CG1/2/3/4/5/6); Honda Crosstour (Accord wagon; North America and China)

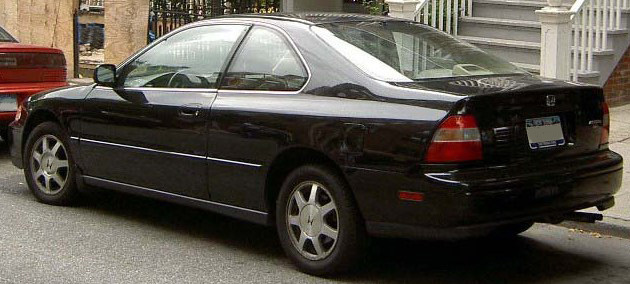
Coupe (pre-facelift, US)

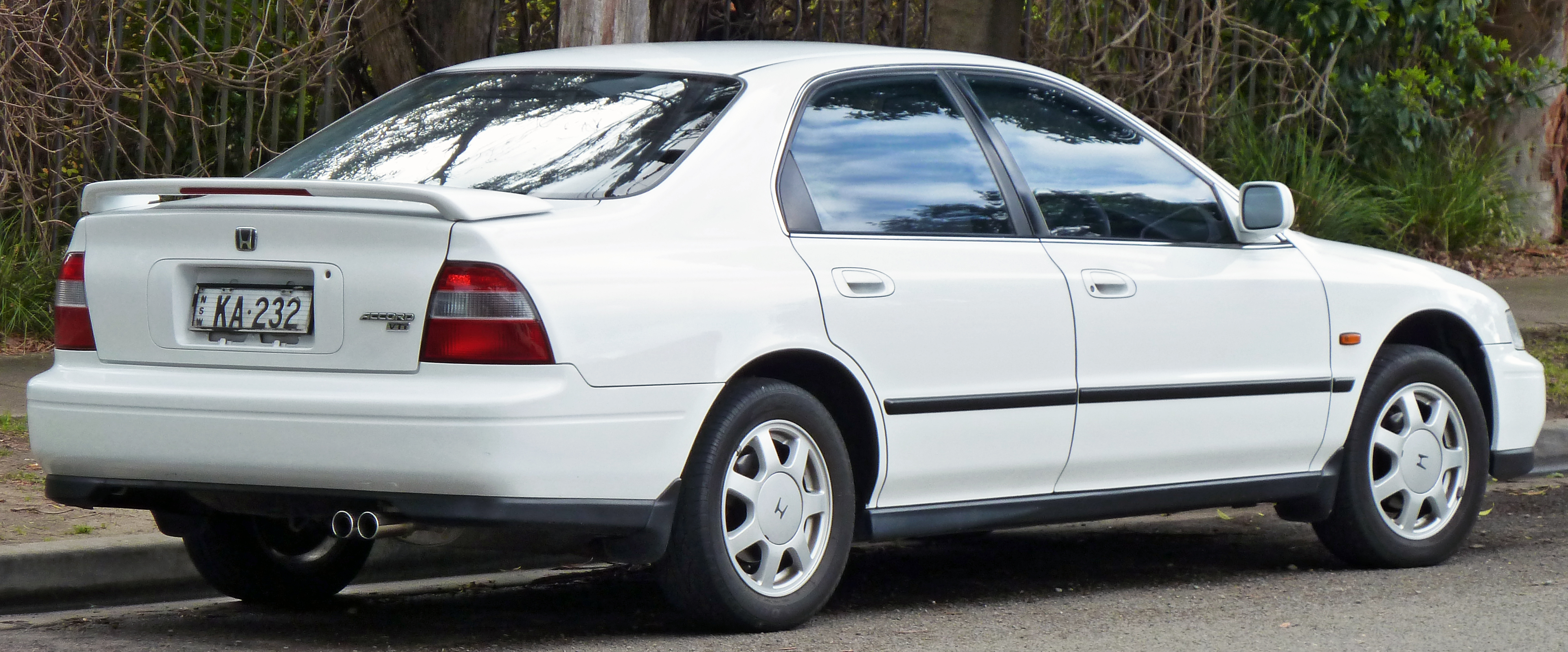
Sedan (pre-facelift, Australia)

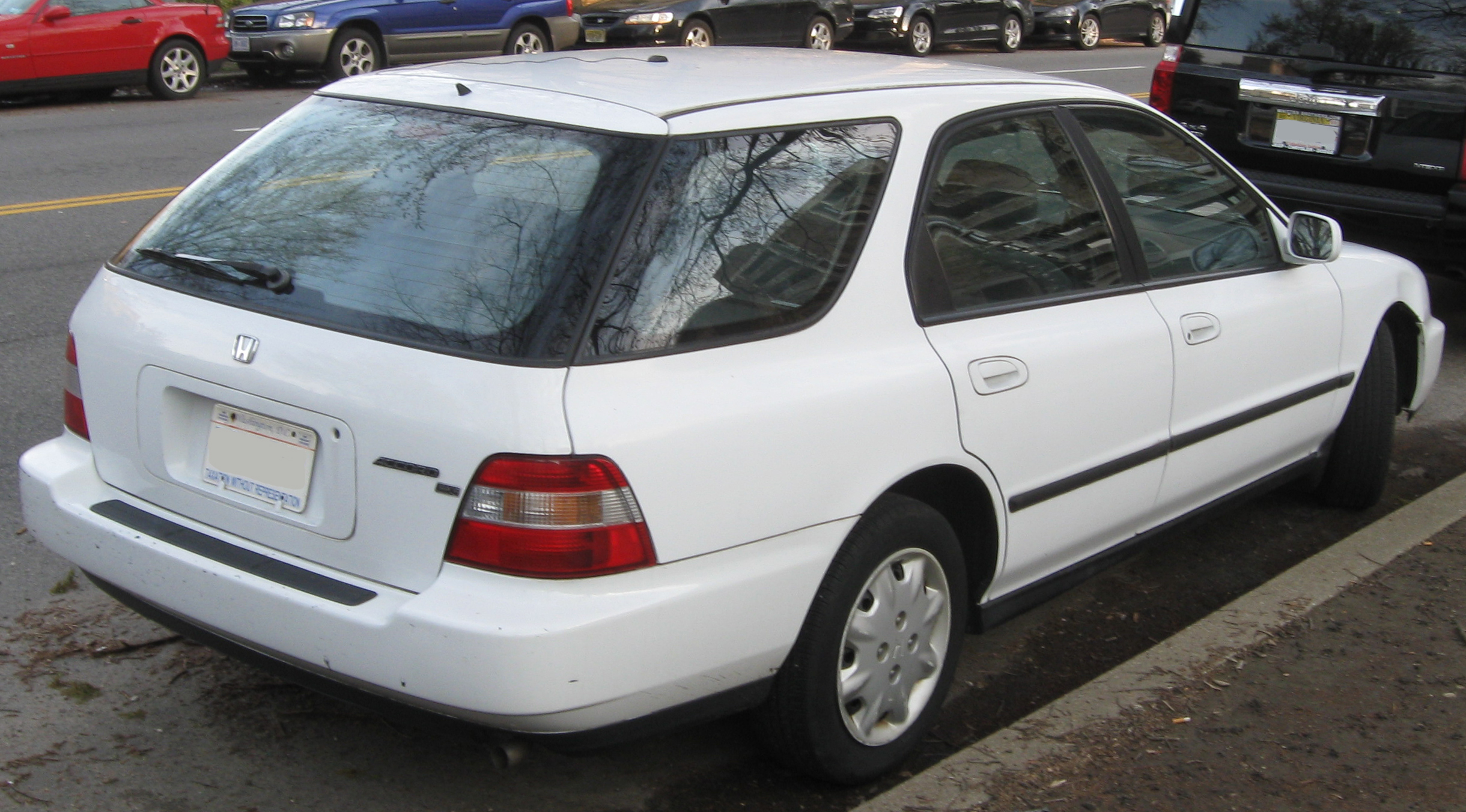
Accord Wagon LX (rear, US)

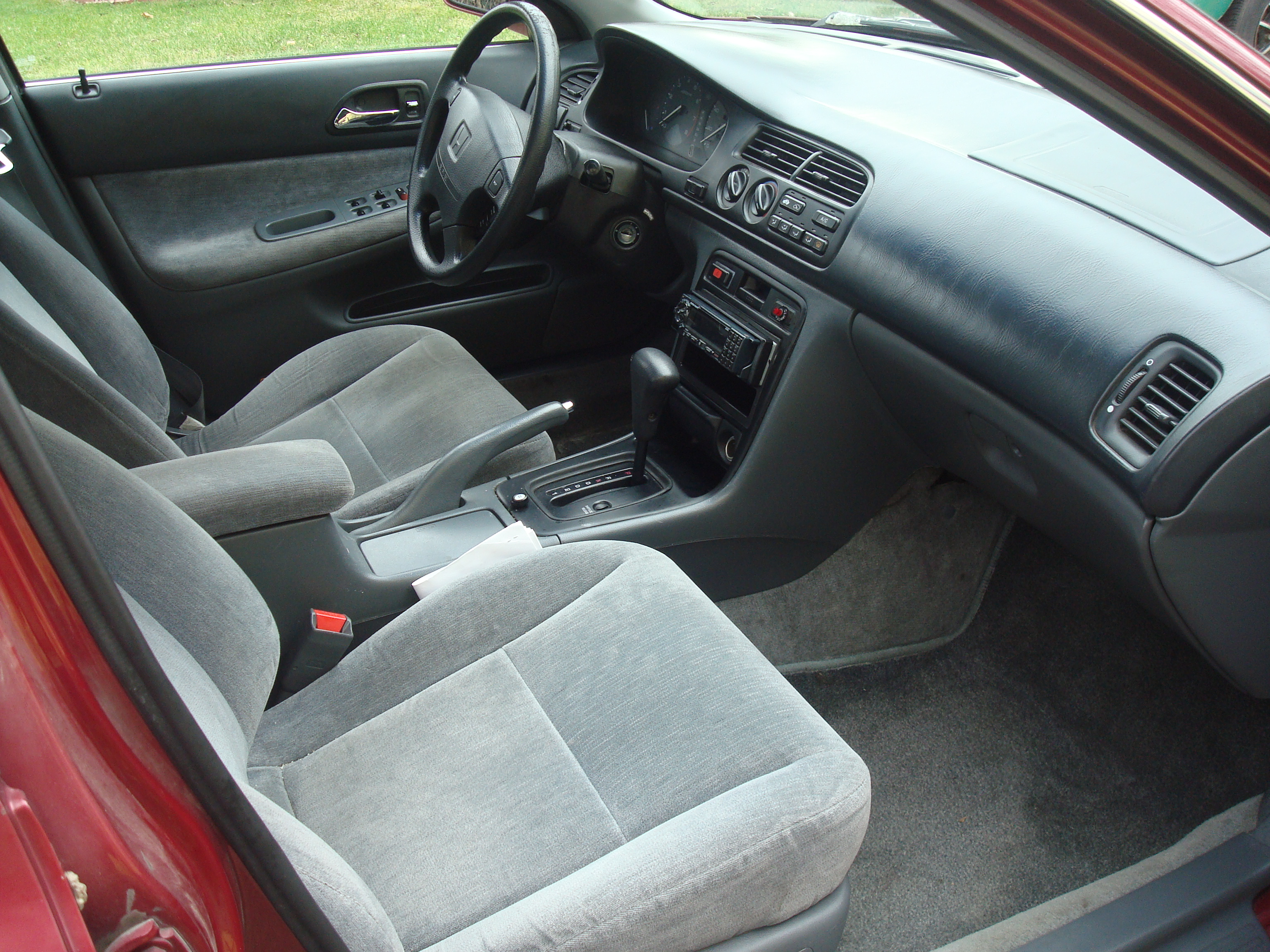
Interior (pre-facelift)

The fifth-generation North American Accord was launched on 9 September 1993, for the 1994 model year and was based on the new 'CD' chassis. Larger than its predecessor, primarily to better suit the requirements of the North American market, the new model grew in width but shrunk in length, leaving it classified as a mid-size car in North America. It thus became too wide to fit within the favorable tax bracket in Japan, where its role was to be partially taken over by the slightly narrower second-generation Honda Ascot (sold at Honda Primo Japanese dealerships) and Honda Rafaga (sold at Honda Verno). Previous generations of the Accord sold in Japan were limited to a width dimension of 1,695 mm (67 in) while international models were slightly wider, however, this generation no longer complied. The engines offered with the Accord also exceeded the maximum limit of 2000 cc to remain in the favorable "compact" tax bracket. The installation of a 2.0-litre engine in Japanese models made buyers liable for more annual road tax over the smaller 1.8-litre engine, which affected sales.

Development began in September 1989, along with the design process in June 1990. The final design was selected by an early date of 18 December 1990 and frozen by mid-1991. Design inconsistencies in early 1992, caused several alterations to be made until April 1992, when a secondary design freeze took place, ahead of scheduled 1993 production. Design patents were later filed in the United States on 16 December 1992 for the "CD". Production later began at Marysville assembly on 24 August 1993.

Honda of Japan marketed four different size engines in the Japanese-spec Accord sedan: 1.8, 2.0, 2.2 VTEC and 2.2 DOHC VTEC. The Japanese-spec Accord models were marketed as the following: EF, EX, 2.0EX, 2.0EXL, 2.2VTE, 2.2VTL, 2.2VTS and SiR. All Accord versions were sold at Honda's Clio locations in Japan.

The fifth-generation Accord became the first Accord to be built and sold in the Philippines.

The DX, LX and EX models remained the American trim lines, while Canada retained the LX, EX and EX-R. The 5-speed manual transmission remained mostly unchanged, while the 4-speed automatic noted for its hard shifts, now included Honda's "Grade-Logic" shift program, which would prevent "gear-hunting" by holding the current gear while driving on a sloped incline. All Accord models received a more ergonomic interior with standard safety features such as dual airbags and reinforced side-impact beams. Exclusive to the EX was the F22B1 SOHC VTEC version of previous-generation 2.2-litre 4-cylinder (making 145 hp (108 kW) up from 140 hp (104 kW) on the previous generation EX), anti-lock brakes (now an option for the LX), 4-wheel disc brakes, 15-inch alloy wheels, and a rear stabiliser bar. Leather was an option in the EX trim with leather-equipped models now being referred to as EX-L. DX and LX models came equipped similarly to the previous generation and were fitted with a revised version of the previous generation's 2.2-litre non-VTEC 4-cylinder engine. This F22B2 engine was rated at 130 hp (97 kW) up from 125 hp (93 kW) the previous generation. The Accord was again named Motor Trend Import Car of the Year for 1994. The Accord coupe as in the previous generation looked almost exactly like the sedan and was the last generation of the Accord to offer a wagon variant in North America until the introduction of the Accord Crosstour in 2009.

In 1994, the 1995 Accord debuted a V6 engine, the 2.7 L C27A borrowed from the first-generation Acura Legend, in the U.S. market. The V6 was offered in both the LX and EX versions of the sedan, LX models being referred to as LX-V6 and EX models as EX-V6. EX-V6 models came equipped similarly to the EX-L with leather seats being the only option in the EX-V6. The addition of the taller C27A engine required substantial alterations to the CD platform, with V6 models sporting a redesigned engine layout, taller front bumpers, and a different bonnet than I4 models; however, these differences are difficult to spot without both models parked side by side. Both versions of the V6 received a dual-outlet exhaust, a 4-speed automatic transmission, 15-inch machined aluminum-alloy wheels on the EX-V6, and 15-inch steel wheels with full covers on the LX-V6, and a slightly updated front grille (which would be later used in all 96–97 Accords). The Accord saw very few other changes for 1995 with the exception of a few different exterior and interior colour combinations.

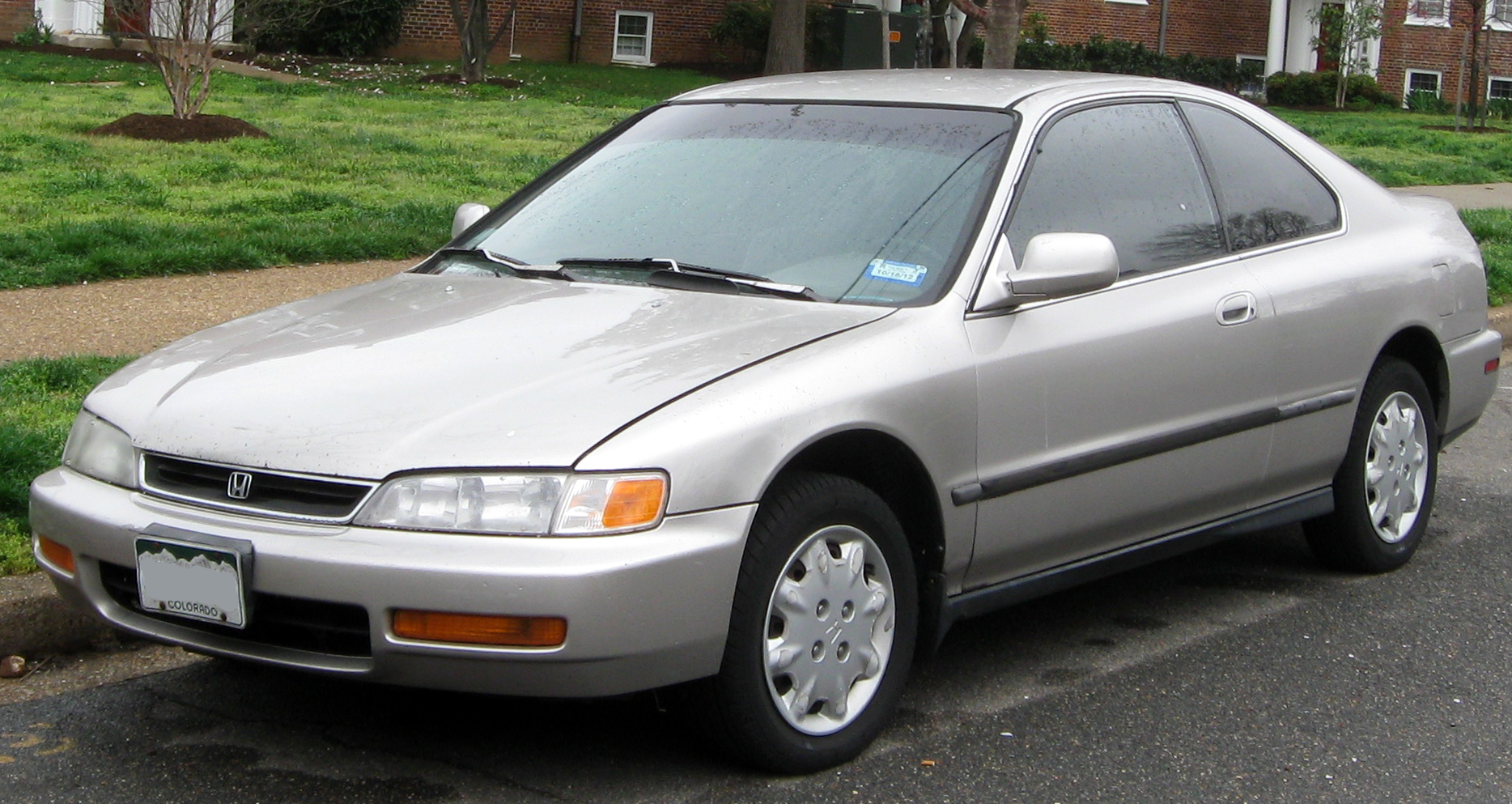
Coupe (facelift)

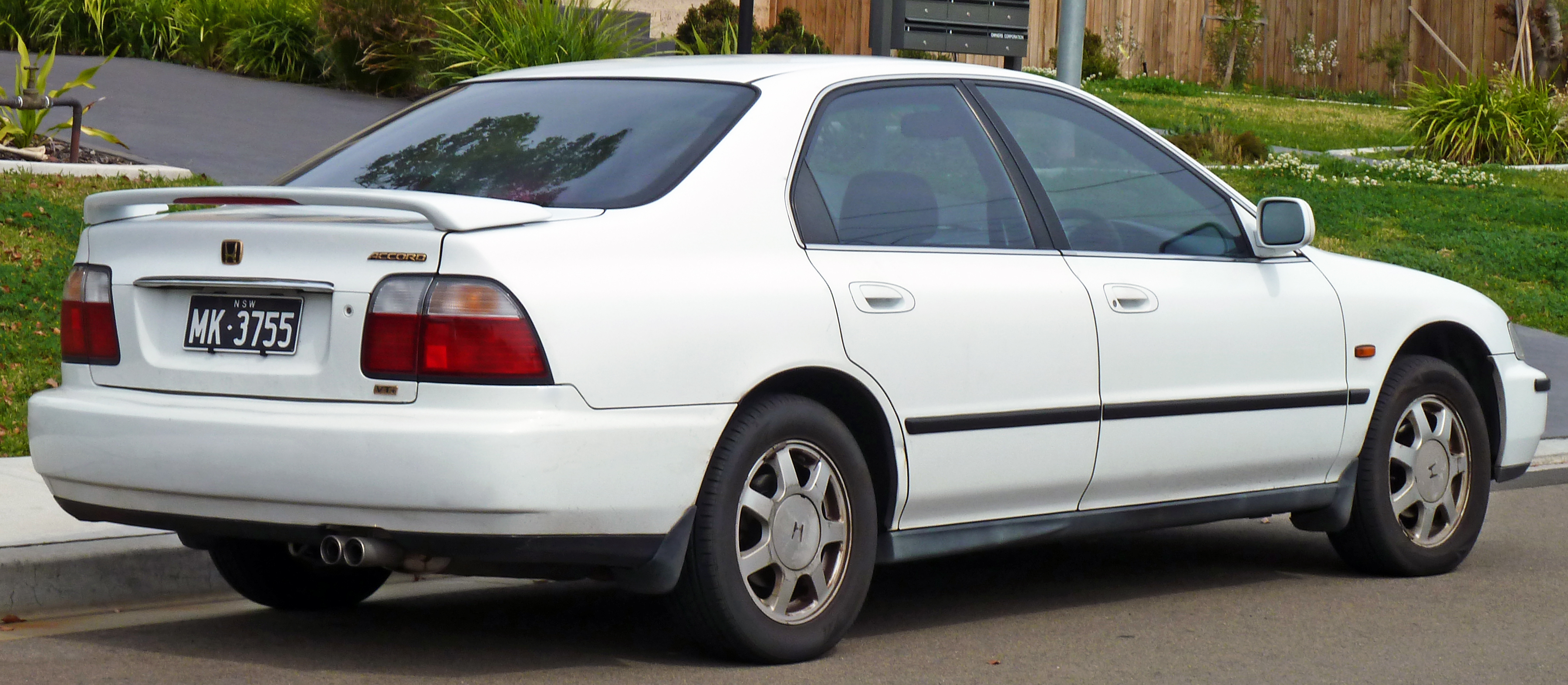
Sedan (facelift)

In 1995, the Accord underwent the usual mid-generation facelift for 1996. More rounded bumpers, a slightly modified front fascia (which was originally exclusive in the V6 models in 1995) with new signal lights and rear taillamps gave the Accord a softer look. All Hondas now complied with the federal government's requirement of OBD II engine diagnostics though all three engine choices remained the same. In order to increase the Accord's competitiveness against its rivals in different international markets, Honda CEO Nobuhiko Kawamoto decided on one basic platform for the sixth-generation Accord, but with different bodies and proportions for local markets. In the U.S., the 1996 model lineup included the 25th Anniversary Edition, a model positioned between the DX and LX. The Special Edition trim package was introduced.

In 1996, for the 1997 model year, Honda released the "Special Edition" version of the Accord (not to be confused with the SE). It was offered in three colours: Heather Mist Metallic, San Marino Red, and Dark Currant Pearl. The Special Edition received a factory-installed security system with keyless entry, single-disc CD player, body-coloured side molding, distinctive alloy wheels, and a sunroof. It was offered in automatic transmission only and was fitted with the same engine as the LX. Acclaimed for its handling, the 1996 Accord has been known as one of the best-handling Japanese mid-size sedans of all time, posting impressive lateral g figures of up to .89 g's.

In New Zealand, the fifth-generation Accord was assembled at Honda's manufacturing site in Nelson and was released in March 1994. It was available in LXi, EXi and EXi-S trim levels. A facelift was released in December 1995, which coincided with the release of VTEC engines in the upper-spec models. Trim levels were LXi, VTi, and VTi-S. These were the first NZ-market Accords to have airbags – two in the VTi-S, one in the VTi.

U.S.- and Japan-built coupe and wagon models of this generation were shipped to Europe with both left and right-hand-drive but there was no V6 option.

This generation of the Accord is one of the most frequently stolen cars in the U.S.

The 1994 Honda Accord was named Motor Trend's "Import Car of the Year".

==== Honda Accord SiR ====
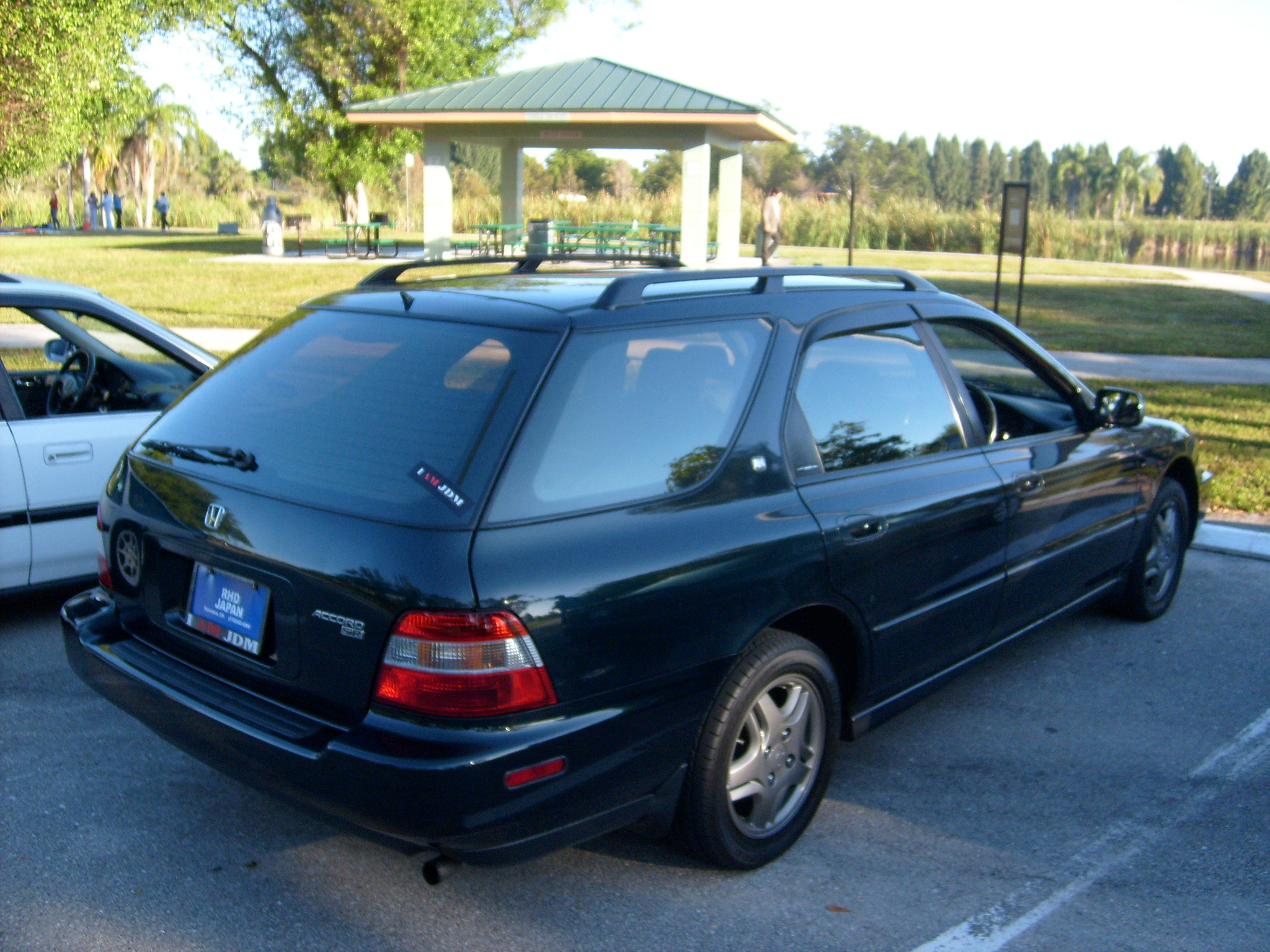
1996 Accord SiR Wagon

Honda of Japan produced three high-performance models of the Accord for the Japanese domestic market referred to as the SiR, which was available for sale at Honda Clio dealerships in Japan. The sports car approach to the Accord SiR was aimed at aligning the Accord with the Honda Verno sports sedan that replaced the Vigor, called the Honda Saber a platform-mate shared with the Honda Inspire. The compact sedan role the Accord previously filled was now relegated to the Honda Rafaga and Ascot. The Accord SiR models came equipped with the Japan-spec 2.2-litre DOHC VTEC (H22A) four-cylinder engine instead of the 2.2-litre SOHC VTEC (F22B1) four-cylinder engine found in the EX. The Japan-spec H22A engine specs were 190 PS (140 kW; 187 bhp) at 6,800 rpm; peak torque 152 lb⋅ft (206 N⋅m) at 5,500 rpm with a compression ratio of 10.6:1. The Japan-spec H22A engine was similar to the H22A1 engine found in the North American market used in the 1993-1996 Prelude VTEC.

The Japan-built SiR sedan (94–97) was available with a 5-speed manual transmission as standard equipment or an optional "Grade-Logic" 4-speed automatic transmission. The Honda of America-built (HAM) Accord SiR coupe and then the 1997 SiR wagon had the "Grade-Logic" four-speed automatic transmission as standard equipment (5-speed manual transmission were not available for these two models). It came with cloth sport seats styled similar to the Prelude or optional leather seats, both exclusive to the SiR. The SiR also had some power options found on the Accord EX. The Accord SiR coupe (94–97) and the Accord SiR wagon (1997) were exclusively available for the Japanese market. SiR chassis codes for the sedan were the CD6, the coupe-CD8, and the 1997 wagon-CF2 (production began in September 1996 for the 1997 SiR wagons which lasted for almost one year). The Accord SiR Coupe and the Accord SiR wagon (1997), which were exclusively built in the United States at Honda's Marysville Ohio plant (HAM) but were marketed for Japan export only for this particular model, was not offered in North America.

The Accord SiR Coupe and then Accord SiR wagon was built with the Japan-spec H22A powertrains which were shipped from Japan and were installed into the HAM-built Accord SiR models. The 1994–1997 "CD" Accord chassis was designed for the H22A powertrain to be installed; because the firewall was curved at the top to allow more space for the tilting backward of the H22A engine near the middle of the firewall. The H22A 4-cylinder engine was the most powerful inline 4-cylinder engine Honda built for the Prelude and the Accord before the 1995 U.S.-spec V6 sedan. The Accord SiR suspension was improved with a stiffer front sway bar (27.2 mm x 4.0 mm), stiffer rear sway bar (16 mm), stiffer front and rear coil springs.

Features for the 94–95 Accord SiR models (sedans and coupes) included the following items: cruise control, automatic climate control (Similar to the first-generation Acura CL), Bose stereo system, 7,400 redline tachometer, optional electronic traction control, and optional limited-slip differential for automatic transmission, optional SRS and airbags, factory-installed driving lights, optional factory-installed "pop up" navigation radio head unit, sound insulation liner under front bonnet, black-housing headlamps, no side molding was available on the Accord SiR sedan, optional rear sunscreen, optional sunroof, and power-retractable outside mirrors. Features for the 96–97 Accord SiR models (sedans, coupes, and wagons) included the same as above while adding; optional cruise control, rear window wiper on the sedan, optional leather interior, and a coloured side molding for the sedan as well.

=== European model ===
Fifth generation Europe
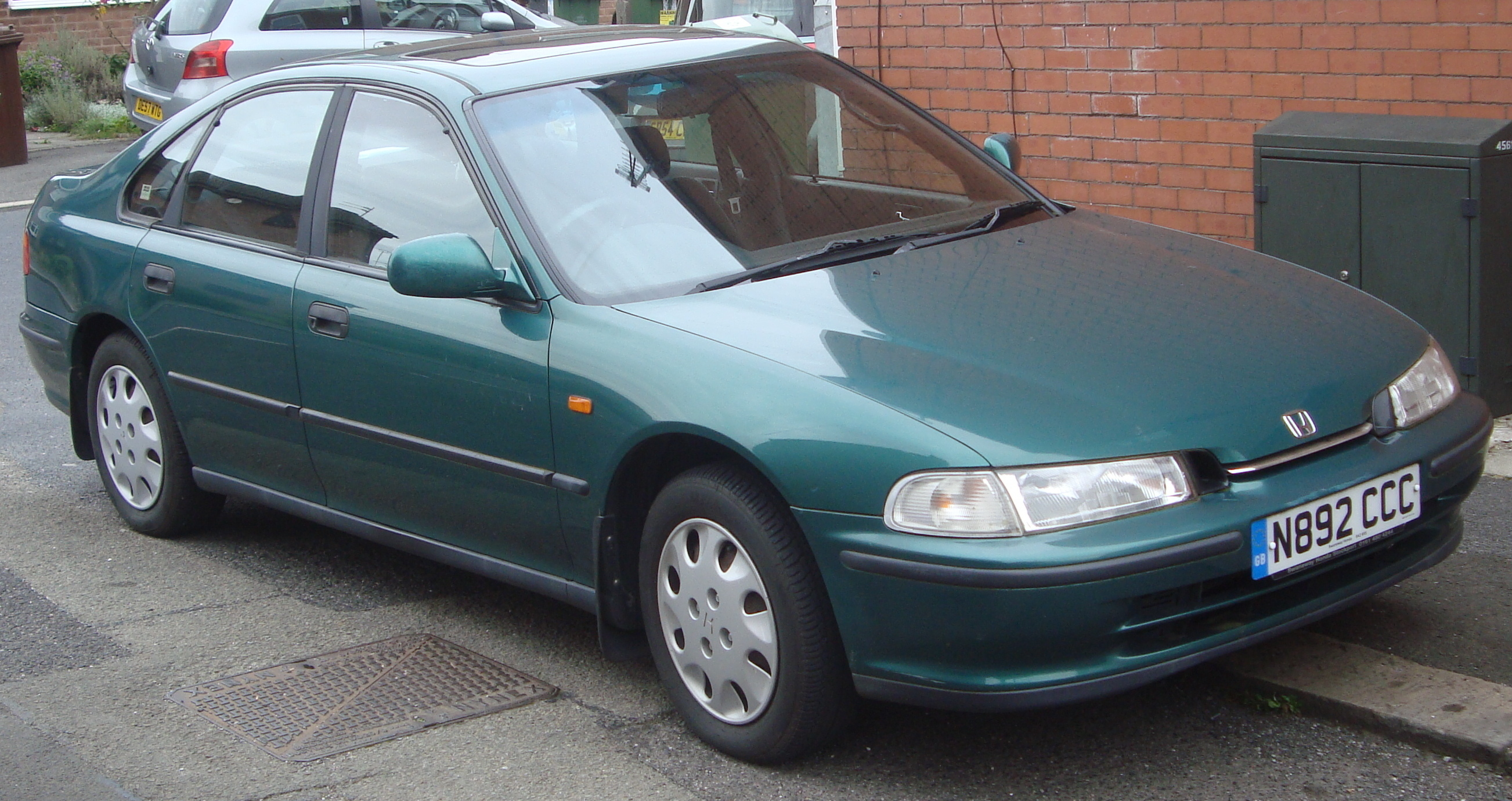
- European-spec Accord (pre-facelift)

Overview
- Model code: CC7; CE7/8/9
- Also called: Honda Ascot Innova (Japan)
- Production: 1993–1998
- Assembly: Swindon, England (HUKM)
- Designer: Shigeo Ueno (1989)

Body and chassis
- Class: Large family car
- Body style: 4-door sedan
- Related: Rover 600

Powertrain
- Engine: petrol: 1.8 L F18A3 SOHC I4; 2.0 L F20Z SOHC I4; 2.2 L F22Z2 SOHC I4; 2.3 L H23A3 DOHC I4; diesel: 2.0 L Rover 20T2N (turbo intercooler) I4

Dimensions
- Wheelbase: 2,720 mm (107.1 in)
- Length: 4,675 mm (184.1 in)
- Width: 1,715 mm (67.5 in)
- Height: 1,380 mm (54.3 in)
- Curb weight: 1,240–1,375 kg (2,734–3,031 lb)

Chronology
- Successor: Honda Accord (CG7/8/9 CH5/6/7/8) (Europe)

The fifth-generation Accord for the European market was unveiled in 1993 and was completely different from the global model ('CD'). It was in fact the Japanese-market Honda Ascot Innova which was based on the previous fourth-generation 'CB' Accord. It was the result of a joint effort with the Rover Group that provided Rover with the 600 series. The exterior was designed by Shigeo Ueno, was finalised in 1989. The styling of the European Accord differed dramatically from the larger North American variant which featured a more conventional sedan styling compared to the European model's low slung, fastback-inspired look which also incorporated rear quarter windows.

In 1996, the European Accord received a minor facelift and was given a new front end and slightly different taillamps. The styling of the facelifted Accord remained identical to the styling of the Ascot Innova (although the frameless doors were replaced with conventional items) and featured the design language first introduced on the fifth-generation Honda Civic. The facelifted Accord was also equipped with two airbags as standard.

However, the European Accord did not spawn a station wagon nor a coupé version. Instead, Honda opted to import the coupé and station wagon (Aerodeck) versions of the global Accord.

The diesel model of the Accord was fitted with the direct injection Rover L-series diesel engine, as also fitted in the Rover 600.

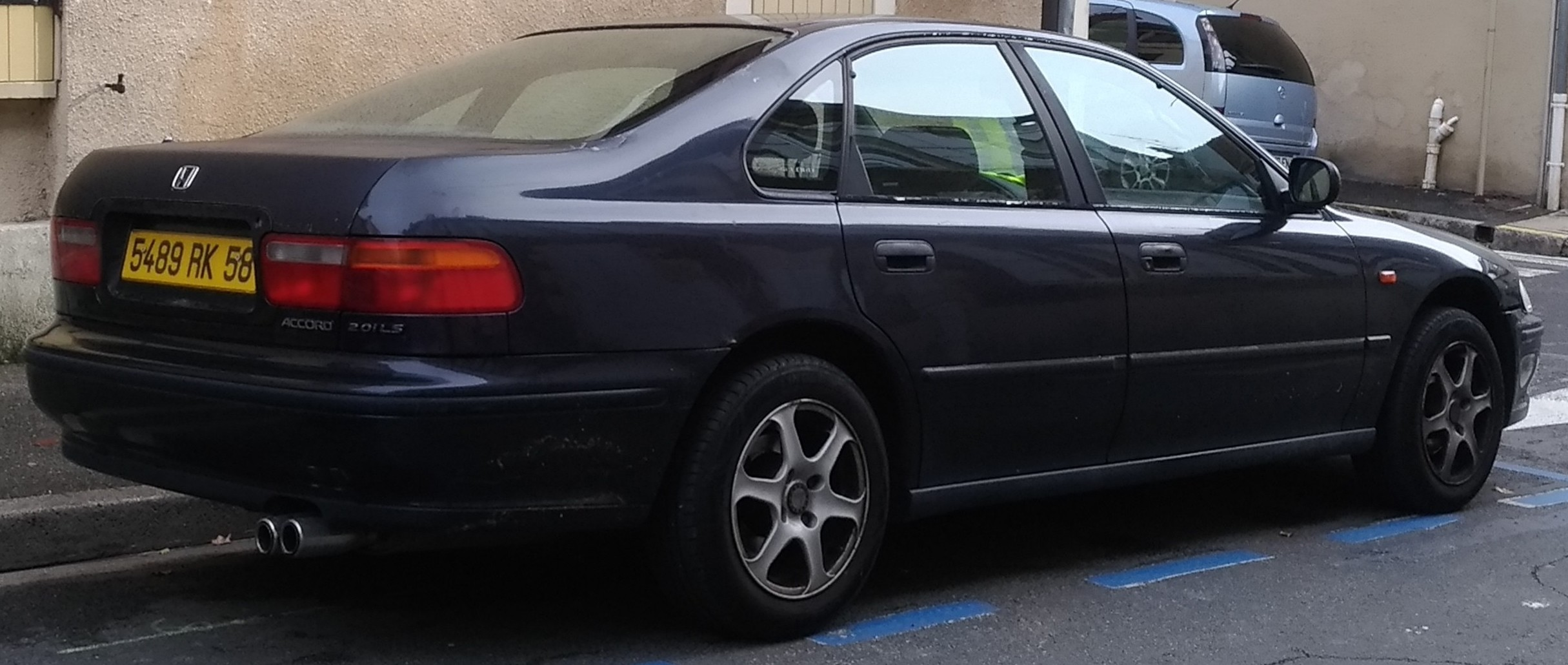
European-spec Accord (pre-facelift)

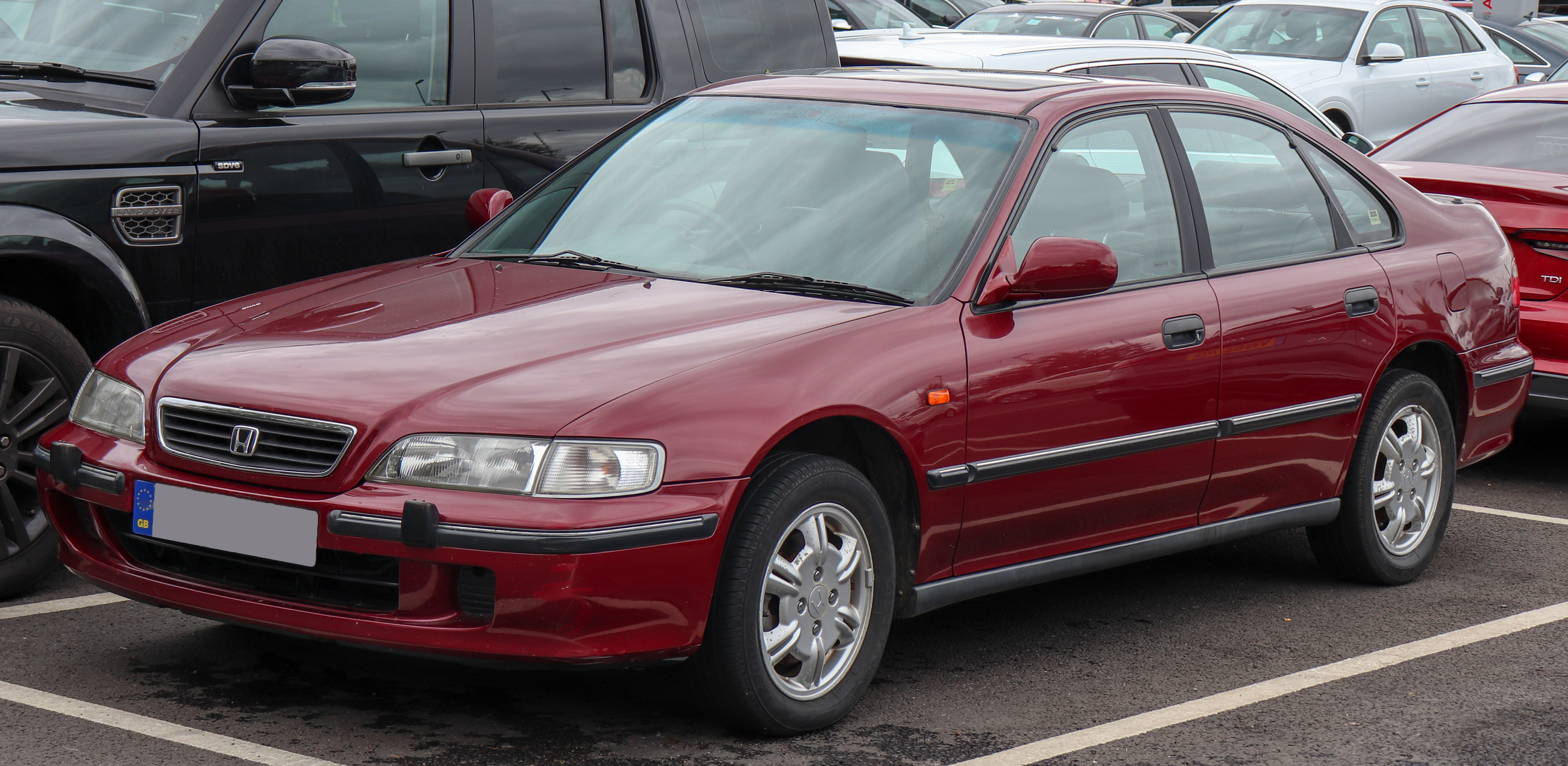
1996 European-spec Accord (facelift)

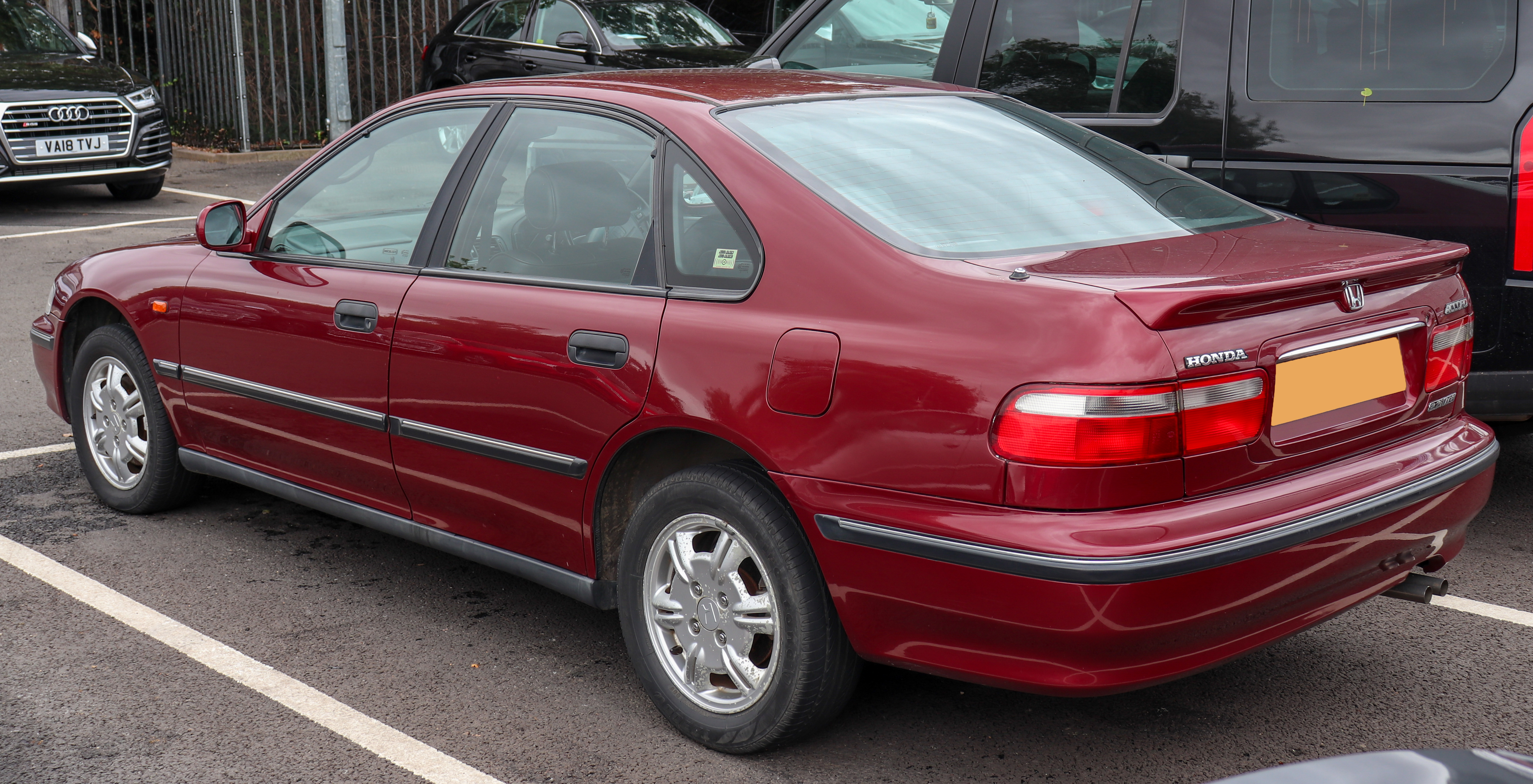
1996 European-spec Accord (facelift)

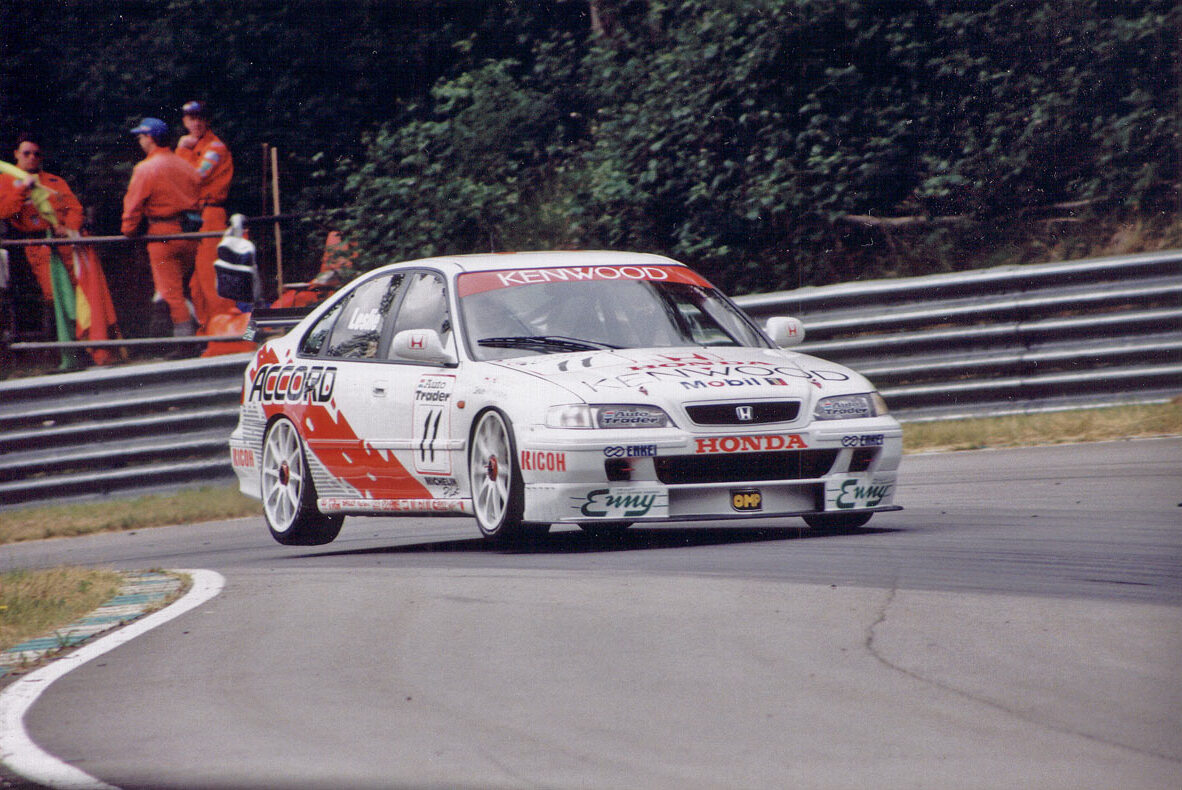
BTCC Honda Accord built to Super Touring regulations.

==== Rover 600 ====
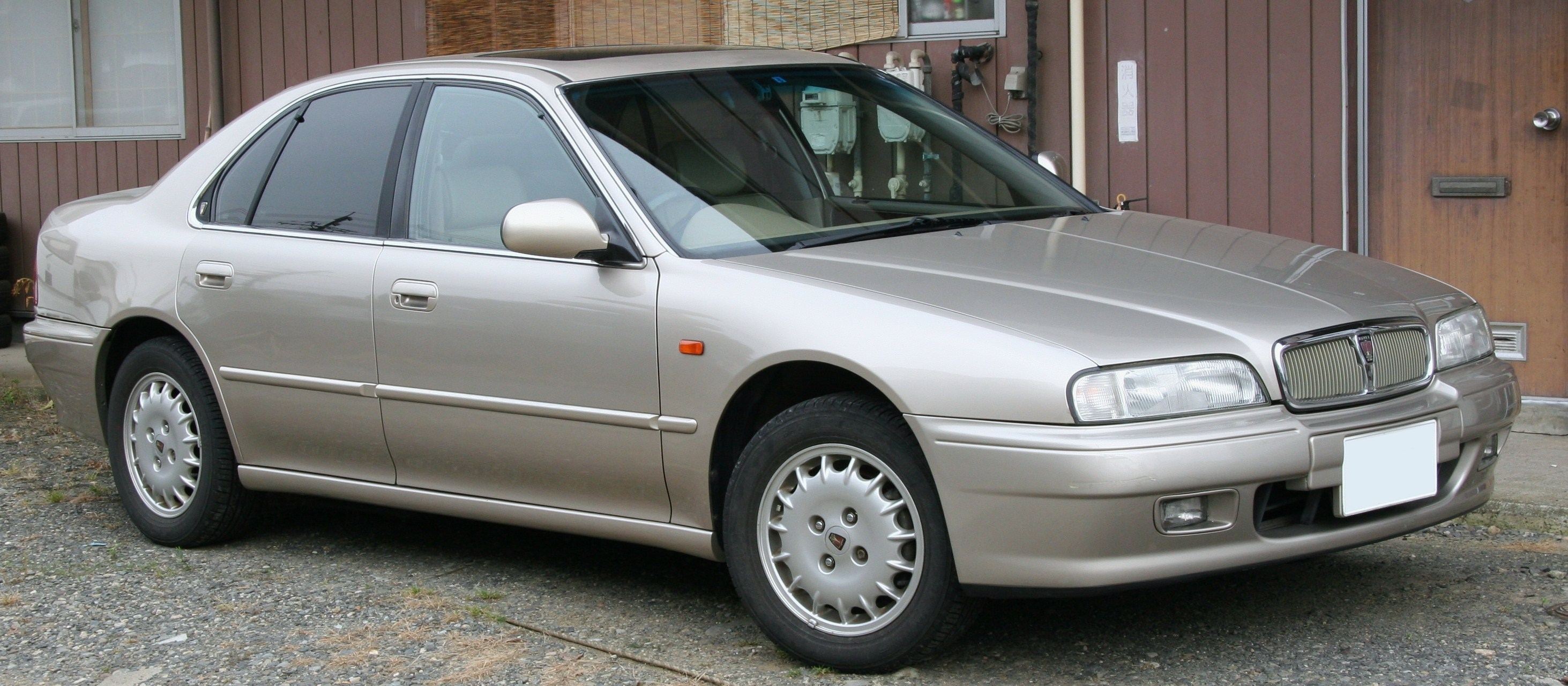
Rover 600

As part of the tie-up with the Rover Group the European Accord spawned Rover's replacement for the Austin Montego in 1993. Called the 600, the car shared its platform with the European Accord and, with the exception of the front doors, lower rear doors, and windscreen, sported unique styling which dispensed with the rear quarter windows. The interior design of the 600 was very similar to the Accord's however, while the dashboard design was identical.

== Sixth generation (1998) ==
For the sixth generation, Honda split the Accord into three separate models, designed for the Japanese, North American and Australasia, and European markets respectively. However, the wagon was discontinued in North America while the coupé was discontinued in Japan. This generation also spawned two distinctively branded performance versions for European and Japanese domestic markets, dubbed Type R, and Euro R, respectively.

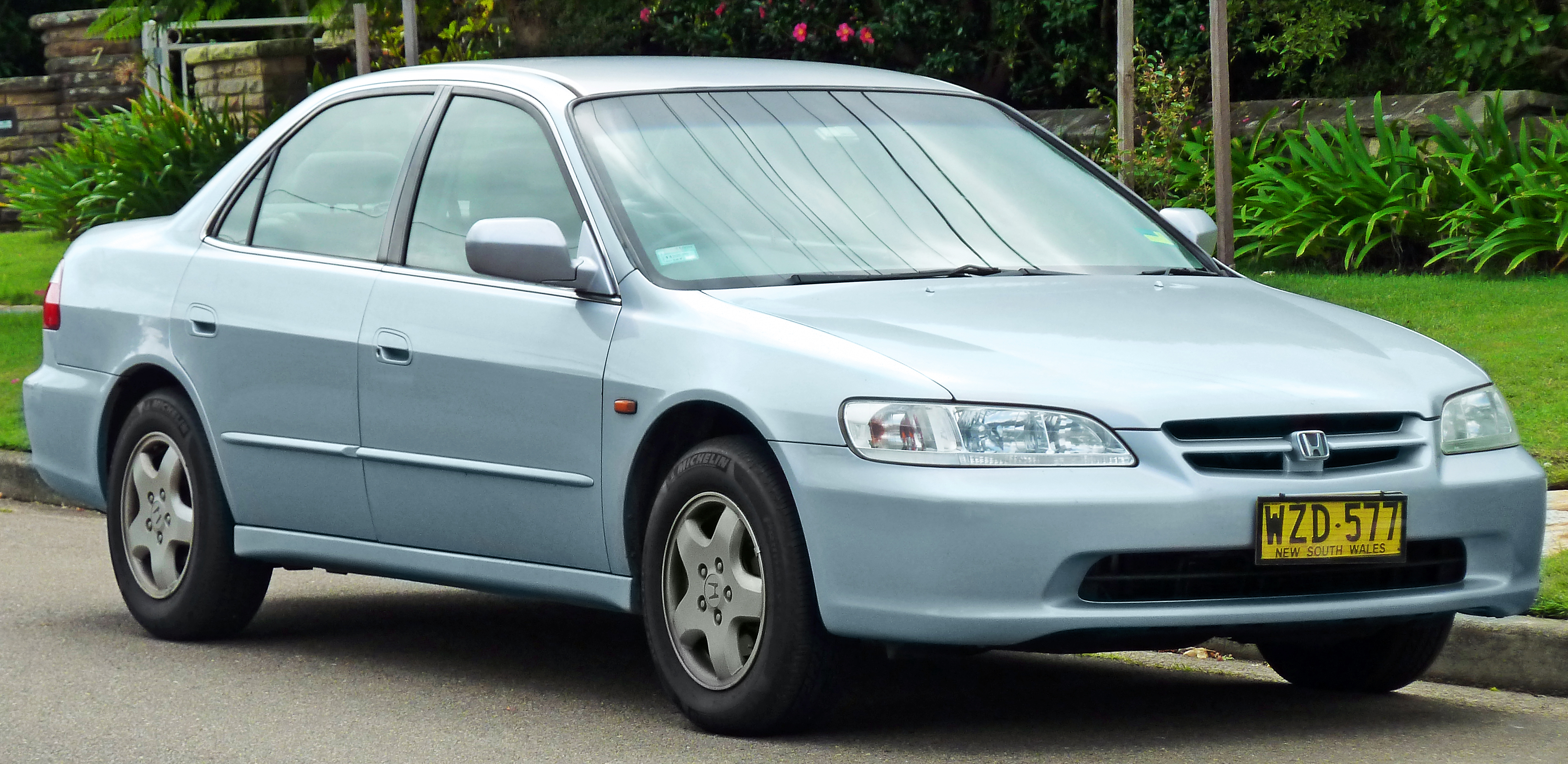
Sixth generation Accord (Australia)

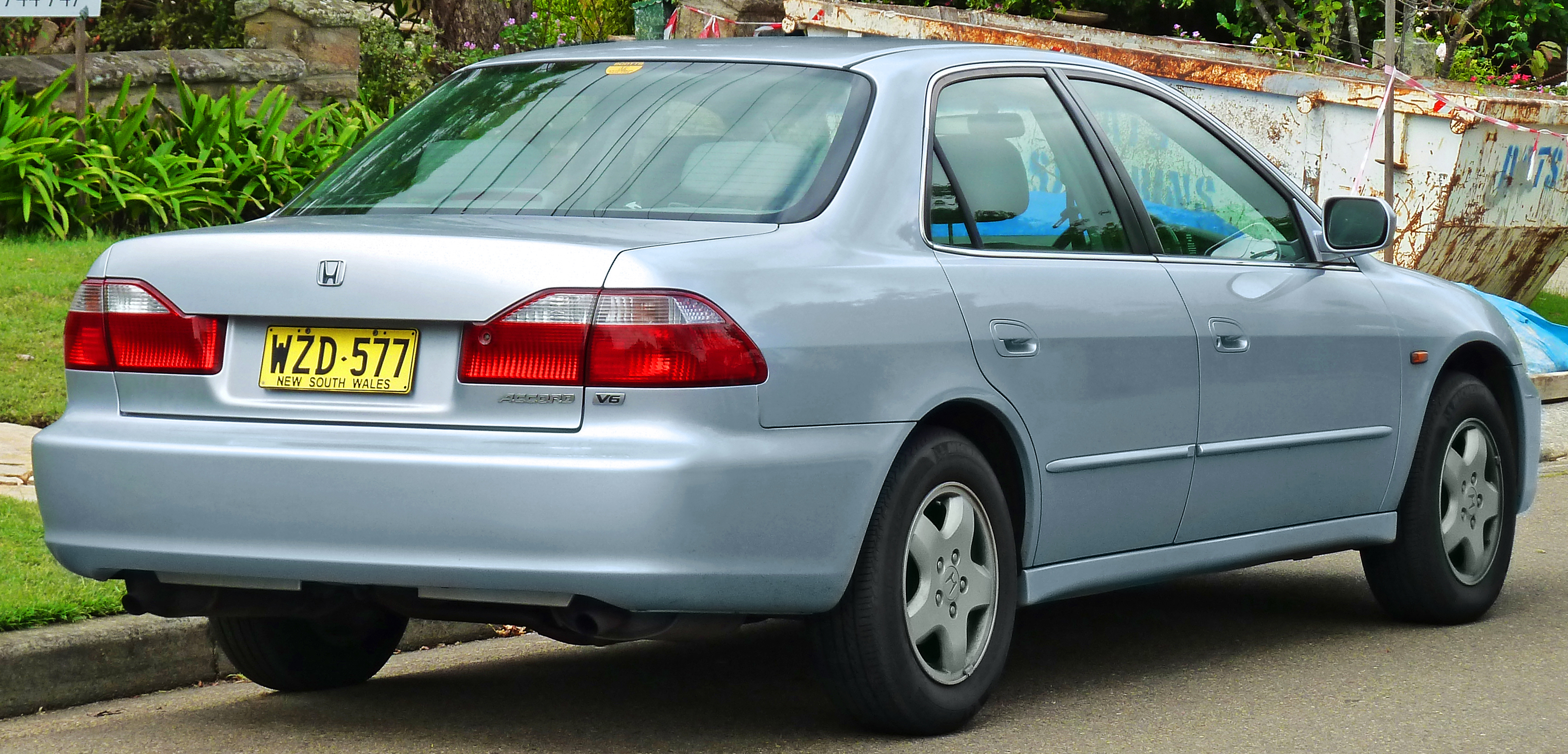

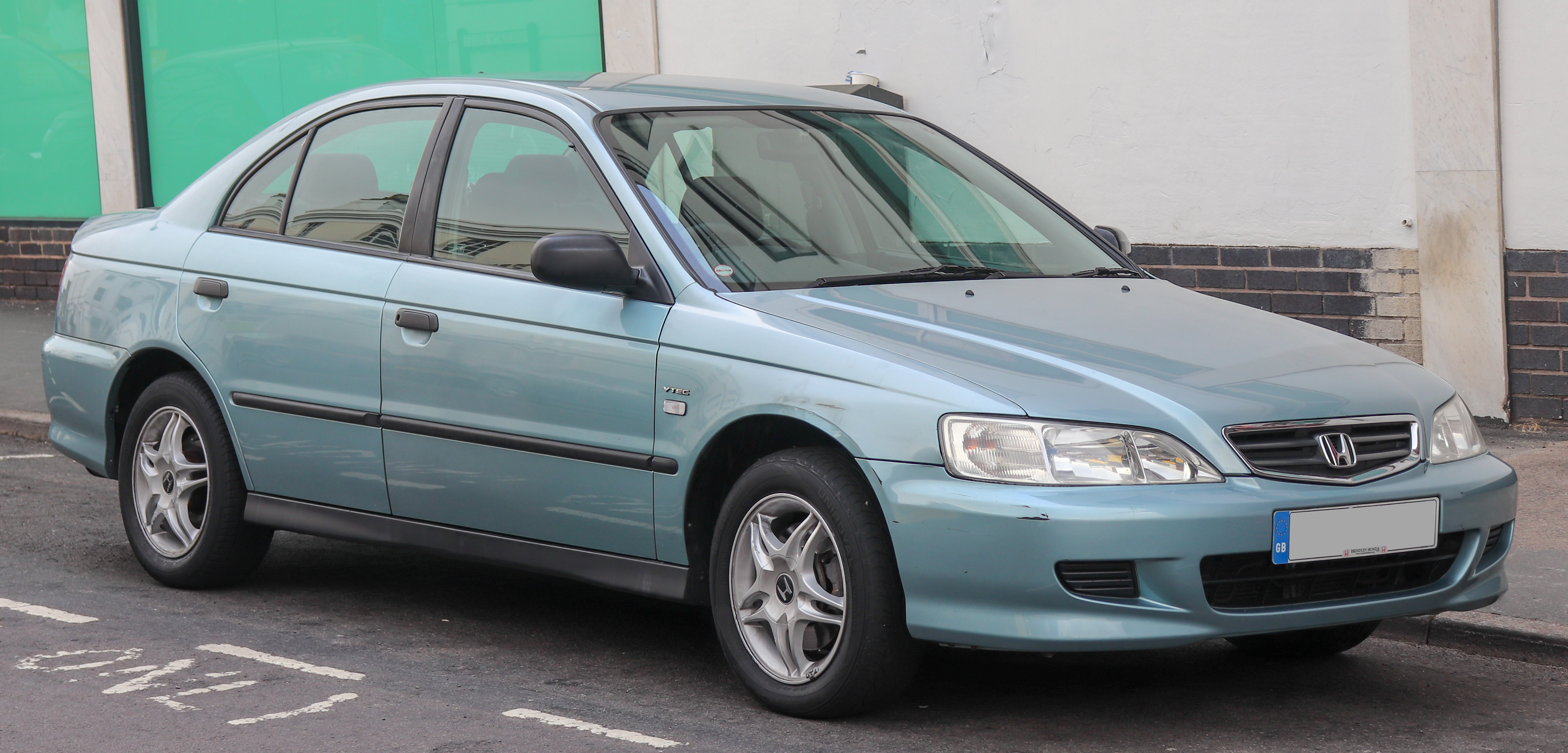
Sixth generation Accord (Europe)

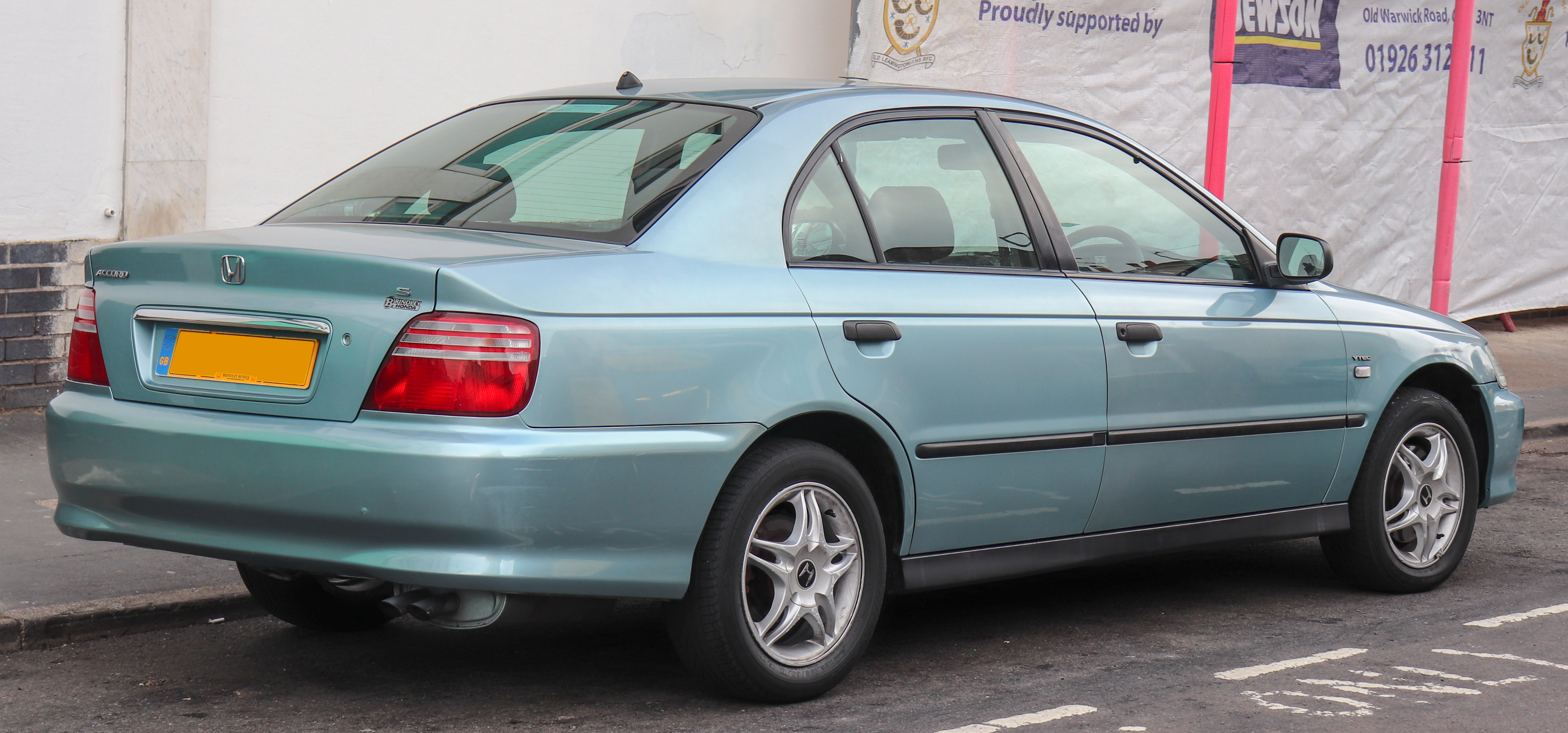

== Seventh generation (2002) ==
The seventh generation of the Accord was launched in 2002 for the 2003 model year, and consists of two separate models; one for the Japanese and European markets, and the other for North America (CM5), with the Japanese and European model being sold in North America as the Acura TSX. However, both were in fact sold in many other markets, fueled by the popular Cog advertisement for the Accord. Euro R trim continued into this generation as a performance model for the Japanese market, making use of K20 engine producing 220 PS (162 kW; 217 hp), however, European performance model was renamed Type S and used a larger K24 engine tuned to produce 190 PS (140 kW; 187 hp).

=== Japan and Europe ===
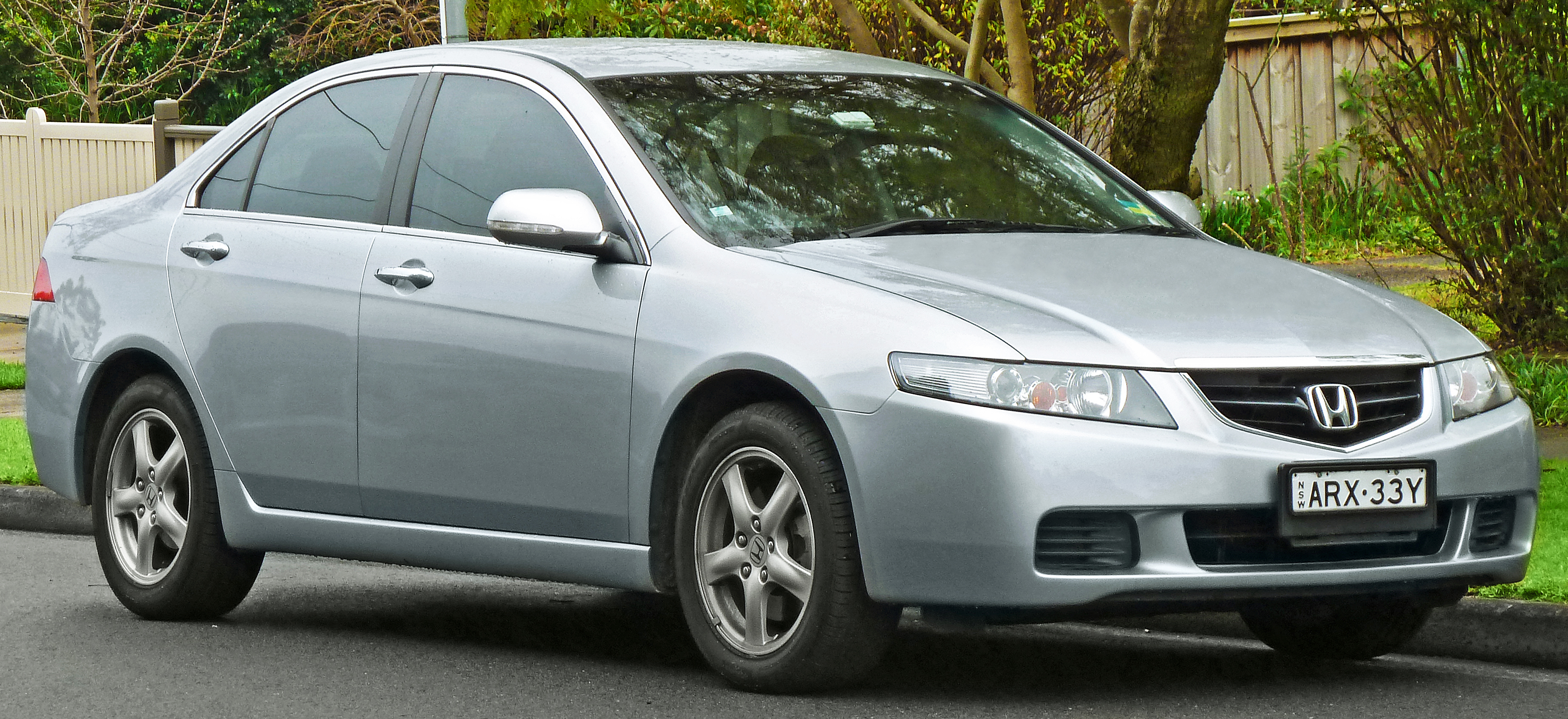
Seventh generation Accord (Japan, Europe and Australasia)

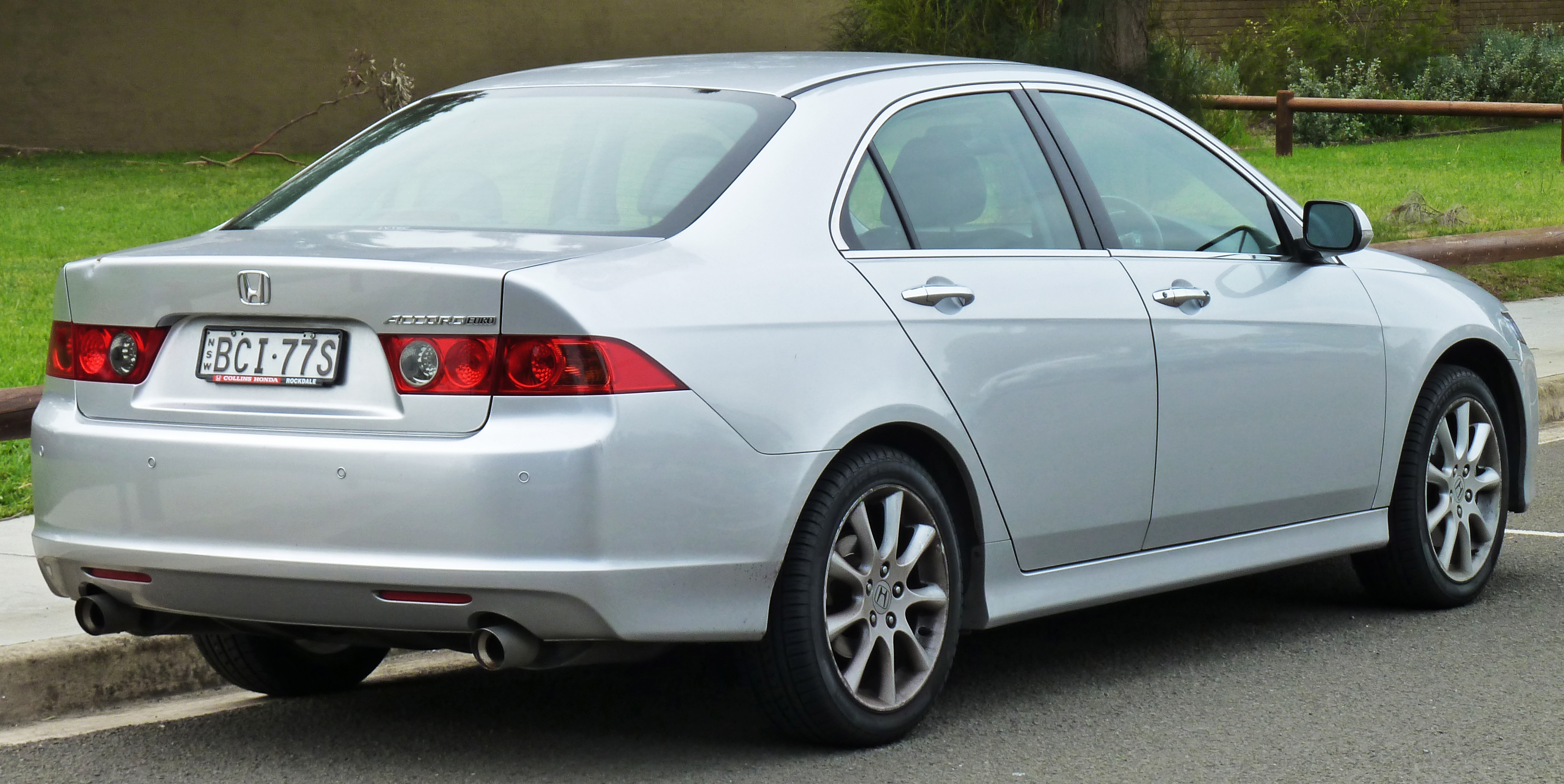
Seventh generation Accord (Japan, Europe and Australasia)

The European and Japanese Accords were integrated on the previous Japanese Accord's chassis, but with a new body. No longer made in Swindon, those Accords were made in Japan, and came in both sedan and station wagon form.

At its introduction in 2003, it won the Car of the Year Japan Award for a record third time. In Europe, the car featured a 2.0 i-VTEC with 155 PS (114 kW; 152 hp), a 2.4 i-VTEC with 190 PS (140 kW; 187 hp), and an "exceptional" 2.2 i-CTDi turbo-diesel N22A1 engine, initially with 140 PS (103 kW; 138 hp) and 340 N⋅m (251 lbf⋅ft) of torque, while doing 51 mpg on the EU combined cycle.

This model was sold in certain markets such as Fiji, Australia, and New Zealand as the "Accord Euro" and in North America as the Acura TSX, with a significant distinction being that the TSX featured the interior of the contemporary Honda Inspire instead.

==== Accord Euro R (CL7) ====
The Honda Accord Euro R (CL7) was launched in October 2002, succeeding the previous Euro R (CL1). A lightened and more sports-focused variant of the Japanese car the Accord Euro R was powered by the K20A 2.0L DOHC i-VTEC engine producing 220 PS (162 kW; 217 hp) at 8000 rpm and 21 kg⋅m (206 N⋅m; 152 lb⋅ft) of torque at 7000 rpm through the only option of a lightweight 6-speed manual transmission. A similar engine can be found in the JDM Integra Type R (DC5). The Accord Euro-R was only available to the Japanese Domestic Market. Some features that distinguish it are the Recaro seats, the body kit, a MOMO steering wheel, lightweight 17-inch alloys, and a special aluminum gear knob found only in Honda's Type R variants.

=== North America and Asia Pacific ===
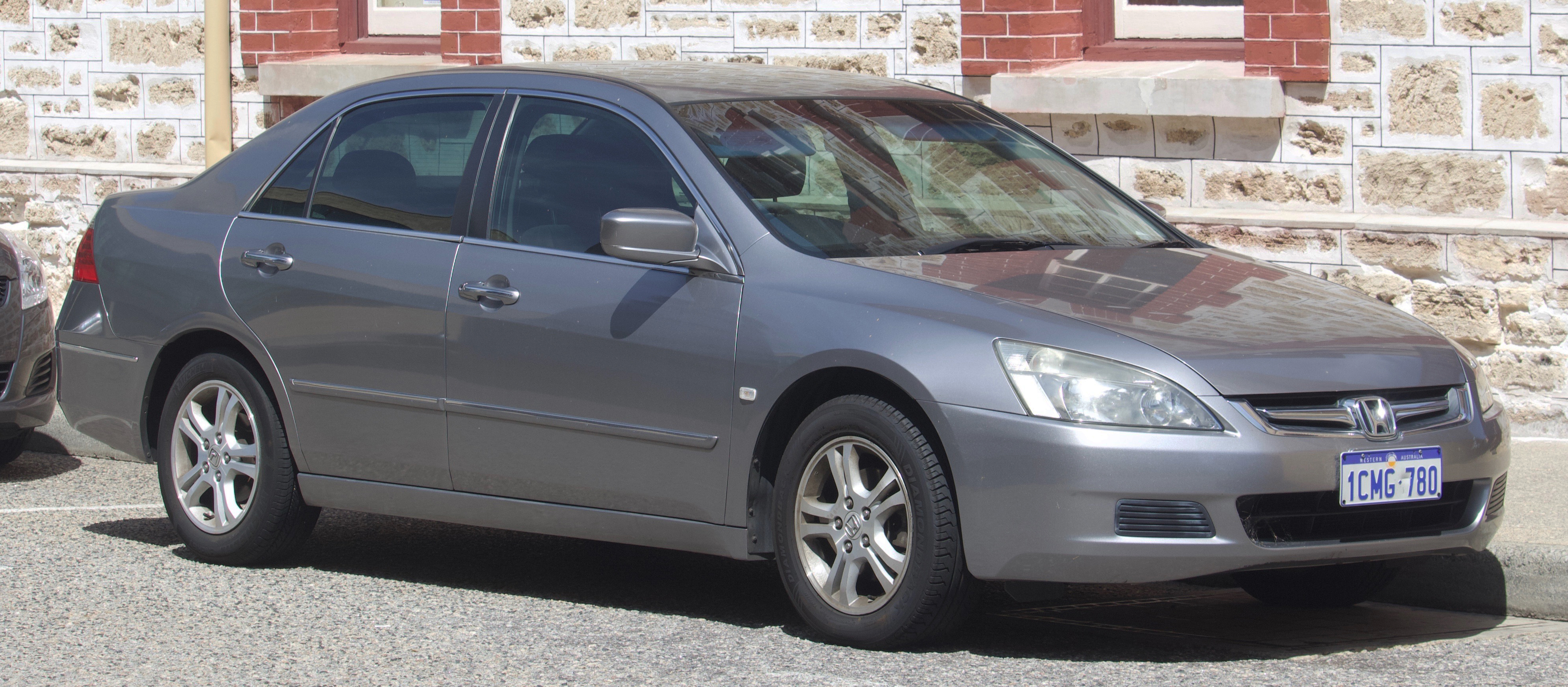
Honda Accord (North America and Asia Pacific)

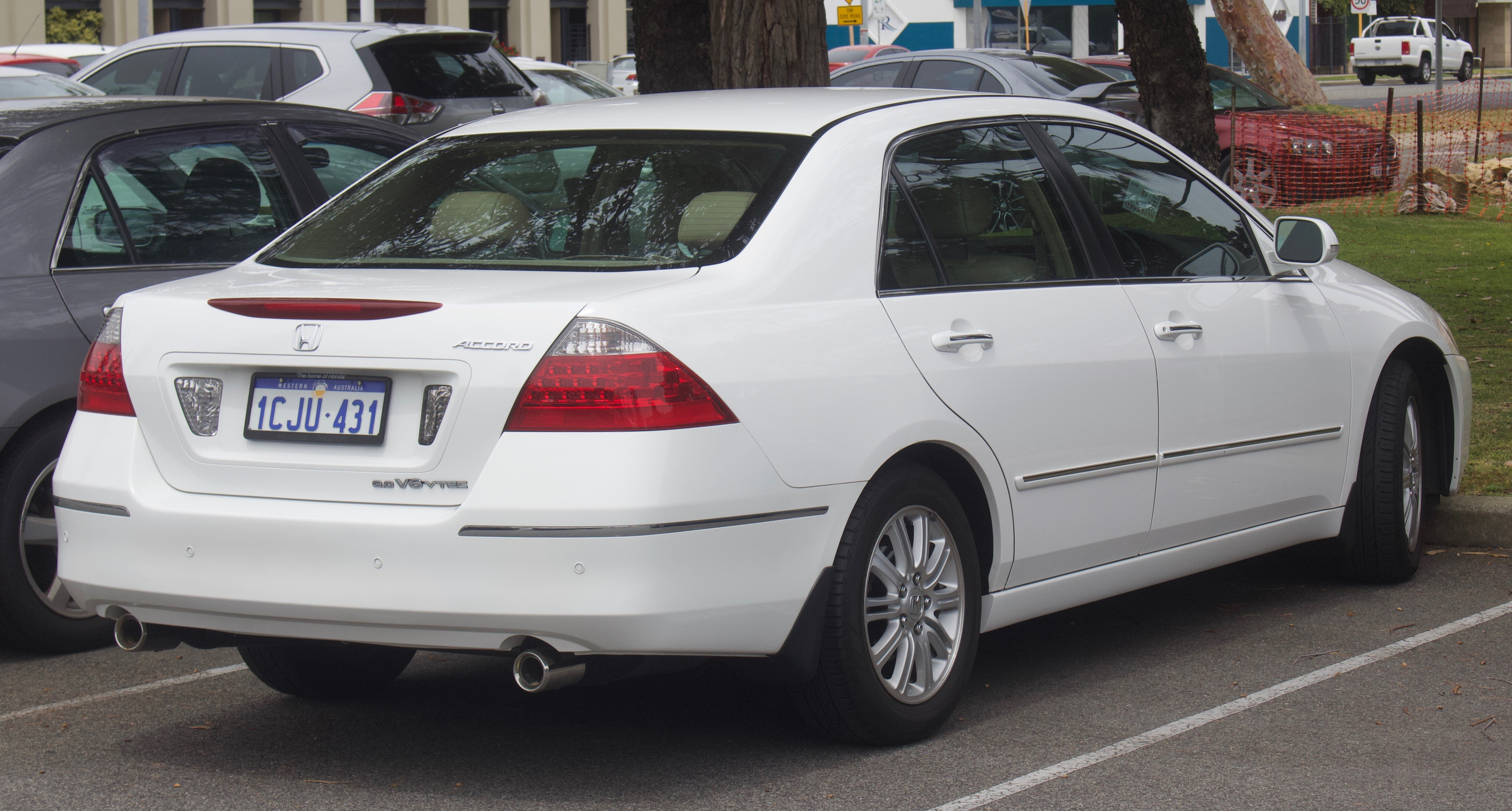
Honda Accord (North America and Asia Pacific)

The North American Accord grew in size yet again, becoming a vastly different car than its Japanese and European counterparts. This generation was available in both coupe and sedan forms, while a hybrid model was introduced in early 2005. For 2006, it was significantly updated.

This Accord was the first to use wheels with five lug nuts instead of the traditional four on 4-cylinder models. The 4-cylinder version came with 161 hp (120 kW) and 160 lb⋅ft (217 N⋅m) (166 hp (124 kW) and 161 lb⋅ft (218 N⋅m) for 2005–2007 models) K24A1 2397 cc 4-cylinder engine mated to a 5-speed automatic or 5-speed manual. The 4-cylinder engine also used a timing chain instead of a timing belt.

For 2003, Honda began to offer a more aggressive Accord Coupe, equipped with the 240 hp (179 kW) and 212 lb⋅ft (287 N⋅m) (244 hp (182 kW) and 211 lb⋅ft (286 N⋅m) for 2006–2007 models) J30A4 2997cc V6 mated to a 6-speed manual transmission borrowed from the Acura TL Type S (without a limited-slip differential). This coupe came with 17-inch wheels (that varied between the 03-05 and 06-07 models), a strut tower bar, perforated leather seating, carbon fiber dash pieces, and an upgraded 180-watt stereo system. Because of the ability to maintain activation of the VTEC system all the way through hard acceleration, the Accord EX V6 6-speed ran from 0–60 mph in 5.9 seconds according to Car and Driver, more than a second faster than the automatic version.

This model was also sold in Japan as the Honda Inspire from 2003 to 2008. In China, the model got the name Guangzhou-Honda Accord and was sold from 2003 up to December 2009.

== Eighth generation (2007) ==
=== Accord (Japan/Europe) and Spirior (China) ===
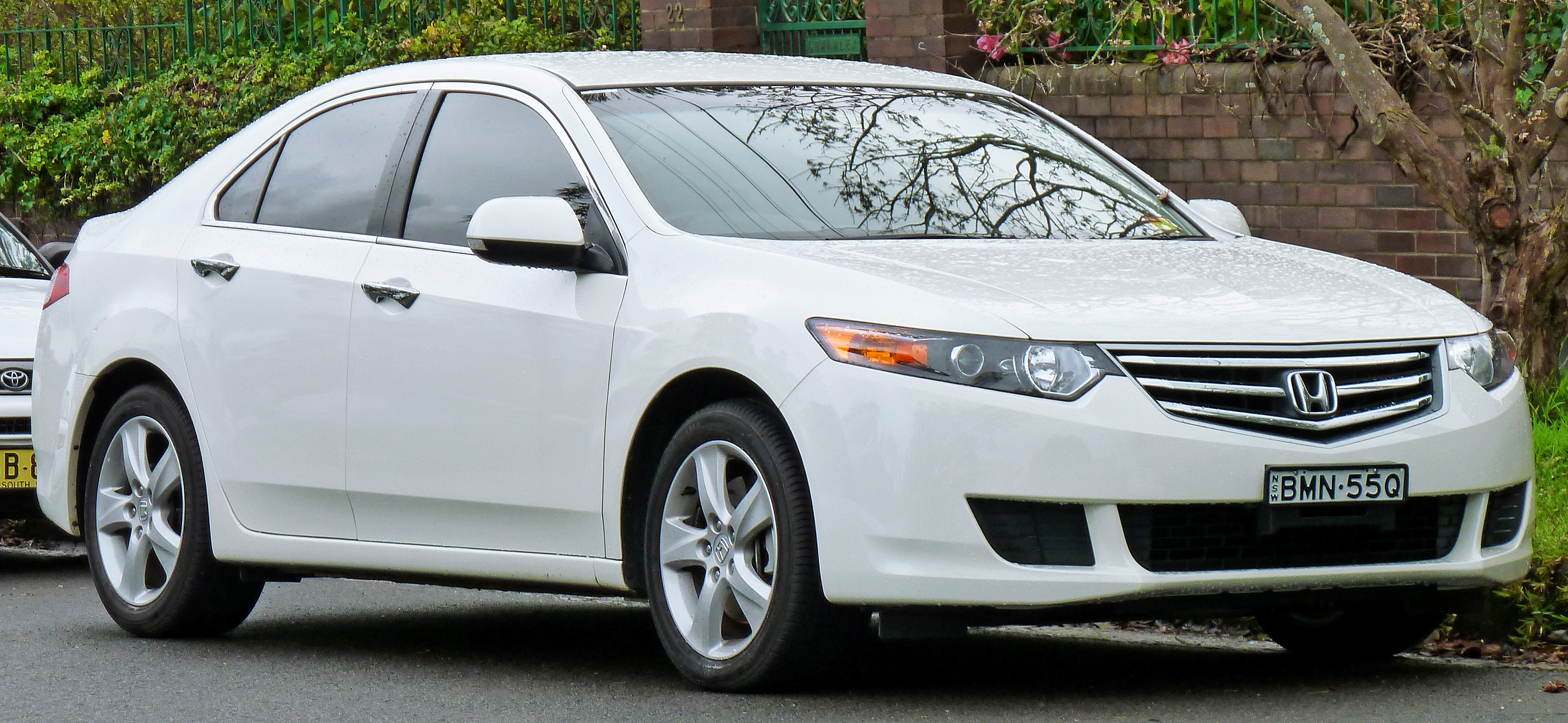
Eighth generation Accord (Japan, Europe and Australasia)

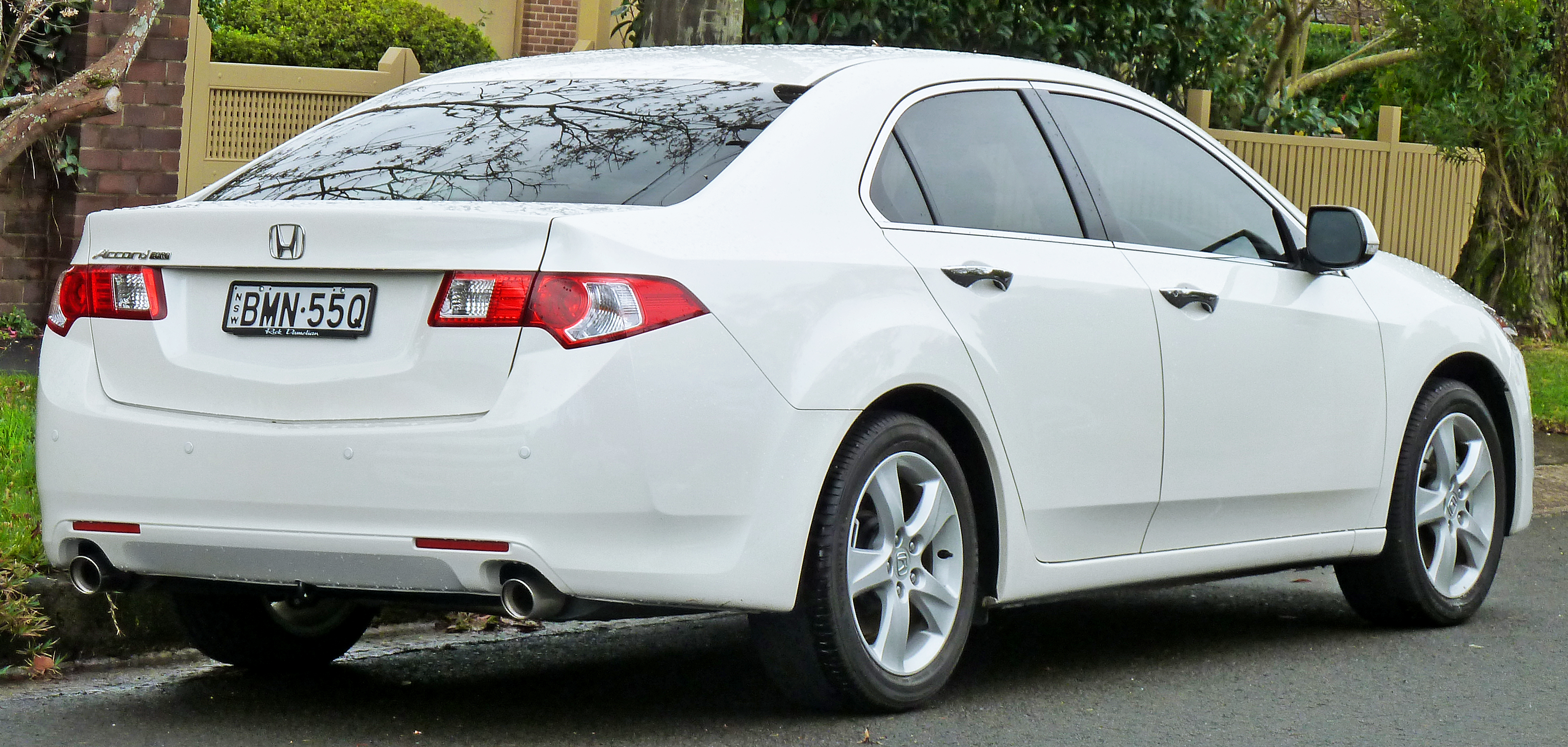
Eighth generation Accord (Japan, Europe and Australasia)

The updated Accord for the Japanese and European markets went on sale in mid 2008. It is also sold as the Accord Euro in the Australia and New Zealand markets, and as the Acura TSX in North America. It is available as both a sedan and a station wagon. In the People's Republic of China, a version of the sedan is sold as the Honda Spirior which later on developed an independent second generation. Production began in August 2009 in China, by Dongfeng Honda. Production ended at the end of February 2015 for Australia and New Zealand spec models, although sales continued in Australia until the beginning of 2016.

In Europe, the car maintained the 2.0 and 2.4 i-VTEC petrol (upped to 156 and 198 bhp respectively), whilst a new 2.2 i-DTEC diesel engine provided 147 bhp (110 kW) with 258 lb⋅ft (350 N⋅m) in standard trim levels, and 177 bhp (132 kW) with 280 lb⋅ft (380 N⋅m) in Type-S sports trim level. This allowed the Accord to go 0–100 km/h (0-62 mph) in 8.5 seconds, and still do 50 mpg on the EU Combined cycle. Sales in Europe were discontinued in 2015.

=== Accord (North America/China) and Inspire (Japan) ===
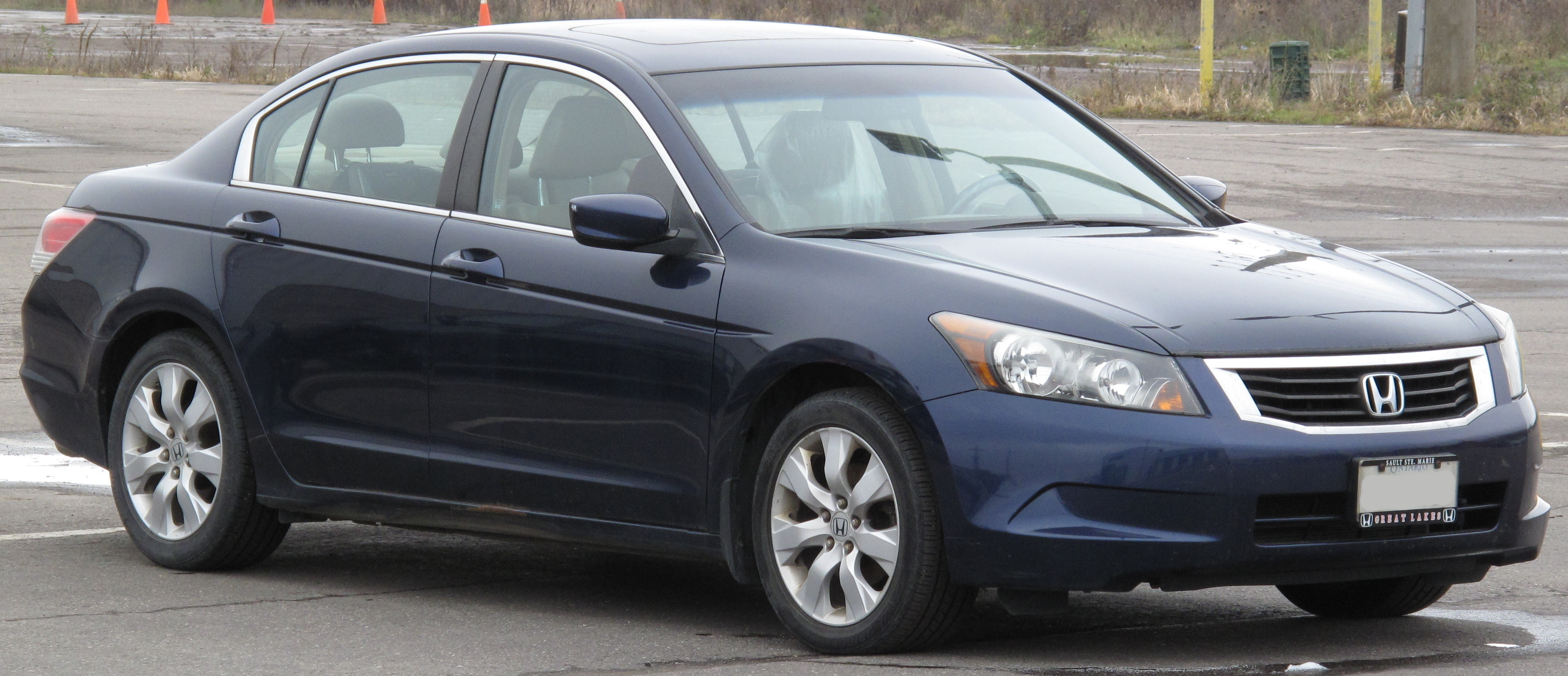
Eighth generation Accord (Canada)

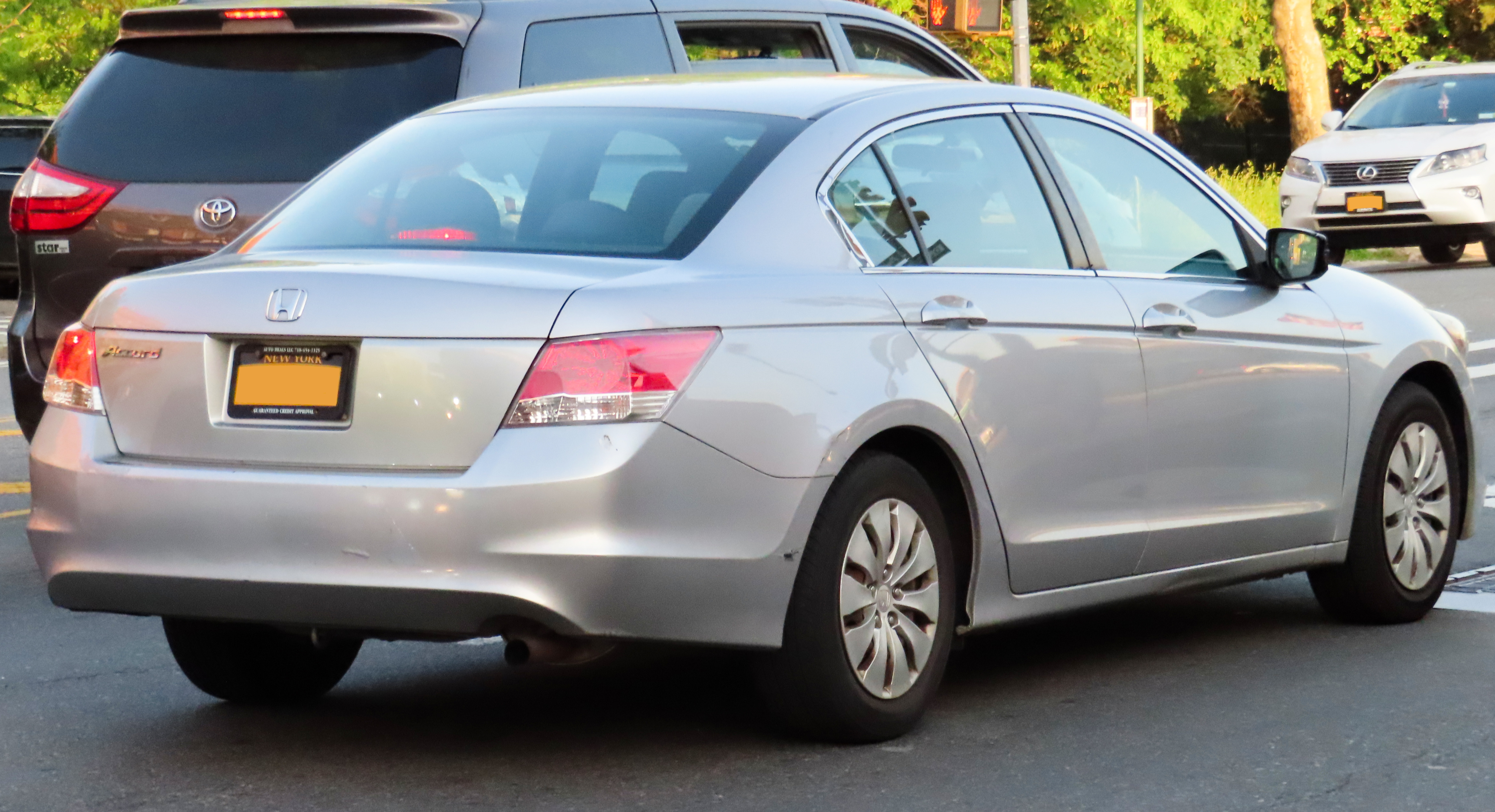
Eighth generation Accord (U.S.)

The North American version of the Accord has a different body from its Japanese counterpart. The Accord in this form was sold as the Inspire in Japan and was not sold in Europe, Turkey, Israel and North Africa. It was discontinued in Japan in September 2012. Larger than the previous model, the sedan was classified as a full-size car by EPA standards, though American Honda executive vice president John Mendel said in 2011 that Honda did not intend to build a full-size car since the trend was for smaller cars having better fuel consumption. A coupe version was available, as well as a Crosstour fastback model, which was introduced in the U.S. in 2009 for the 2010 model year. Engines include a 2.4 L 4-cylinder rated at 177 bhp (132 kW) with 161 lb⋅ft (218 N⋅m) for LX and SE sedans and 190 bhp (142 kW) with 162 lb⋅ft (220 N⋅m) for EX, EX-L and LX-S sedans and coupes; as well as a 3.5 L V6 rated at 272 bhp (203 kW) with 254 lb⋅ft (344 N⋅m).

In Australia, New Zealand, Sri Lanka, Thailand, Indonesia, and Singapore, this car which was assembled in Thailand, was sold as the Accord in left or right-hand-drive forms. In Malaysia and India, this Accord model was locally assembled. In Hong Kong, this car was made in Japan and sold as the Accord, and in Taiwan, the Accord was locally assembled. In China, Guangqi Honda also makes this vehicle with 2.0 L, 2.4 L and 3.5 L engines. Guangqi began making the Accord Crosstour in 2010.

In Malaysia, the eighth-generation was also rebadged as the Proton Perdana from December 2013 and was used by government officials. It was assembled at the Honda-DRB plant in HICOM Industrial Park Pegoh, Alor Gajah, Melaka.

== Ninth generation (2012) ==
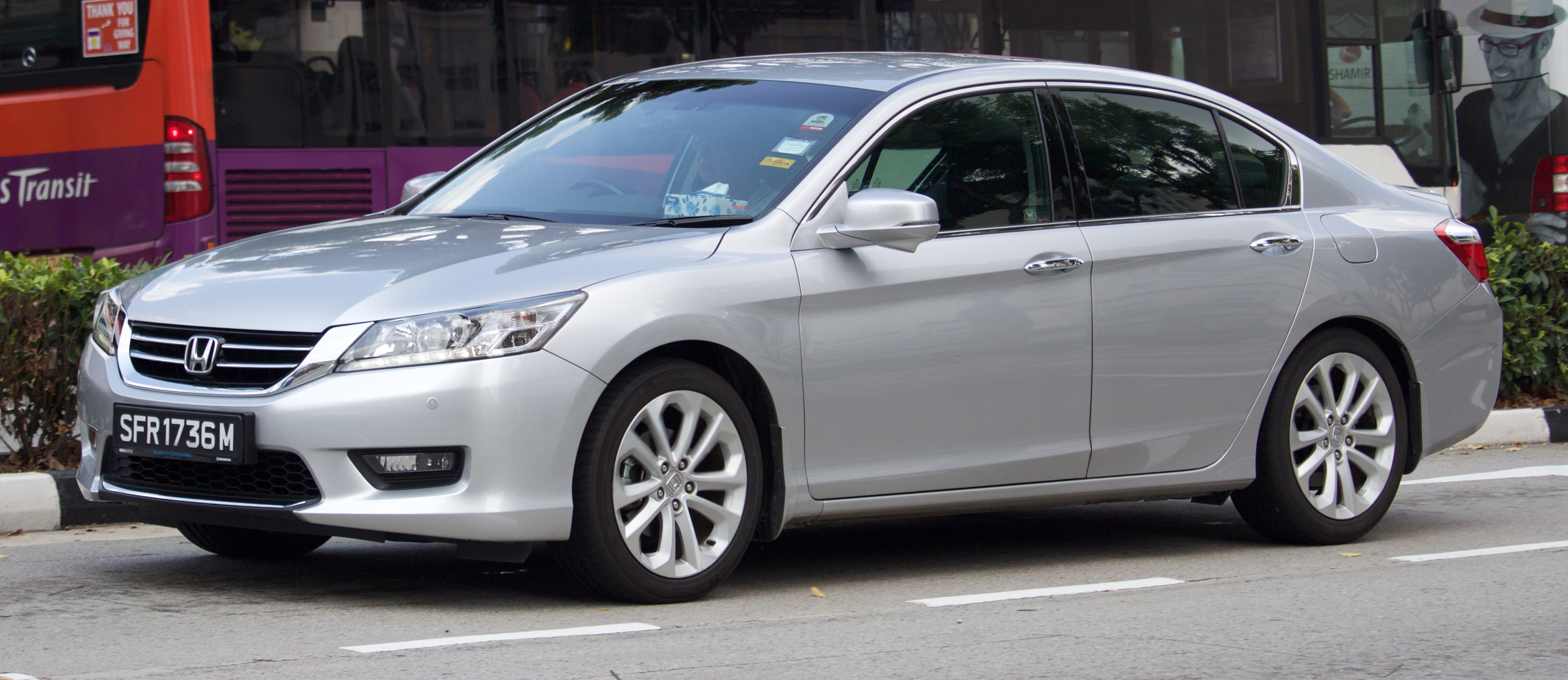
Honda Accord 2.4 i-VTEC (Singapore)

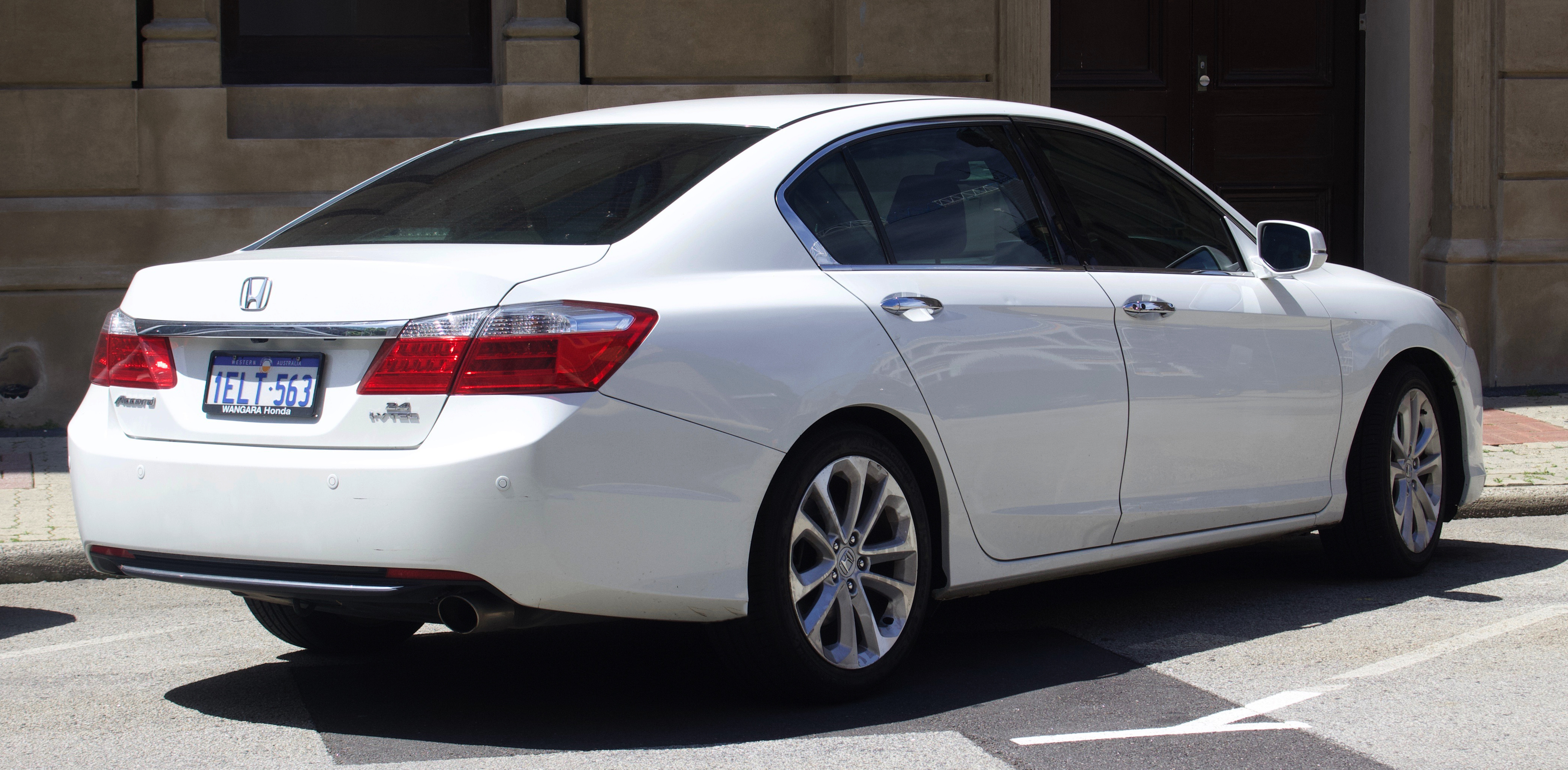
Honda Accord VTi-L (Australia)

For the ninth-generation Accord, Honda appointed Shoji Matsui, who served as an engineer on the Accord platform from 1985 to 1996, as the lead project manager. It is the first Honda vehicle to be completely developed under the administration of Honda CEO Takanobu Ito.

Honda revealed the Accord Coupe Concept at the January 2012 North American International Auto Show in Detroit. In August 2012, the company released initial details pertaining to the 2013 Accord sedan, and production versions of both the sedan and coupe were fully unveiled in early September 2012. The Accord sedan went on sale on 19 September 2012, in the United States, with the coupe following on 15 October 2012. Corresponding release dates in Canada for the sedan and coupe models are 24 September 2012, and 1 November 2012, respectively. In February 2013, the Accord was scheduled to enter the Russian market. In June 2013, the Accord hybrid and plug-in hybrid were introduced to the Japanese market, with the discontinuation of the Honda Inspire, serving as Honda's large sedan and one level below the Honda Legend.

From 2014, Honda began exporting the Accord from China to the Middle East, Africa, members of Commonwealth of Independent States (CIS), and others. However, from 2017 onwards, Accords that are sold in the Middle Eastern markets are now sourced from the Marysville Auto Plant in Ohio.

While replaced by the tenth-generation in late 2017, the ninth-generation Accord continued to be built in Thailand until 2019 in most right-hand-drive markets.

== Tenth generation (2017) ==
Tenth generation
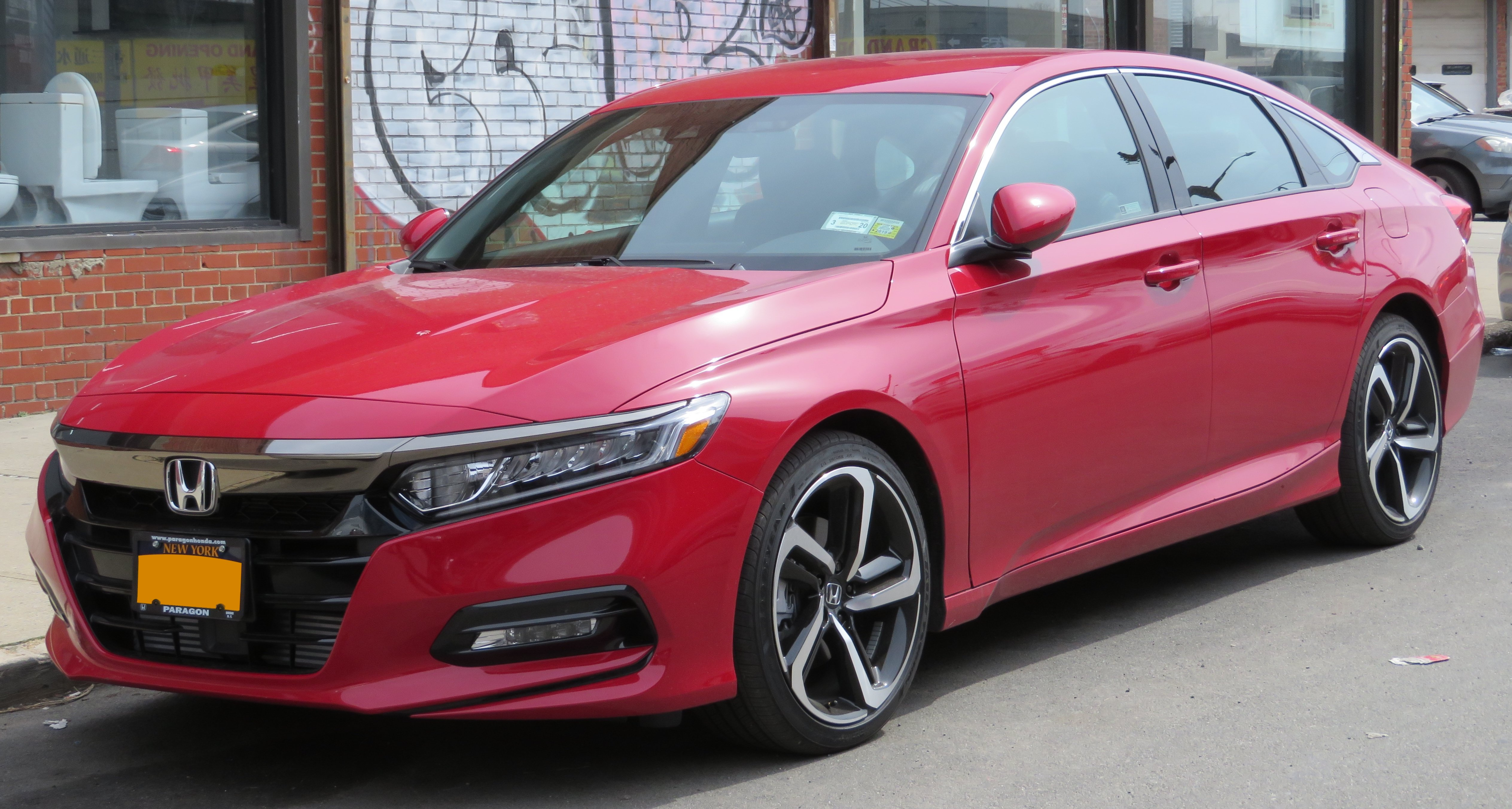
- 2018 Accord Sport (pre-facelift, US)

Overview
- Model code: CV1; CV2; CV3
- Also called: Honda Inspire (China; Dongfeng Honda)
- Production: September 2017 – December 2022 (North America); April 2018 – 2023 (China); March 2019 – 2023 (Thailand); February 2020 – 2024 (Malaysia)
- Model years: 2018–2022
- Assembly: United States: Marysville, Ohio (Marysville Auto Plant); China: Guangzhou (Guangqi Honda); Wuhan (Dongfeng Honda, Inspire); Thailand: Prachinburi (Honda Automobile (Thailand)); Malaysia: Alor Gajah, Melaka (Honda Malaysia Sdn Bhd)
- Designer: Tetsuji Morikawa (exterior, 2015); Yosuke Shimizu (interior, 2015)

Body and chassis
- Class: Mid-size car (D)
- Body style: 4-door sedan
- Platform: CCA

Powertrain
- Engine: Petrol: 1.5 L L15BE / L15BG I4 (turbo); 2.0 L K20C4 I4 (turbo); Petrol hybrid: 2.0 L LFA1/LFB1 PGM-FI DOHC i-VTEC I4 + 2 electric motors
- Transmission: 6-speed manual (1.5T/2.0T, 2018-2020 Sport trim only); CVT (1.5T); 10-speed Sequential SportShift automatic (2.0T); e-CVT (Hybrid)
- Hybrid drivetrain: Power-split hybrid (Accord e:HEV)

Dimensions
- Wheelbase: 2,830 mm (111.4 in)
- Length: 4,900 mm (192.9 in)
- Width: 1,860 mm (73.2 in)
- Height: 1,450 mm (57.1 in)
- Curb weight: 1,420–1,555 kg (3,131–3,428 lb)

Chronology
- Predecessor: Honda Accord (ninth generation)

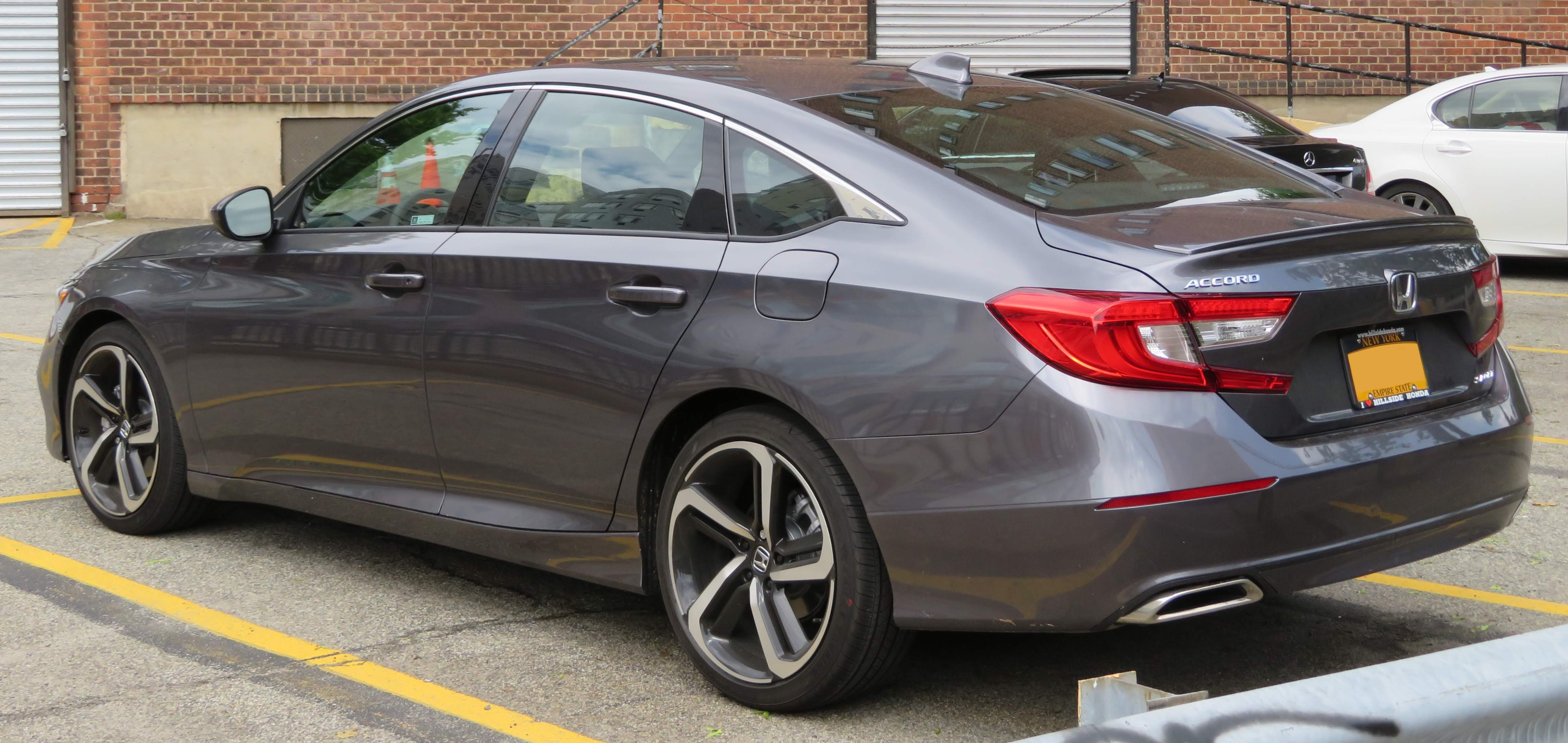
Rear view

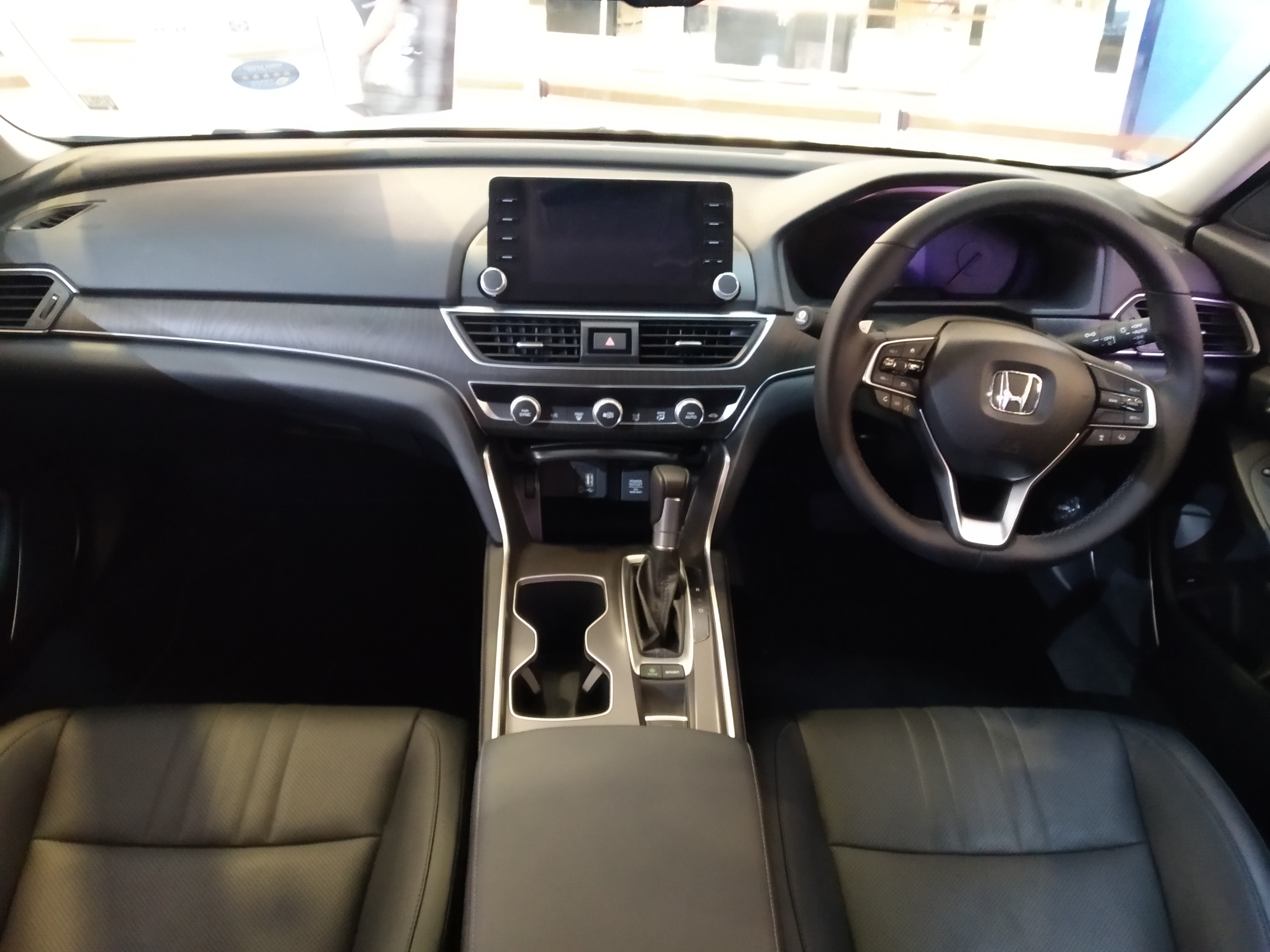
Interior

The tenth-generation Accord was unveiled on 14 July 2017. Production began on 18 September 2017 and sales began on 18 October 2017 in the United States as a 2018 model. The tenth-generation Accord was exclusively offered as a four-door sedan, the coupe variant being discontinued due to low sales.

A base 1.5-litre VTEC turbo four-cylinder engine with available active grille shutters produces 143 kW (192 hp; 195 PS) and 260 N⋅m (192 lbf⋅ft) of torque, mated to a 6-speed manual or continuously variable transmission (CVT). The optional 2.0-litre VTEC turbo four-cylinder engine, which replaced the V6 engine option, was available beginning December 2017. This engine is based on the engine in the Civic Type R, but with a smaller turbocharger, different pistons and camshafts, and the addition of a pair of balance shafts. The engine, which produced 188 kW (252 hp; 255 PS) and 370 N⋅m (273 lbf⋅ft) of torque is mated to a 6-speed manual or 10-speed automatic transmission. The 10-speed automatic is 22 lb (10 kg) lighter than the previous 6-speed.

The Accord Hybrid went on sale in March 2018. The 1.3 kWh lithium-ion battery was reduced in physical size and moved from the boot to under the rear seat. The generator and propulsion motor permanent magnets no longer contain rare-earth heavy metals.

To save weight, the front subframe, front control arms, bonnet, front and rear bumpers are constructed of aluminum, which were previously reserved for past hybrid models. Approximately 57% of the body was made from high strength steel including 29% ultra-high-strength hot stamped 980-1500 MPa grades. Structural adhesives are employed for the first time on the Accord with 115 ft of adhesive bonding applied to the body. The body in white (BIW) is 42 pounds (19 kg) lighter, with improved structural rigidity.

At Virginia International Raceway, Car and Driver tested the 2.0-litre, 6-speed manual Accord with 19" touring all-season tyres, it covered the 4.1-mile (6.6 km) course in 3:18.4 minutes.

=== Other markets ===
The ASEAN (Southeast Asian) market tenth generation Accord debuted on 28 November 2018 at the Thailand International Motor Expo. It was launched in Thailand on 19 March 2019, in Singapore on 5 July 2019, in Indonesia on 18 July 2019 at the 27th Gaikindo Indonesia International Auto Show, in Australia on 28 November 2019 and in Malaysia on 26 February 2020. In Thailand, Honda received over 4,000 orders for the Accord within two months after prices were released in mid-May, with over 50% of the bookings for the hybrid variant.

The tenth-generation Accord debuted for the Japanese domestic market at the 46th Tokyo Motor Show through October to November 2019 and went on sale in Japan on 21 February 2020 and was imported from Thailand.

The tenth-generation Honda Accord was unveiled in Egypt in 2018, and featured two trims: The LX trim, and the EX trim, both using the 1.5L L15BE engine with a power output of 188 hp and 260 N⋅m (192 lb⋅ft) of torque. None of the trims featured Honda Sensing. As of 2024, the Honda Accord only comes in one trim, the EX, which features Honda LaneWatch.

=== 2020 facelift ===
In 2020 for the 2021 model year, the Accord receives a minor facelift, including a revised grille, new wheel designs on LX, EX-L, & Touring trims, and brighter LED headlights. A Sport SE trim replaces the EX 1.5T, while the manual transmission has been discontinued due to poor sales. Apple CarPlay and Android Auto touchscreen integration became standard on all models, with wireless functionality on EX-L and higher trim levels. Also the 2.0T which was available on the EX-L for 2018-2020 was cut and the EX-L is only standard with the 1.5T while the Sport keeps the 2.0T as an option and the 2.0T is standard on the TOURING. With discontinuation of Honda Legend in 2021, the Accord is once again the largest Honda sedan since 1985.

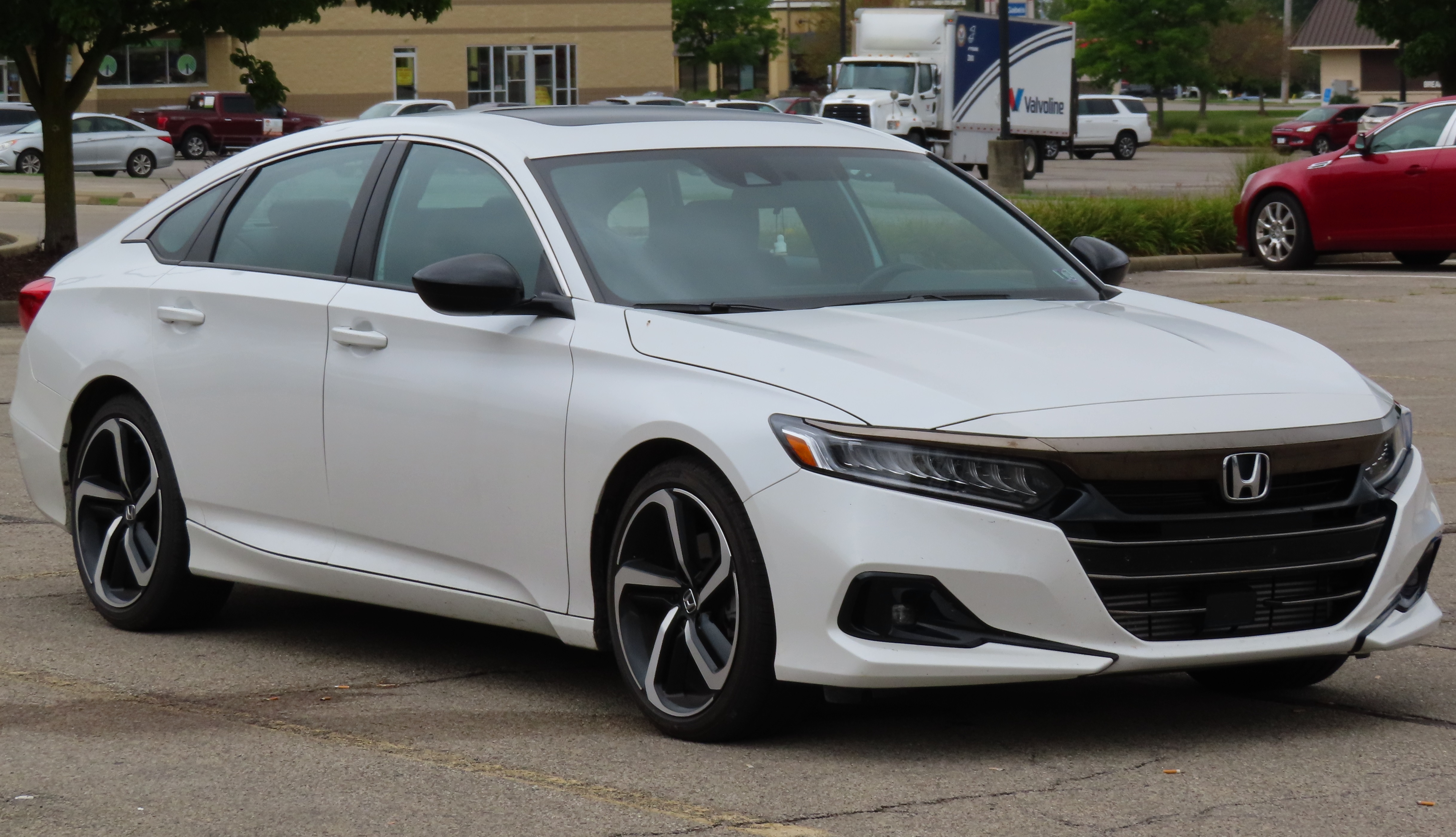
2021 Accord Sport (facelift)

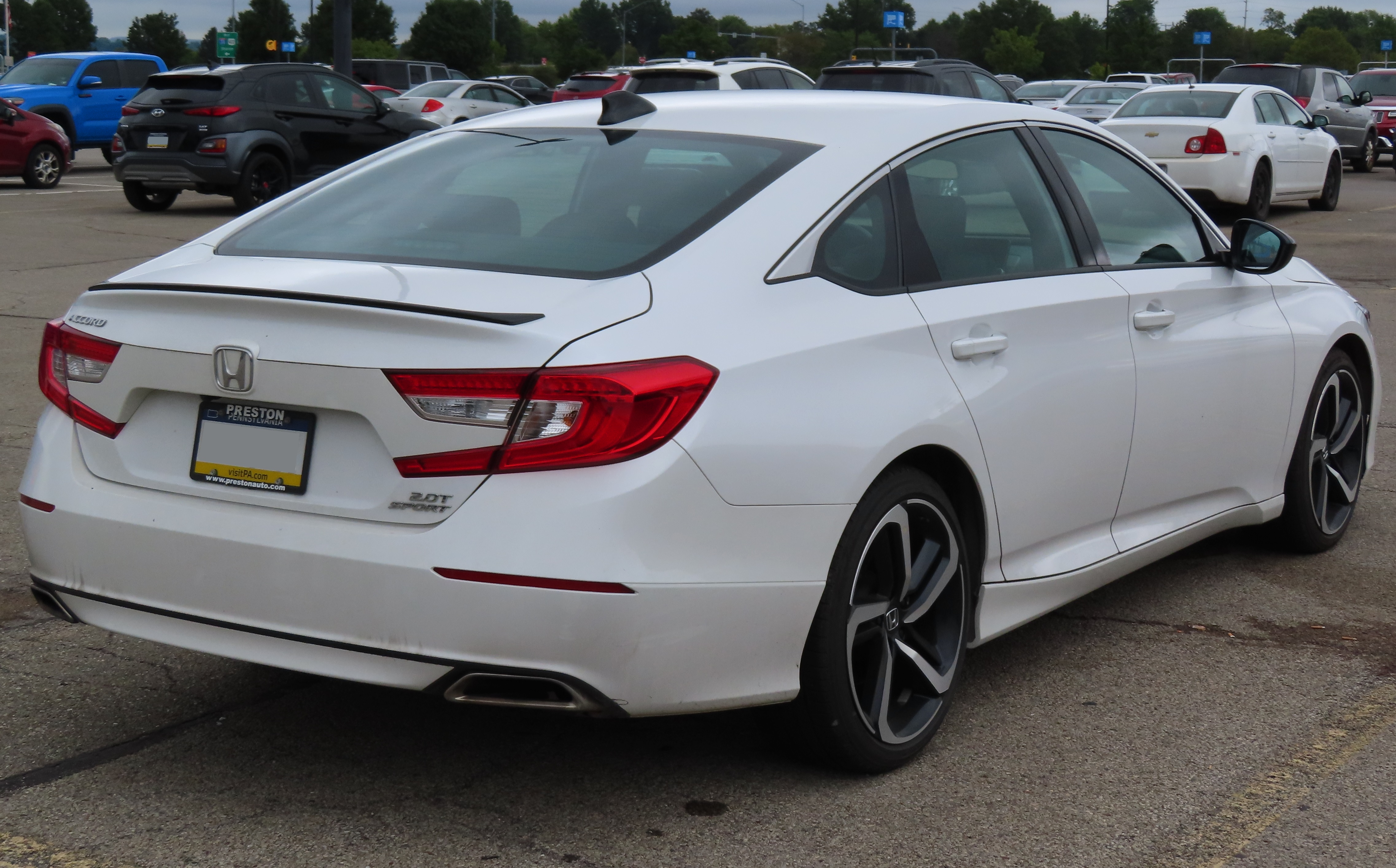
2021 Accord Sport (facelift)

=== Engines ===
Engine	Chassis code	Horsepower	Torque
1.5 L L15BE I4 turbo petrol	CV1	192 hp (143 kW; 195 PS) at 5,500 rpm	192 lb⋅ft (260 N⋅m) at 1,600-5,000 rpm
1.5 L L15BG I4 turbo petrol	CV1	187 hp (139 kW; 190 PS) at 5,500 rpm	179 lb⋅ft (243 N⋅m) at 1,500-5,000 rpm
2.0 L K20C4 I4 turbo petrol	CV2	252 hp (188 kW; 255 PS) at 6,500 rpm	273 lb⋅ft (370 N⋅m) at 1,500-4,000 rpm
2.0 L LFA1 / LFB1 I4 hybrid petrol	CV3	143 hp (107 kW; 145 PS) at 6,200 rpm (engine); 181 hp (135 kW; 184 PS) at 5,000-6,000 rpm (electric motor); 212 hp (158 kW; 215 PS) (combined)	129 lb⋅ft (175 N⋅m) at 3,500 rpm (engine); 232 lb⋅ft (315 N⋅m) at 0–2,000 rpm (electric motor)

=== Safety ===
NHTSA 2018 Accord:
Overall:	5/5 stars
Frontal Driver:	5/5 stars
Frontal Passenger:	5/5 stars
Side Driver:	5/5 stars
Side Passenger:	5/5 stars
Side Pole Driver:	5/5 stars
Rollover:	/ 9.3%

The 2019 Accord received the 2019 IIHS Top Safety Pick:

- Small overlap front: driver-side - Good (vehicle structure rated "Good").
- Small overlap front: passenger-side - Good (vehicle structure rated "Good").
- Moderate overlap front - Good.
- Side - Good.
- Roof strength - Good.
- Head restraints and seats - Good.
- Front crash prevention: vehicle-to-vehicle - Superior.
- Front crash prevention: vehicle-to-pedestrian - Advanced.
- Headlights - Acceptable for every trim except for Touring trim (Marginal).
- Child seat LATCH ease of use - Good+ (extra LATCH positions).

ASEAN NCAP test results Honda Accord (2019)
Test	Points
Overall:	5 /5 stars
Adult occupant:	49.07
Child occupant:	23.28
Safety assist:	19.44

== Eleventh generation (2023) ==
Eleventh generation
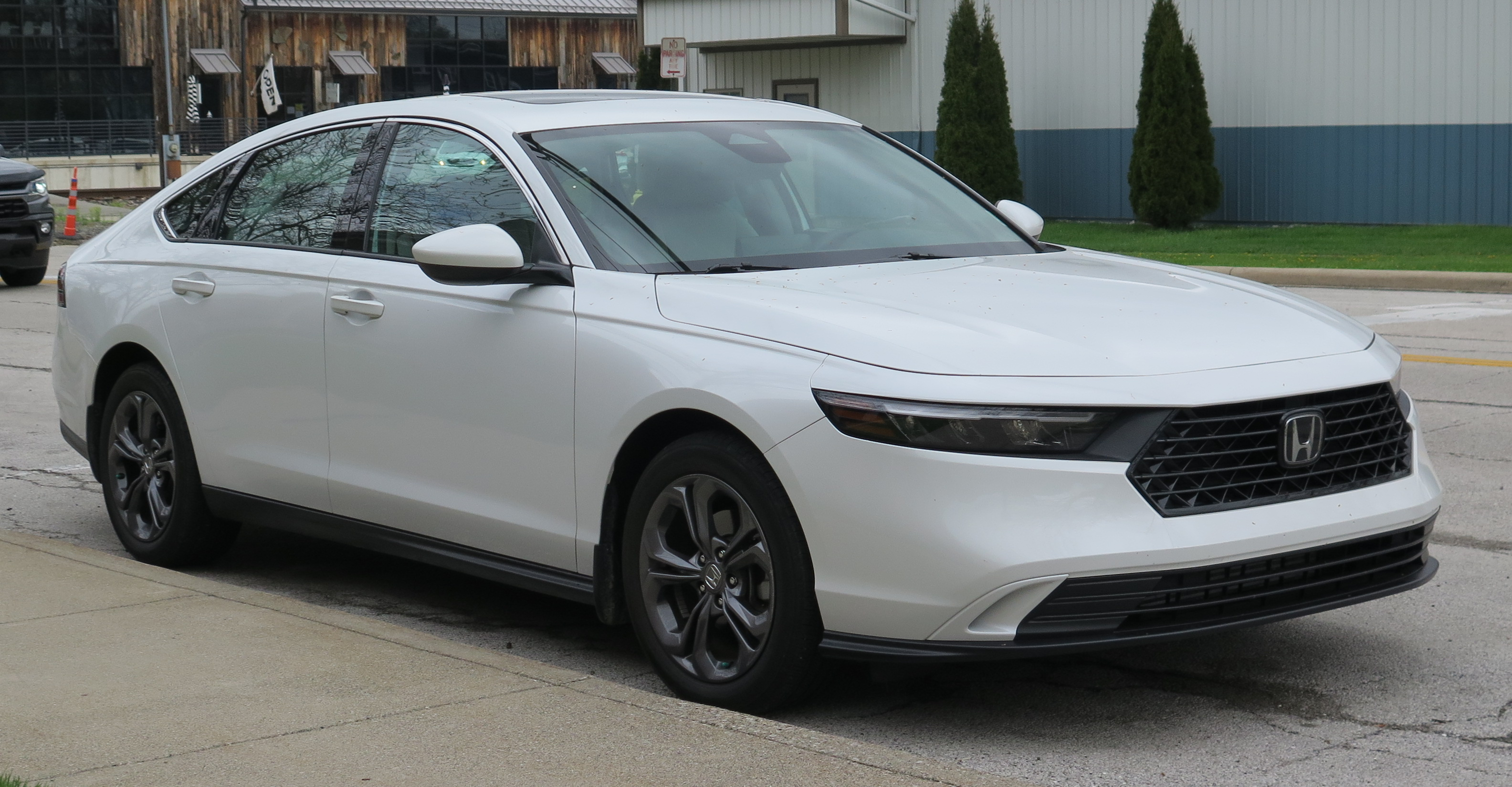
- 2023 Honda Accord EX (US)

Overview
- Model code: CY1 (1.5 L); CY2 (hybrid)
- Also called: Honda Inspire (China; Dongfeng Honda)
- Production: January 2023 – present
- Model years: 2023–present
- Assembly: United States: Marysville, Ohio (Marysville Auto Plant); China: Guangzhou (GAC Honda); Wuhan (Dongfeng Honda, Inspire); Thailand: Prachinburi
- Designer: Takuya Miyazawa (2020)

Body and chassis
- Class: Mid-size car (D)
- Body style: 4-door sedan
- Platform: Honda HA

Powertrain
- Engine: Petrol: 1.5 L L15BE turbo I4 (CY1); Petrol hybrid: 2.0 L LFC5 I4 (CY2); Petrol plug-in hybrid: 2.0 L LFB-19 I4 (CY3, China)
- Transmission: CVT (1.5 L); e-CVT (hybrid)
- Hybrid drivetrain: Power-split hybrid

Dimensions
- Wheelbase: 2,830 mm (111.4 in)
- Length: 4,970 mm (195.7 in)
- Width: 1,860 mm (73.2 in)
- Height: 1,450 mm (57.1 in)
- Curb weight: 1,580 kg (3,480 lb) (hybrid)

The eleventh-generation Accord was unveiled on 10 November 2022 to be sold for the 2023 model year.

By lengthening the overhangs, the exterior of the eleventh-generation Accord is longer than the previous model. This change is to accommodate the new hybrid powertrain system. Wheelbase and height is unchanged, although the car is 2 mm (0.1 in) wider than before.

The same 1.5-litre four-cylinder turbocharged petrol engine from the previous generation is used, with updates to feature improved VTEC variable valve lift technology, an upgraded direct injection system, a new cold-active catalyst, a high-rigidity crankshaft, and a revised oil pan to reduce engine noise. The power output is rated at 192 hp (143 kW; 195 PS) with 192 lb⋅ft (260 N⋅m) of torque. The model is also equipped with a revised continuously variable transmission, which Honda claims to be quieter and better performing. The turbocharged 2.0-liter four-cylinder petrol engine has been dropped from the line-up.

For the eleventh-generation Accord, Honda also released a new 12.3-inch infotainment system that runs on the Android Automotive operating system. This new screen has been dubbed "Honda's largest screen yet," by American Honda, although Honda offers vehicles with bigger systems in other markets, such as the Honda e.

The eleventh-generation Accord will not be available in Malaysia due to declining sales of the previous generation.

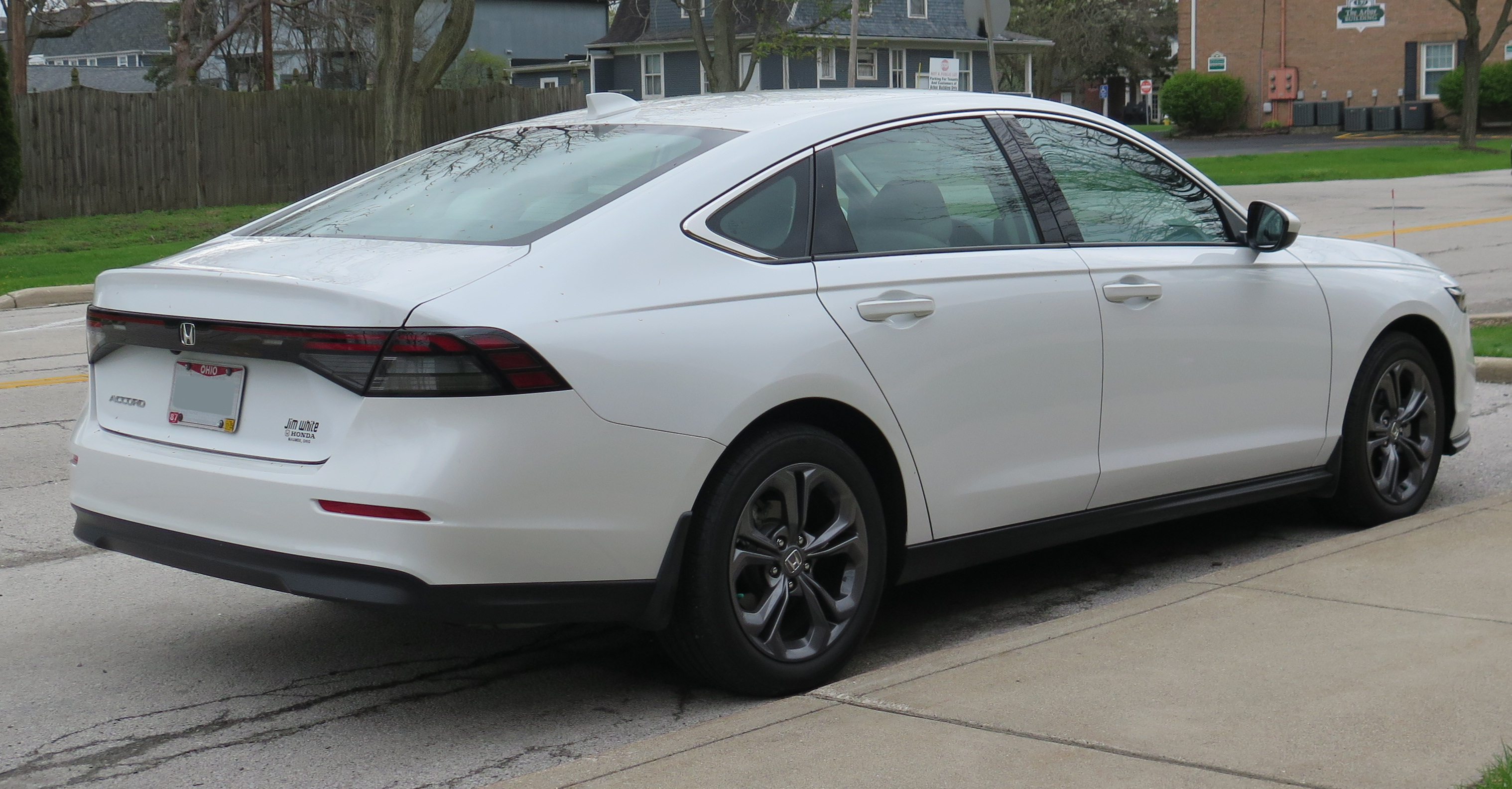
Rear view

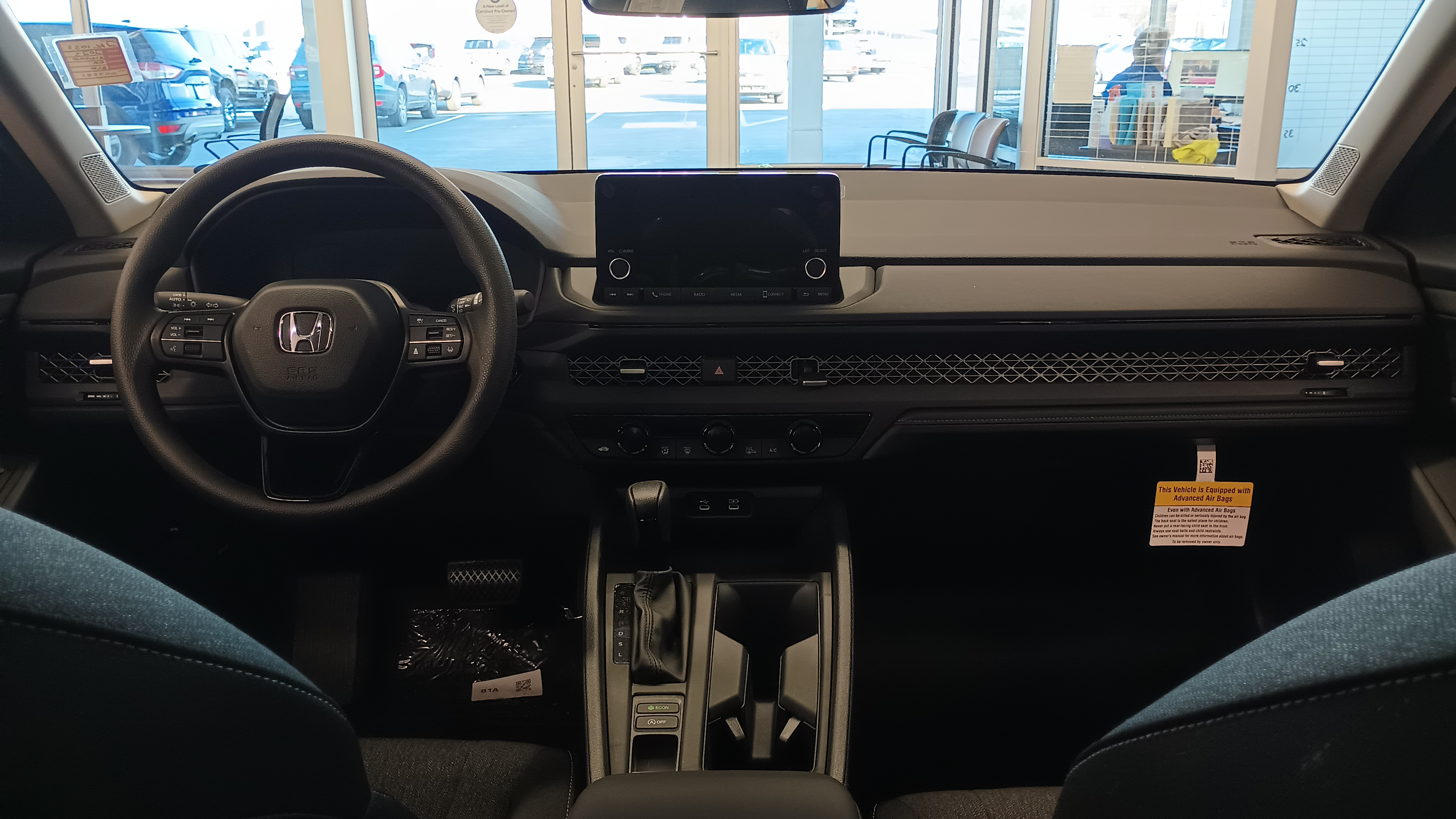
Interior (Americas)

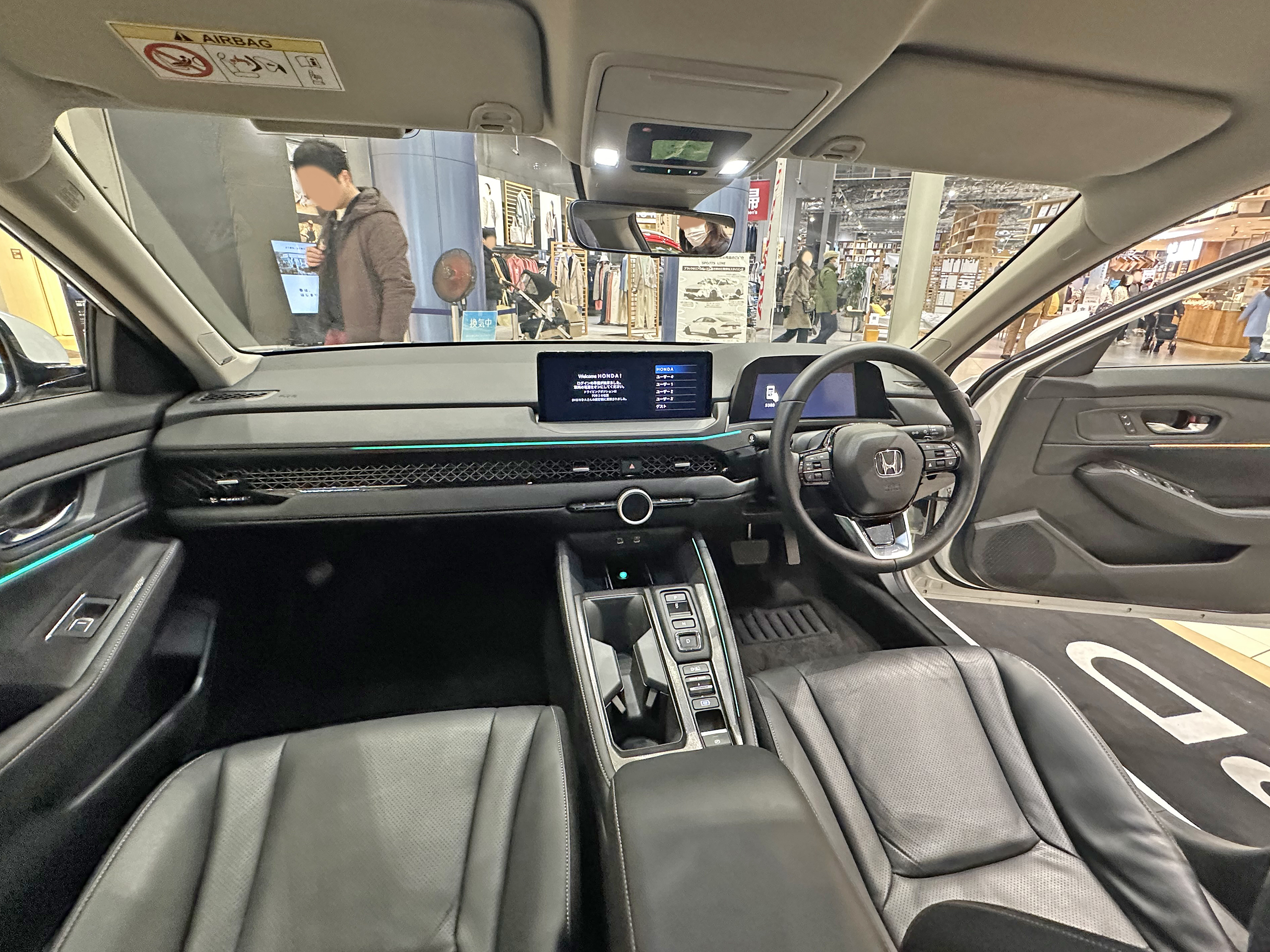
Interior (Asia)

=== Markets ===
==== North America ====
For the US market, the 1.5-litre turbo engine is offered in LX and EX trim levels, while the hybrid option is available for Sport, EX-L, Sport-L and Touring trim levels. Honda expects the hybrid variant to account for 50 percent of the Accord's sales. January thru December 2024 more than 50% of Accord sales were Hybrid sales.

Honda released the 2025 Accord on September 16, 2024, for the 2025 model year, the EX trim was replaced by the SE trim that features blacked-out exterior elements.

Honda released the 2026 Accord on December 18, 2025, the design is a carryover from 2025. The LX & SE trims gain a larger 9 inch touchscreen, the “SE” trim gains larger 19 inch rims from the Sport Hybrid, & now all trims come standard with wireless Apple CarPlay and Android Auto with the addition of a wireless charging pad.

==== China ====
The eleventh-generation Accord in China has two versions, the GAC Honda version marketed as the Accord (Chinese: 雅阁; pinyin: yǎ gé) launched on 20 May 2023, and the Dongfeng Honda version marketed as the Inspire (Chinese: 英仕派; pinyin: yīng shì pài) launched on 3 July 2023. Both versions of Accord have the same powertrain, which are the 1.5-litre turbo petrol engine marketed as "260", and a plug-in hybrid version replacing the e:HEV version marketed as e:PHEV using a 2.0-litre petrol engine.

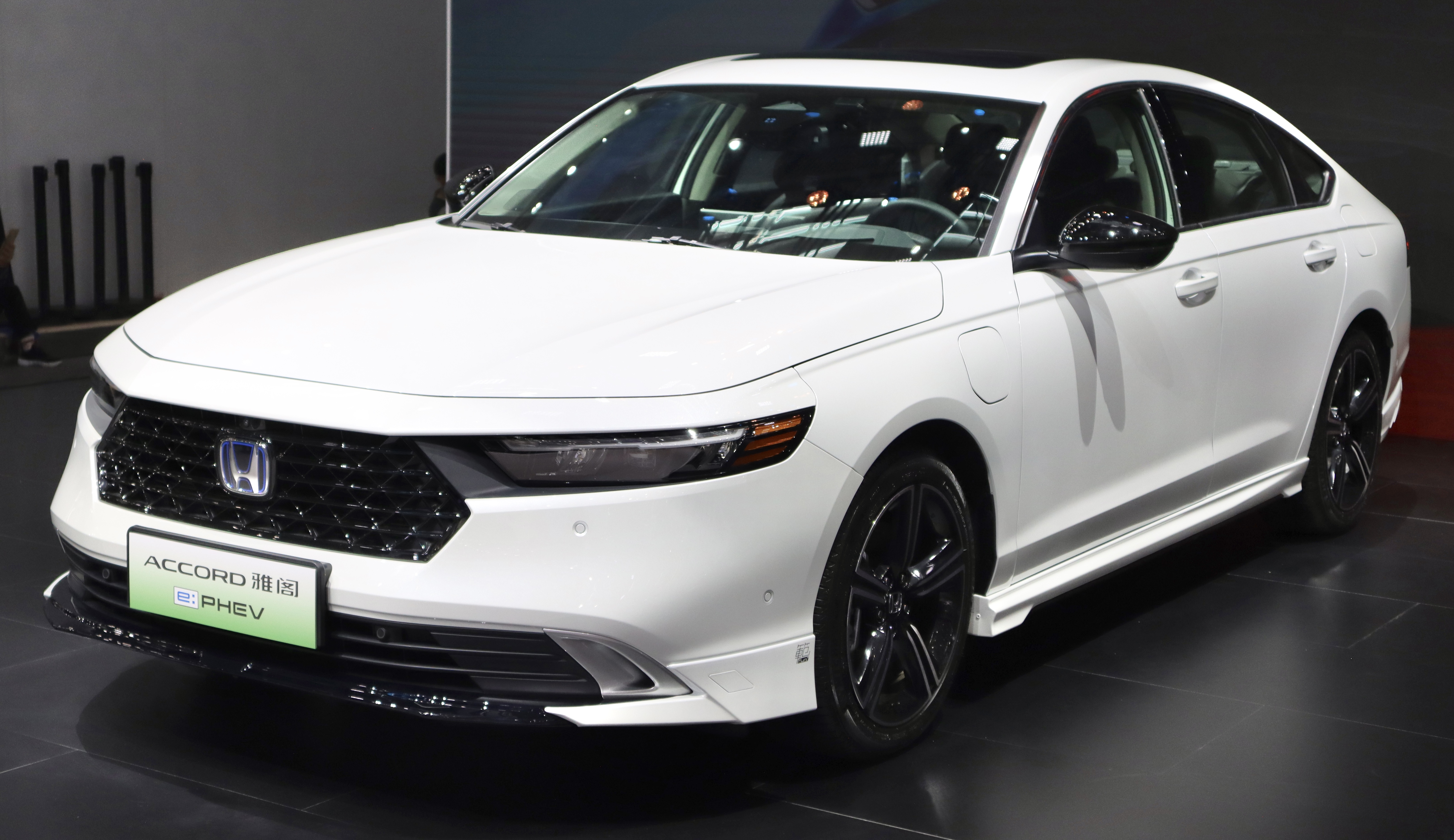
2023 GAC-Honda Accord e:PHEV

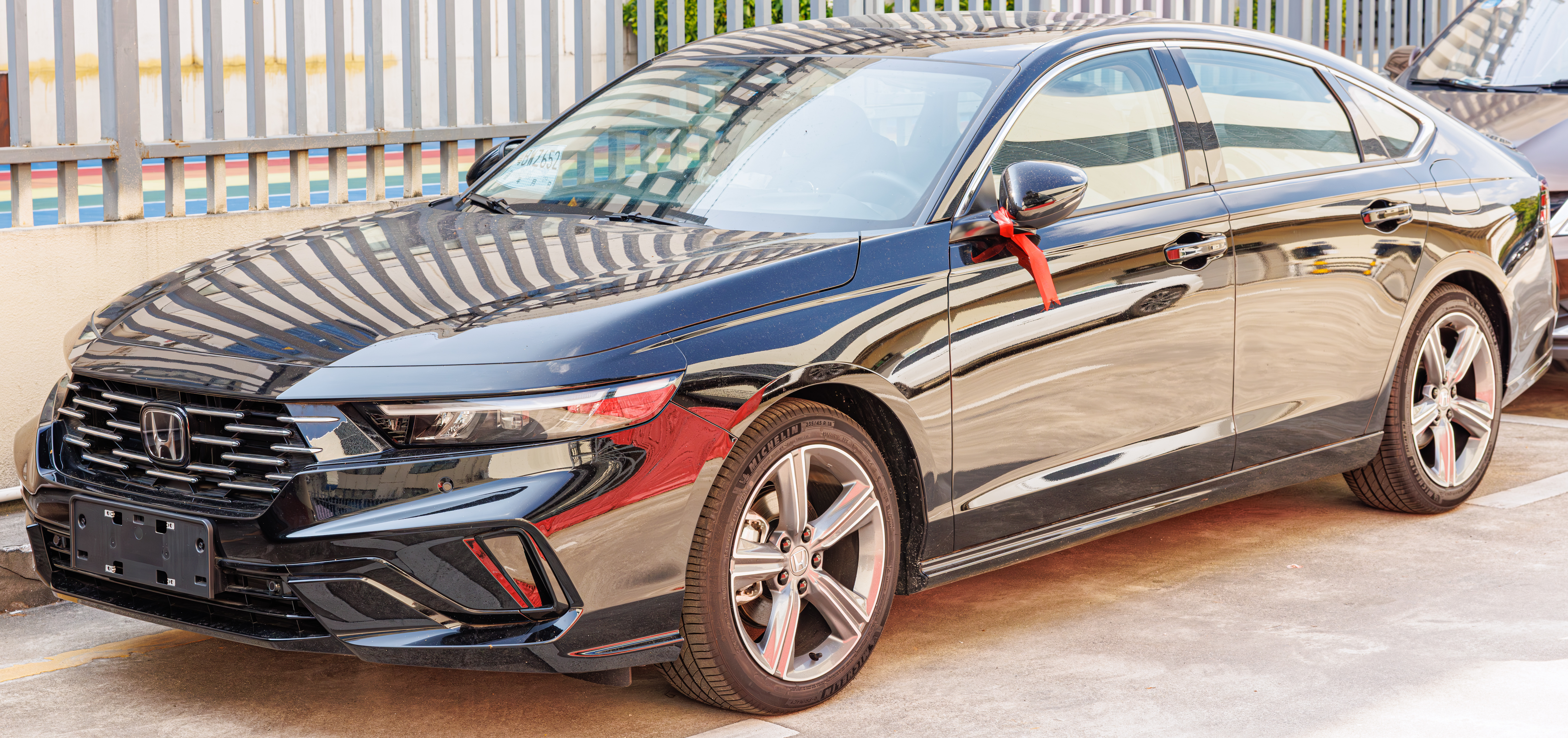
2025 GAC-Honda Accord (Facelift)

==== Middle East ====
The eleventh-generation Accord was launched in the Middle East on 23 July 2023. It is powered by the 1.5-litre turbocharged petrol and 2.0-litre e:HEV petrol hybrid powertrains. The 1.5L has three variants; LX, EX, and EXL, while 2.0L e:HEV has two variants; Sport and EXL.

==== Mexico ====
The eleventh-generation Accord was launched in Mexico on 25 July 2023 with two grades: Prime and Touring. The former grade uses a 1.5-litre turbocharged petrol and the latter grade uses a 2.0-litre e:HEV petrol hybrid.

==== Japan ====
The eleventh-generation Accord debuted in Japan on 20 September 2023 in the sole 2.0 e:HEV variant. The JDM Accord has the North American exterior styling but with the interior based on the Chinese market Accord. The Honda Sensing 360 is optional.

The eleventh-generation Accord received a minor facelift on 30 July 2026, featuring a revised front grille area and body-coloured headlight garnishes and lower garnishes. The turn signal lights, which were originally amber, now been replaced with clear turn signals. The body-coloured grille is available exclusively for the metallic blue color, while the grille for the other colours remains black.

==== Thailand ====
The eleventh-generation Accord debuted in Thailand on 29 September 2023 with pricing released the next month. In Thailand, three grades are available: E, EL and RS. All variants are powered by a 2.0 e:HEV petrol hybrid powertrain.

==== Indonesia ====
The eleventh-generation Accord was launched in Indonesia on 7 December 2023 in a sole RS e:HEV variant.

==== Australia ====
The eleventh-generation Accord was launched in Australia on 6 May 2024 in a sole RS e:HEV variant.

==== Singapore ====
The eleventh-generation Accord was launched at the Singapore Motor Show 2025 on 16 January 2025 in a sole RS e:HEV variant, equipped with a 2.0 litre engine, delivering up to 181bhp and 335Nm of torque.

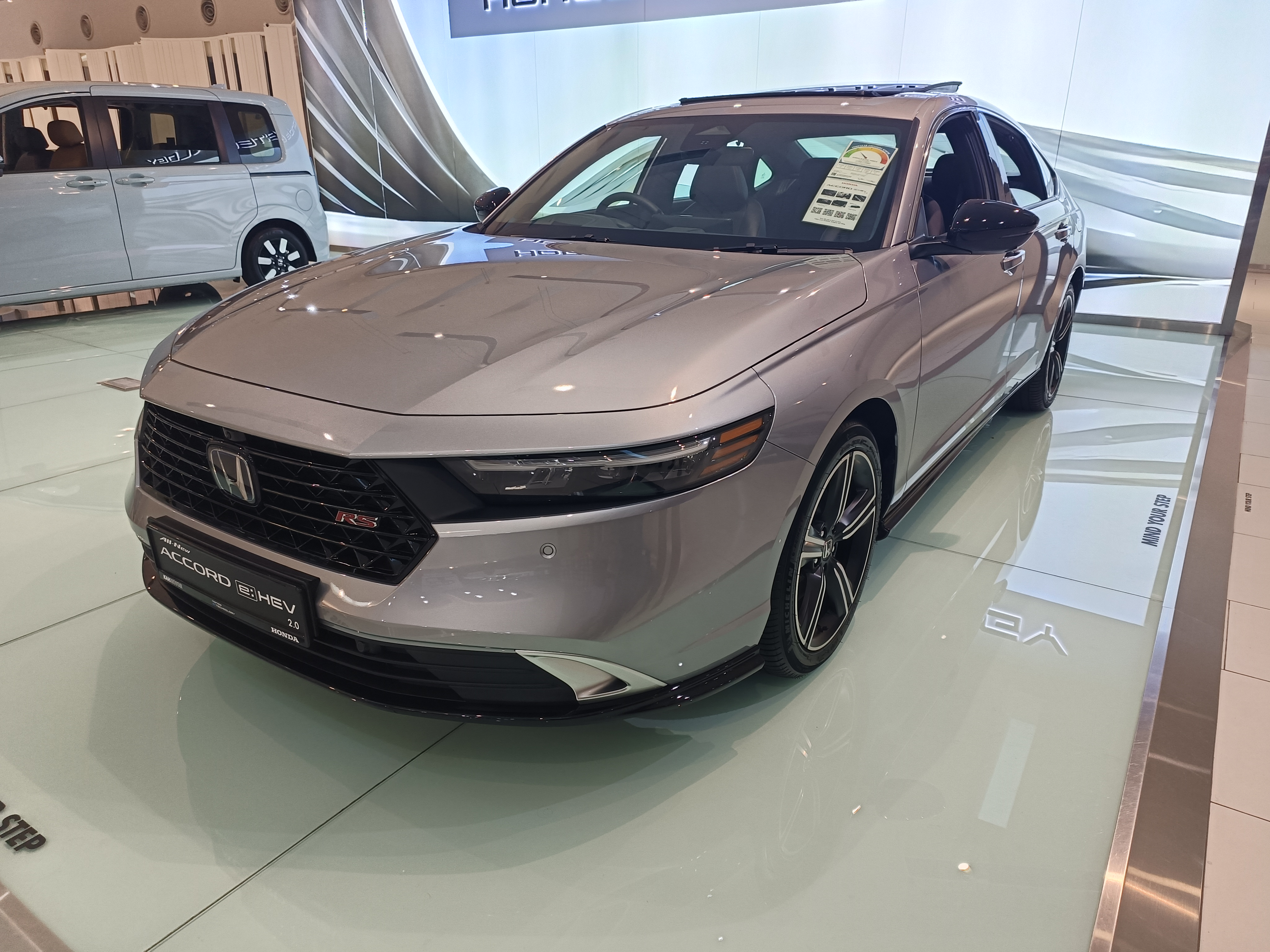
Honda Accord RS e:HEV (Singapore)

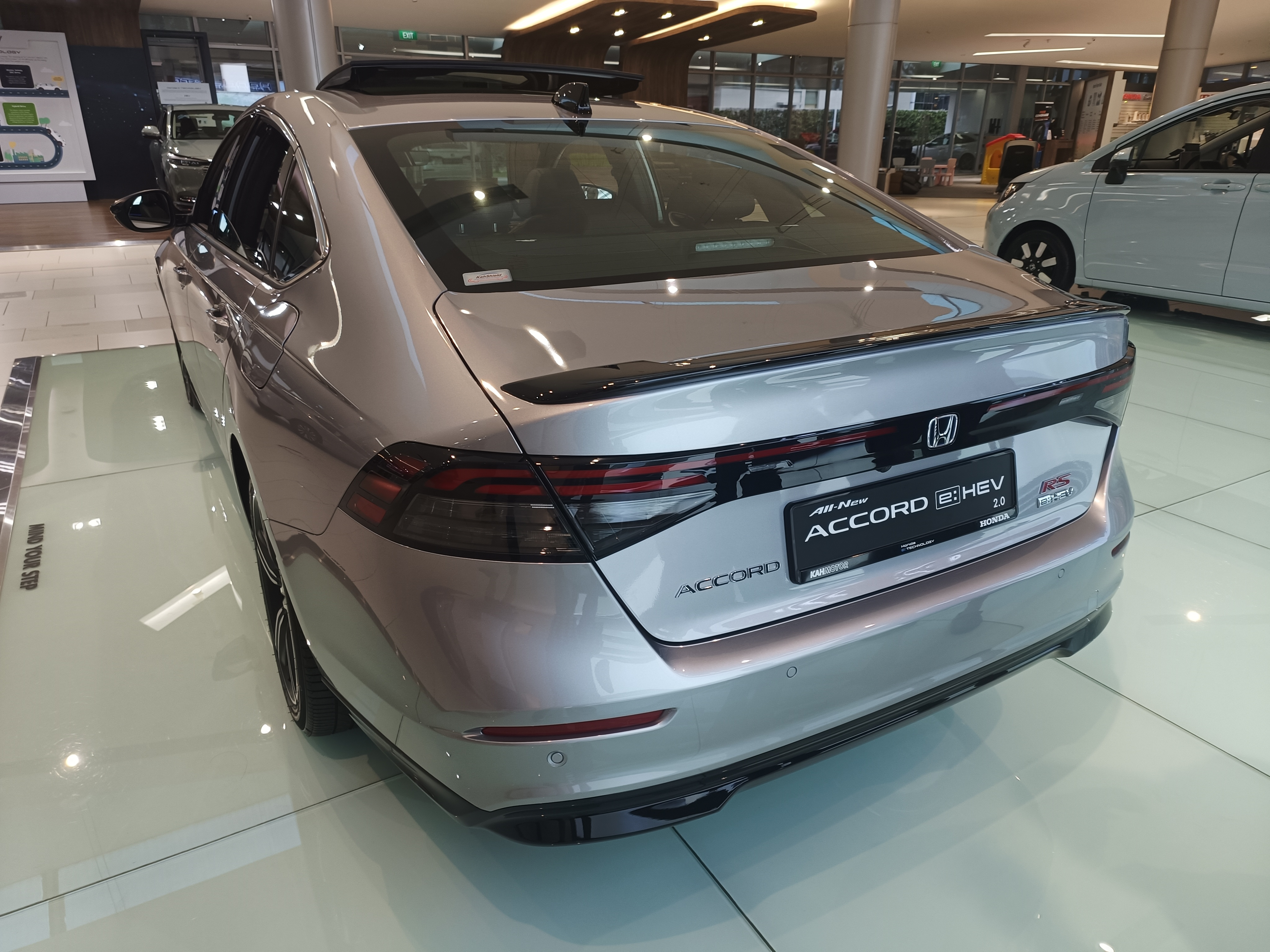
Honda Accord RS e:HEV (Singapore)

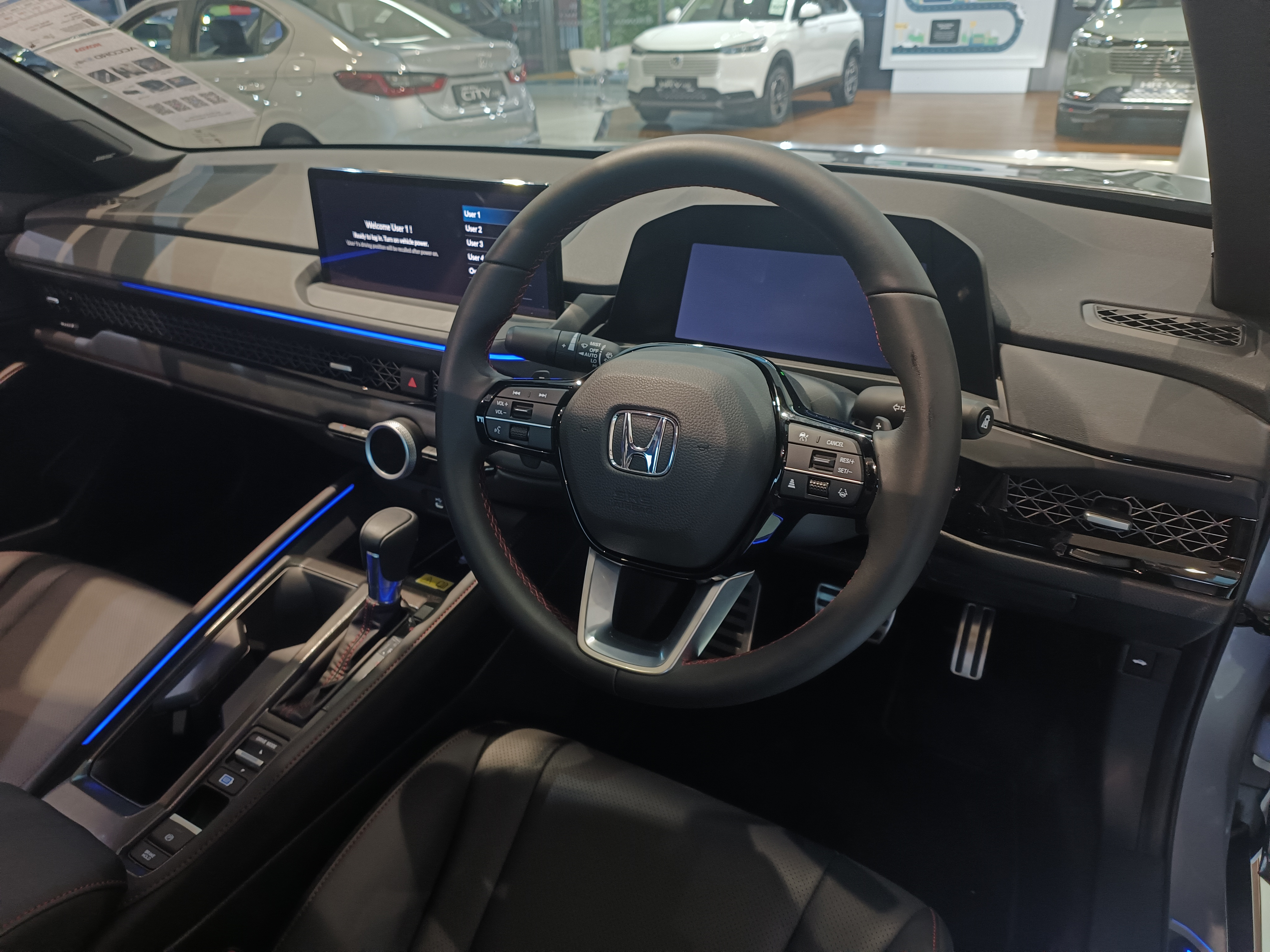
Interior (Singapore)

=== Safety ===
ASEAN NCAP test results Honda Accord e:HEV RS (2023)
Test	Points
Overall:	5 /5 stars
Adult occupant:	38.63
Child occupant:	17.75
Safety assist:	18.57
Motorcyclist Safety:	12.50

IIHS scores: 2023 Honda Accord
Small overlap front (driver)	Good
Small overlap front (passenger)	Good
Moderate overlap front	Good
Side impact	Good
Front crash prevention: vehicle-to-pedestrian (Day)	Superior
Front crash prevention: vehicle-to-pedestrian (Night)	Advanced
Headlights	Good
Seat belt reminders	Good
Child seat anchors (LATCH) ease of use	Good

== Awards ==
- Motor Trend's "Import Car of the Year" for 1994.
- Car and Driver's recipient of the 10 Best in recognition for 39 of the last 43 years. (not 1992, 1993, 1996, 1997 model years)
- Voted "Car of the Year Japan" in 1985, 1993 and 2002.
- 2008 Drive's "Car of the Year".
- South African Car of the Year 2009
- The JB car pages awarded the 2008 – 2011 Accord a best-in-class 4 1/2 Star rating.
- 2013 Canadian Car of the Year
- 2014 Green Car of the Year.
- 2018 North American Car of the Year
- 2018 Canadian Car of the Year
- Edmunds' Top Rated Sedan for 2020
- Kelley Blue Book Best Buy Mid-Size Car Award for 2021

== Motorsport ==
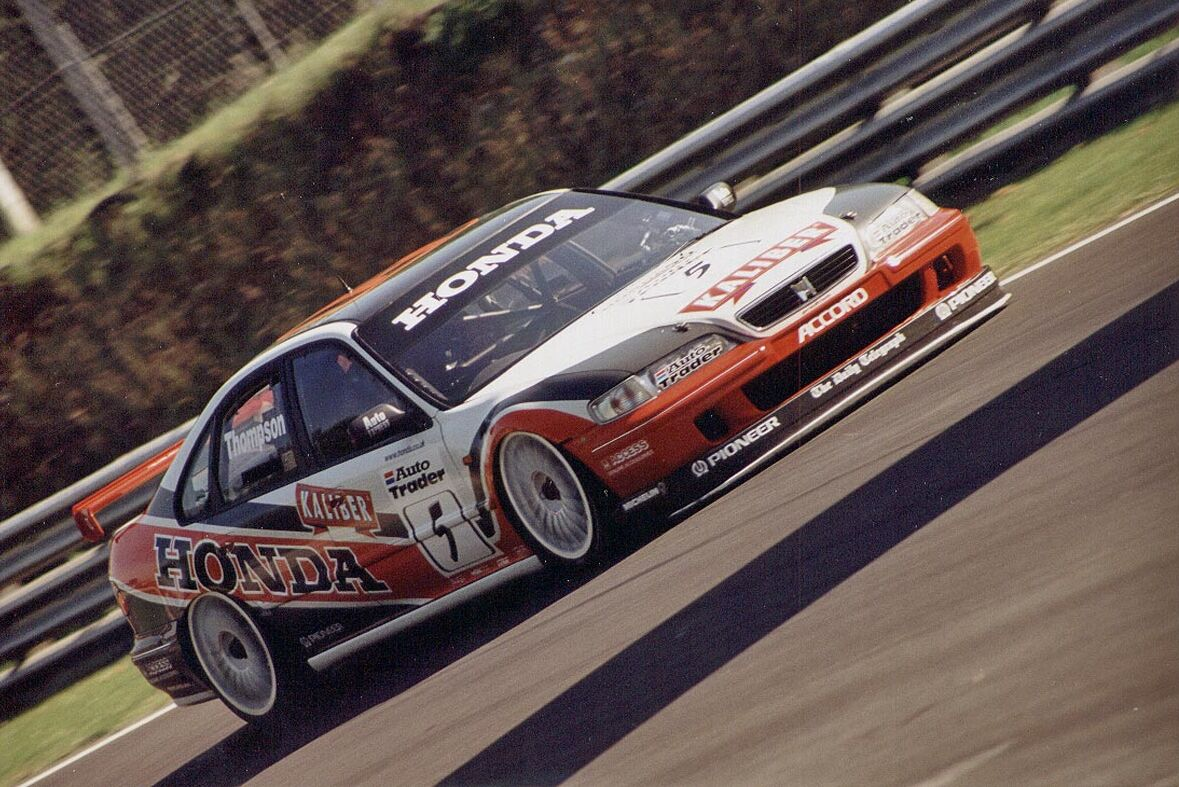
James Thompson driving the Accord during the 1998 BTCC season.

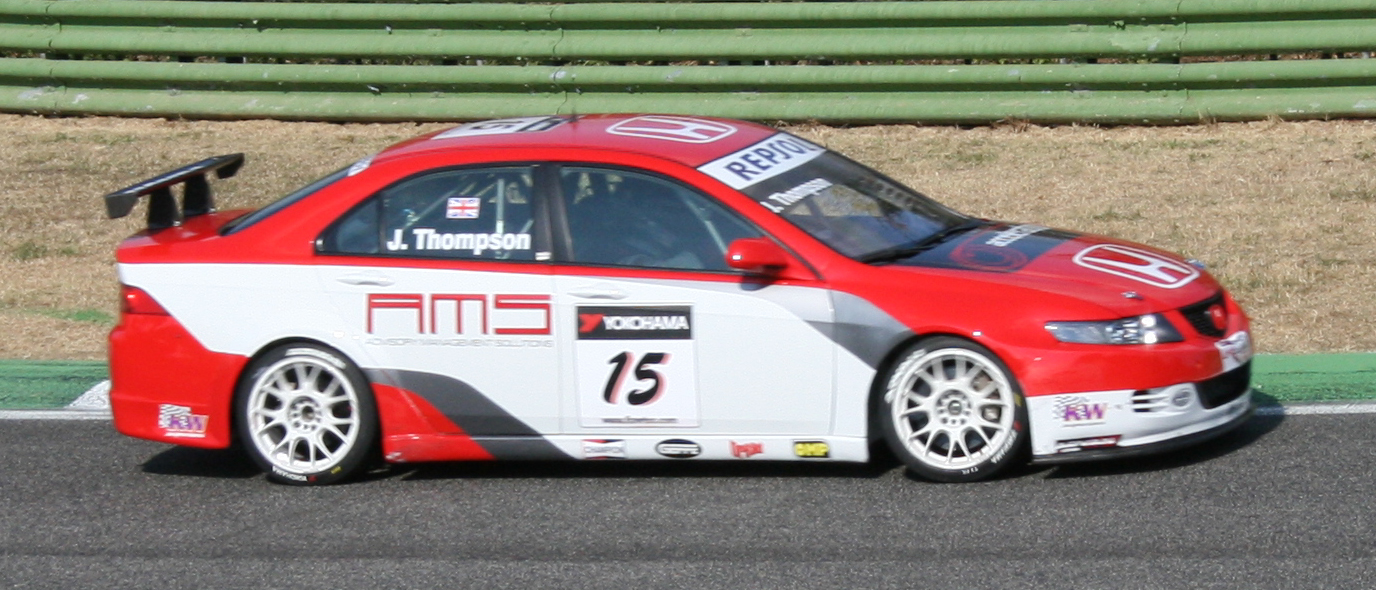
James Thompson driving the Accord Euro R at the 2008 WTCC Imola round.

The Accord has been raced in multiple different motorsport series through the years. In the British Touring Car Championship, it achieved 21 race victories, finished runner-up in the manufacturers' championship in 1999 and 2000, and also won the independents' championship in 1997. In the Japanese Touring Car Championship, the Accord won the championship in 1996 and 1997. It also won the North American Touring Car Championship in 1996 and 1997. With 15 race victories in the European Super Touring Cup/Championship, the Accord has more wins than any other car in the series. In the World Touring Car Championship, the Accord Euro R won the Race of Europe at Imola in 2008, despite being only entered by privateer teams in the series. The Accord Euro R won the European Touring Car Cup three times; in 2009, 2010 and 2011.

Year	Championship	Result
1996	Japanese Touring Car Championship	1st
1996	British Touring Car Championship	5th
1996	North American Touring Car Championship	1st
1997	Japanese Touring Car Championship	1st
1997	British Touring Car Championship	3rd
1997	North American Touring Car Championship	1st
1998	British Touring Car Championship	4th
1999	British Touring Car Championship	2nd
1999	Super Tourenwagen Cup	3rd
2000	British Touring Car Championship	2nd
2000	European Super Touring Cup	3rd
2001	European Super Touring Championship	2nd
2004	Asian Touring Car Series	1st
2006	World Touring Car Championship	3rd
2007	Russian Touring Car Championship	1st
2008	World Touring Car Championship	4th
2008	Italian Superturismo Championship	1st
2008	Swedish Touring Car Championship	2nd
2009	European Touring Car Cup	1st
2010	European Touring Car Cup	1st
2011	European Touring Car Cup	1st
2012	European Touring Car Cup	6th

== Sales ==
Calendar year	U.S.	Canada	China				Europe	Thailand	Malaysia (Note: Figures based on registration (Malaysia))	Indonesia
Calendar year	U.S.	Canada	Accord	e:PHEV	Inspire	e:PHEV	Europe	Thailand	Malaysia	Indonesia
1976	18,643				—					
1977	75,995				—					
1978	120,841				—					
1979	157,919				—					
1980	185,972				—					
1981	172,557				—					
1982	195,524				—					
1983	222,137				—					
1984	256,650				—					
1985	268,420				—					
1986	325,004				—					
1987	334,876				—					
1988	362,663				—					
1989	362,707				—					
1990	417,179				—					5,441
1991	399,297				—					3,199
1992	393,477				—					1,560
1993	330,030				—					2,850
1994	367,615				—					5,189
1995	341,384				—					2,512
1996	382,298				—					1,807
1997	384,609				—		37,632			1,714
1998	401,071		345		—		29,272			286
1999	404,192		10,008		—		46,291			478
2000	404,515		32,228		—		44,551		2,079	1,657
2001	414,718		51,131		—		27,426		1,578	1,214
2002	398,980		45,075		—		17,086		1,000	906
2003	397,750		81,032		—		30,121		1,470	1,382
2004	386,770		100,794		—		48,346		5,967	1,763
2005	369,293		113,999		—		36,118		7,016	1,339
2006	354,441		123,183		—		33,081		4,363	911
2007	392,231		64,443		—		28,491		2,812	491
2008	372,789		52,719		—		26,840		7,401	2,170
2009	290,056		175,357		—		27,708		6,100	666
2010	311,381		171,679		—		16,338		7,375	1,736
2011	235,625		160,735		—		12,307		4,534	1,234
2012	331,872	9,930	104,114		—		7,834		2,712	1,034
2013	366,678	17,165	118,920		—		4,467		4,479	1,724
2014	388,374	16,962	108,487		—		3,499		11,485	395
2015	355,557	13,112	128,126		—		1,918		7,087	511
2016	345,225	13,857	136,245		—		49		4,512	541
2017	322,655	13,504	150,365				16		4,148	300
2018	291,071	13,827	176,769				21		2,292	210
2019	267,567	11,381	223,706				4		644	358
2020	199,458	7,844	210,574				—		1,272	247
2021	202,676	6,403	201,329				—		844	169
2022	154,612	2,618	221,178				—	3,366	989	299
2023	197,947		168,488	4,197	56,909	455	—		961	420
2024	162,723		153,060	8,159	40,312	1,141	—	2,489	324	210
2025	150,196		149,547	4,304	48,552	265	—		3	N/A
